= Shinde =

- Maratha clan
- Flag of the Maratha Empire
- Ethnicity: Marathi
- Location: Maharashtra, Madhya Pradesh, Gujarat, Karnataka, Telangana and Goa
- Language: Marathi
- Religion: Hinduism

Shinde (pronunciation: [ʃin̪d̪e]) is a clan of the Maratha clan system and claim descent from the Nāgavaṃśī dynasty. variations of the name include Scindia and Sindhia, Sindia. It is found largely in Maharashtra (India), but it also appears in Indian states bordering Maharashtra like Madhya Pradesh, Gujarat, Karnataka, Goa, Telangana and Chhattisgarh.

The Scindia dynasty was founded by Ranoji Scindia, a personal guard who started as a "bodyguard" of Bajirao I Peshwa. He was the son of Jankojirao Scindia, the hereditary Patils of Kanherkhed, a village in Satara District, Maharashtra.

== Other people with this name ==
- Eknath Shinde, politician
- Gauri Shinde, film director
- Jyotiraditya Scindia, Indian politician
- Kedar Shinde, film director
- Mahadaji Shinde, Maratha statesmen
- Sushilkumar Shinde, politician
- Praniti Shinde, politician
- Ram Shinde, politician
- Ranoji Scindia, Maratha statesmen
- Sadashiv Shinde, Indian cricketer
- Sayaji Shinde, Indian actor
- Shashikant Shinde, politician
- Shilpa Shinde, TV actress
- Seema Shinde, TV actress
- Shrikant Shinde, politician
- Tarabai Shinde, Indian feminist
- Vasundhara Raje Scindia, Indian politician
- Vasant Shinde, Indian actor
