= House of Scindia =

Maratha dynasty that ruled the Gwalior State in India

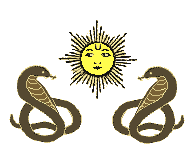
- Country: Gwalior State
- Founded: 1731
- Founder: Ranoji Scindia
- Current head: Jyotiraditya Scindia
- Final ruler: Jiwajirao Scindia (Gwalior) later the Rajpramukh)
- Titles: Maharaja of Gwalior; Raja of Gwalior; Vakil of the Mughal Empire; Hisam-us-Saltanat - Sword of The State; Amir-ul-Umara - Head of Amirs; Defender of Delhi; Rajpramukh, Governor of Madhya Bharat
- Estates: Gwalior Fort, Gwalior; Shinde Chhatri, Pune Jai Vilas Palace, Gwalior, Samudra Mahal, Mumbai, Shivsagar Estate, Mumbai; George Castle, Shivpuri, Kaliadeh Palace, Ujjain; Scindia House, New Delhi, Rani Mahal, Gwalior, Scindia Villa, New Delhi, Gwalior House, New Delhi, Padma Vilas Palace, Pune, Happy Villas, Shivpuri, Cottage Hills, Gwalior, Tekanpore Retreat, Gwalior, Madhav Vilas Palace, Shivpuri, Hiranvan Kothi, Gwalior, Cenotaphs of Scindia Dynasty, Gwalior Several other Kothis, Estates, Trusts, Ghats and Agricultural lands across North and Central India
- Deposition: 1948 (Gwalior State); 1971 (Rajpramukh under the Indian Union)

House of Scindia or earlier known as the Sendrak was a Maratha royal house that ruled the erstwhile Gwalior State in central India. They are from a small village Kanherkhed located in Satara region of Maratha Deccan. Their ancestors were Patil (sarpanch) of Kanherkhed. Members of the royal family joined the Maratha army under Chatrapati Shivaji Maharaj and his sons Sambhaji and Rajaram, serving with bravery and dedication in several battles. Later Changoji Scindia the grandfather of Ranoji Scindia married his daughter named Ambikabai Scindia II to Chatrapati Shahu I Maharaja of Satara. The Scindia dynasty rose to prominence in the 18th century and went on to dominate central and north India as one of the most prominent powers due to their influential presence in Delhi, robust tax collection system (Chauth) from neighboring rulers and their highly modernized army. During the reign of Mahadji, the Scindia dynasty reached its zenith, his territory extended right upto Lahore in the north to Ahmednagar in the south and stretching from Bharuch in the west to the border of Prayagraj in the east along with several dependent states from whom they use to collect taxes (Chauth). Ranoji Scindia was the first ruler of the dynasty who rose as a prominent military commander under Peshwa Bajirao I. Ranoji and his descendants, played a leading role during the Maratha ascendancy in northern India in the 18th century. The Gwalior State became a princely state during the British Raj in the 19th and the 20th centuries. After India's independence in 1947 and the abolition of princely states, several members of the Scindia Dynasty went on to enter Indian politics.

== Name ==
The word Scindia (also spelled Sindhia in English) is the Indo-Persian form of Sendrak. During the reign of Bahmani Sultanate the ancestors of Scindia royal house were known as Sendark. However, when they started serving Shivaji Maharaj during Maratha rule. they were known and spelled as Shinde. Later when Mahadji Scindia declared Gwalior as his capital he started referring to himself as Scindia and the British started noting the word Scindia in official documents.

== Foundation ==
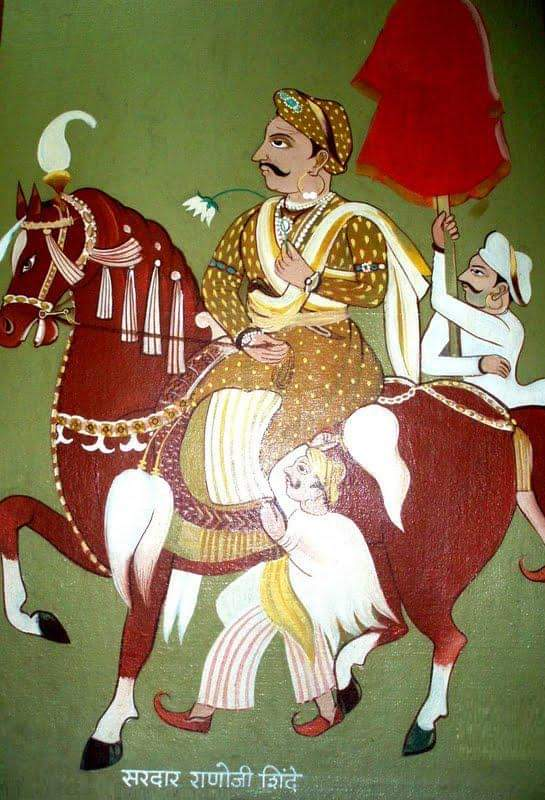
Sardar Ranoji Scindia (First Maharaja of the Scindia Dynasty)

The Scindia dynasty was founded by Ranoji Scindia, a brave general of Peshwa Bajirao I. Ranoji in his late teens was first made the personal bodyguard of Bajirao by Ramchandrababa Sukhtankar and later he rose to become commander under Bajirao forces. Ranoji prospered early under Bajirao because of the favorable circumstances created by the appointment of Bajirao as the Peshwa at the age of twenty. This had evoked jealousy from senior officials like Anant Ram Sumant, Shripatrao Pant Pratinidhi, Khanderao Dabhade and Kanhoji Bhosle. This led Bajirao to promote talented young men who were barely out of their teens such as Ranoji Scindia, the Pawar (Puar) brothers, Pilaji Jadhav, Malhar Rao Holkar, and Fateh Singh Bhosale as commanders of his troops. None of these men belonged to families that held hereditary Deshmukhi rights under earlier rulers such as the Deccan Sultanates. Earlier in 15th and 16th centuries and before joining Shivaji forces the Scindias had served as shiledars (cavalrymen) under the Bahmani Sultanate and played an important role in the state affairs. Ranoji's forefathers and his father Jankoji Rao I held hereditary post of Patil (Sarpanch) or (Head of Village) of Kanherkheda. When Mahadji Scindia declare himself as the master of Gwalior he angelized Sendrak to Scindia.

There are otherwise several anecdotes about the origin of the Scindhias, especially those recorded by Sir John Malcolm.and Stewart Gordon states that the Scindias hold vast agriculture lands and they were cultivators, Jagirdars, etc.

== Scindias versus British ==
The biggest and most humiliating defeat heaped on the British in India was by Mahadji Scindia, at Wadgaon in Maharashtra during the first Anglo-Maratha war. It has been mentioned if Mahadji had not won the battle of Wadgaon, then the British would have ruled 40 years before 1818.

Maharaja Daulatrao Scindia fought against the British in different regions of India during the Second Anglo-Maratha war. Prof R. S. Chaurasia writes "On the battle-field, he had to face Wellington, who later on defeated Napoleon, Lord Wellesley, one of the greatest English rulers of India, and administrators and diplomats like Malcolm, Close, Palmar, Tod, Munroo, Elphinstone, Matcalfe, Malet and the like, Lord Lake, a veteran who possessed wide experience of war....Daulat Rao Sindhia desired to make an anti-British coalition before the rupture with the English was complete. On 4 June 1803, Raghuji Bhonsle joined Daulat Rao and both of them appealed Jaswant (Yeshwant) Rao Holkar to join them." Lord Wellesley wrote that "the entire reduction of Sindhia’s power would certainly afford considerable security to our interest" and initiated an aggressive policy against Sindhia. Kavi Padmakar wrote in his book Aalijah Prakash that Maharaja Daulatrao Scindia will one day conquer Calcutta which was then the capital of the English East India Company.

As per Prof. Amar Farooqui throughout the 1830s and 1840s Baiza Bai’s name was linked to numerous conspiracies that had an underlying anti-British thrust. In December 1857 the British authorities at Mysore detained a person by the name of Sitaram Baba alias Mahapurush who was suspected of involvement in 1857 war of freedom. Baiza Bai Scindia according to Mahapurush, ‘was the person who first commenced this conspiracy about twenty years ago.’ Indeed Baiza Bai Scindia was hated by the British, she was expelled from her capital Gwalior by the British, even when she became old during 1857 she remained an inspiration for freedom fighters.

Although many Indian rulers accepted British dominion, Scindia's kingdom retained its independence as late as 1832. Notably, the first prince to acknowledge British rule was the long-standing adversary of the Scindias, the Nizam of Hyderabad. In a response provided by Mill to a Parliamentary Committee in Britain on 16 February 1832, regarding the status of Scindia's kingdom, it was stated that he was independent. This Committee ultimately reported to Parliament that within the Peninsula, Scindia is the only prince who preserves the semblance of independence. On 29 December 1843, British East India Company forces defeated Scindia's armies in two concurrent battles at Maharajpur and Punniar. A treaty was signed on 31 December, leading to arrangements for the occupation of Gwalior fort.

According to Mr. Parag Tope, a descendant of martyr Tatya Tope, in his book Operation Red Lotus, Jayajirao Scindia provided full support to Tatya Tope, who served as a crucial link between the Gwalior Durbar and the freedom fighters in Kanpur and Jhansi. Jayajirao commanded his army to join Tatya and the freedom fighters upon their arrival in Gwalior. In this manner, Jayajirao offered significant covert support to the freedom fighters, even after suffering defeat against the British at Maharajpur and Punniar. By maintaining this support in secrecy, Scindia ensured that if the war of independence were to fail, the wrath of the British would not be directed at the common people of Gwalior. This approach reflected an age-old Maratha strategy of "Gupt-Yuddh" against the enemy when one is weak (Scindia engaged in battle and lost against the British at Maharajpur and Punniar, refusing to surrender without a fight, unlike many other rulers).

== History ==
=== Maratha Period ===
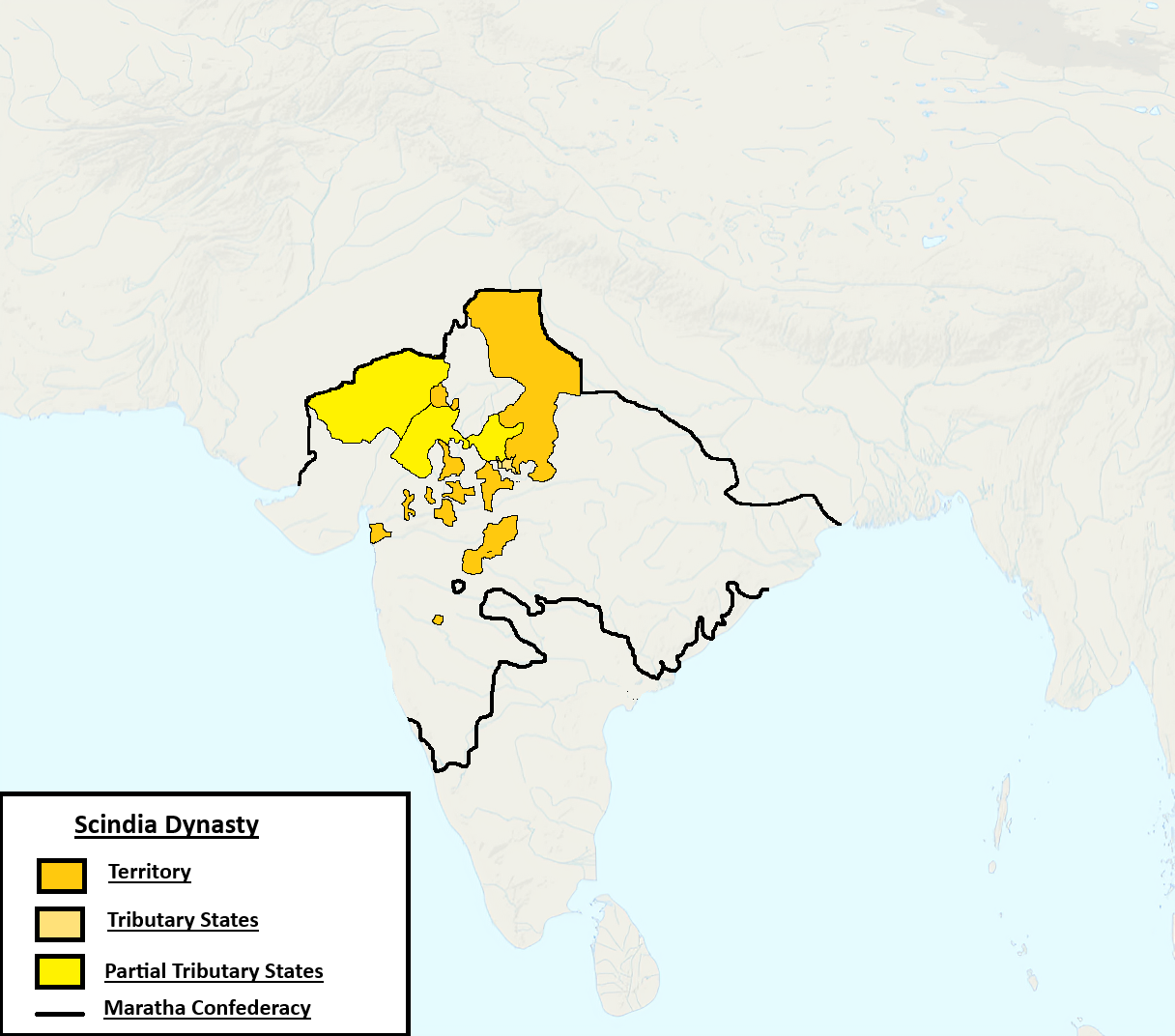
Territories of the Gwalior in 1795

The Scindia dynasty was founded by Ranoji Scindia, who was the son of Jankojirao Scindia, the Patil of Kanherkhed, a village in Satara District, Maharashtra. Peshwa Baji Rao's career saw the strengthening of the Maratha Empire. Ranoji was in charge of the Maratha conquests in Malwa in 1726. Ranoji established his capital at Ujjain in 1731. His successors included Jayajirao, Jyotibarao, Dattajirao, Jankojirao, Mahadji Shinde and Daulatrao Scindia.The Scindias became a major regional power in the latter half of the 18th century, and figured prominently in the three Anglo-Maratha Wars.They held sway over many of the Rajput states, and conquered north India. In 1818, after accepting the terms of a subsidiary alliance with the British, the family shifted their base from Ujjain to Gwalior.

=== Rulers of Gwalior state under the British ===
After the defeat of the allied Maratha states by the British in the Third Anglo-Maratha War of 1818, Daulatrao Shinde was forced to accept local autonomy as a princely state within British-occupied India and to give up Ajmer to the British. After the death of Daulatrao, Maharani Baiza Bai ruled the empire, saving it from the British power, till the adopted child Jankoji Rao took over the charge. Jankoji died in 1843, and his widow Tarabai Raje Scindia successfully maintained the position and adopted a child from close lineage named Jayajirao.

=== Accession of Gwalior state into Independent India ===
The Scindia dynasty ruled Gwalior until India's independence from the United Kingdom in 1947, when the Maharaja Jivajirao Scindia acceded to the Government of India. Gwalior was merged with a number of other princely states to become the new Indian state of Madhya Bharat. Jiwajirao Scindia served as the state's rajpramukh, or appointed governor, from 28 May 1948 to 31 October 1956, when Madhya Bharat was merged into Madhya Pradesh.

=== Political careers of family members ===
In 1962, Vijayraje Scindia, the widow of Maharaja Jiwajirao, was elected to the Lok Sabha, beginning the family's career in electoral politics. She was first a member of the Congress Party, and later became an influential member of the Bharatiya Janata Party. Her son Madhavrao Scindia was elected to the Lok Sabha in 1971 representing the Jansangh Party, he joined Congress in 1980 and served until his death in 2001. His son, Jyotiraditya Scindia, joined the Congress Party and was elected to the seat formerly held by his father in 2004. He later joined the Bharatiya Janata Party on 11 March 2020. Vijayaraje's daughters have supported the Bharatiya Janata Party. Vasundhara Raje Scindia contested and won five parliamentary elections from Madhya Pradesh and Rajasthan. Under the Vajpayee government from 1998 onwards, Vasundhara was in charge of several different ministries. In 2003 she led the Bharatiya Janata Party to its largest majority in Rajasthan, and became the state's Chief Minister. In 2013 again, she led Bharatiya Janata Party to a thumping win in the state of Rajasthan, winning over 160 out of the 200 seats in the assembly elections. Her other daughter, Yashodhara Raje Scindia, contested assembly elections from Shivpuri in Madhya Pradesh and won in 1998, 2003 and 2013 and also lok sabha 2004, 2009 from Gwalior. Upon the BJP's win in the state, she became the state's Minister for Tourism, Sports and Youth Affairs. Vasundhara's son Dushyant Singh entered the Lok Sabha in 2004 from Rajasthan.

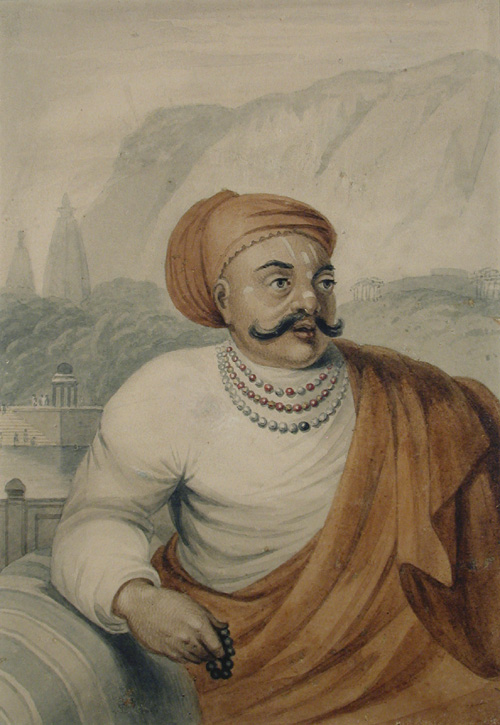
Mahadaji Scindia was instrumental in resurrecting Maratha power in North India after the Battle of Panipat in 1761

== Scindia Maharajas of Gwalior and Ujjain ==
The heads of the Royal House of Scindia include:

- Ranoji Rao Shinde (1731 – 19 July 1745). Died 19 July 1745.
- Jayappa Rao Shinde (1745 – 25 July 1755). Born c. 1720, died 25 July 1755.
- Jankoji Rao Scindia I (25 July 1755 – 15 January 1761). Born in 1745. died 15 January 1761.
- Dattaji Rao Scindia (Regent 1755 – 10 January 1760). Died 10 January 1760.
- Vacant 15 January 1761 – 25 November 1763
- Kadarji Rao Scindia (25 November 1763 – 10 July 1764) Died ?.
- Manaji Rao Scindia (10 July 1764 – 18 January 1768) Died ?.
- Mahadaji Scindia (18 January 1768 – 12 February 1794). Born 3 December 1730, died 12 February 1794.
- Daulat Rao Shinde (12 February 1794 – 21 March 1827). Born 1779, died 21 March 1827.
- Jankoji Rao Scindia II (18 June 1827 – 7 February 1843). Born 1805, died 7 February 1843.
- Jayaji Rao Scindia (7 February 1843 – 20 June 1886). Born 19 January 1835, died 20 June 1886.
- Madho Rao Scindia (20 June 1886 – 5 June 1925). Born 20 October 1876, died 5 June 1925.
- Jivajirao Scindia (Maharaja 5 June 1925 – 15 August 1947, Rajpramukh 28 May 1948 – 31 October 1956. Last Maharaja, later Rajpramukh) Born 26 June 1916, died 16 July 1961.
- Madhavrao Scindia (1961–2001), the last reigning Maharaja, before the abolishment of the monarchy in 1971.

=== Article 18(1) of the Indian Constitution abolishes all titles. However, military and academic distinctions are exceptions to this prohibition. ===
- Jyotiraditya Scindia (2001–present)
- Mahaaryaman Scindia (heir apparent)

== Orders of chivalry ==
The Royal House of Scindia awards two orders of chivalry; these knighthoods were instituted by Maharaja Madho Rao Scindia in 1900 and 1907, respectively, and include:

- Mansab-i-Aswadi (Order of the Snake), awarded in three grades
- Gwalior Medal, awarded in three grades

== Family tree ==
Scindia dynasty and the Family tree of the Maharajas of Gwalior
Biological Child
Adopted Child

Ranoji Rao^{(1)} r. 1731-1745
Jayappaji; Rao^{(2)} r. 1745-1755	Dattaji Rao; Regent t. 1755-1761	Tukoji Rao	Mahadaji^{(7)} r. 1768-1794
Jankoji; Rao I^{(3)} r. 1755-1761	Kadarji Rao^{(4)} r. 1763-1764	Anand Rao	Manaji Rao^{(6)} r. 1764-1768
Baiza Bai; Regent t. 1827-1833	Daulat Rao^{(8)} r. 1794-1827
Jankoji; Rao II^{(9)} r. 1827-1843	Tara Bai; Regent t. 1843-1844
Sakhya Bai; Regent t. 1886-1894	Jayaji Rao^{(10)} r. 1843-1886
Madho Rao^{(11)} r. 1886-1925	Gajra Bai; Regent t. 1931-1936
Jivaji Rao^{(12)} r. 1925-1948 – Titular – r. 1948-1961
Madhav; Rao^{(13)} – Titular – r. 1961-1971; Head of the Family; 1971-2001
Jyotiraditya^{(14)} Head of the Family; 2001-present
