= Dattaji Rao Scindia =

Maratha general (1723–1760)

Sardar Dattaji Shinde (Scindia) Scindia
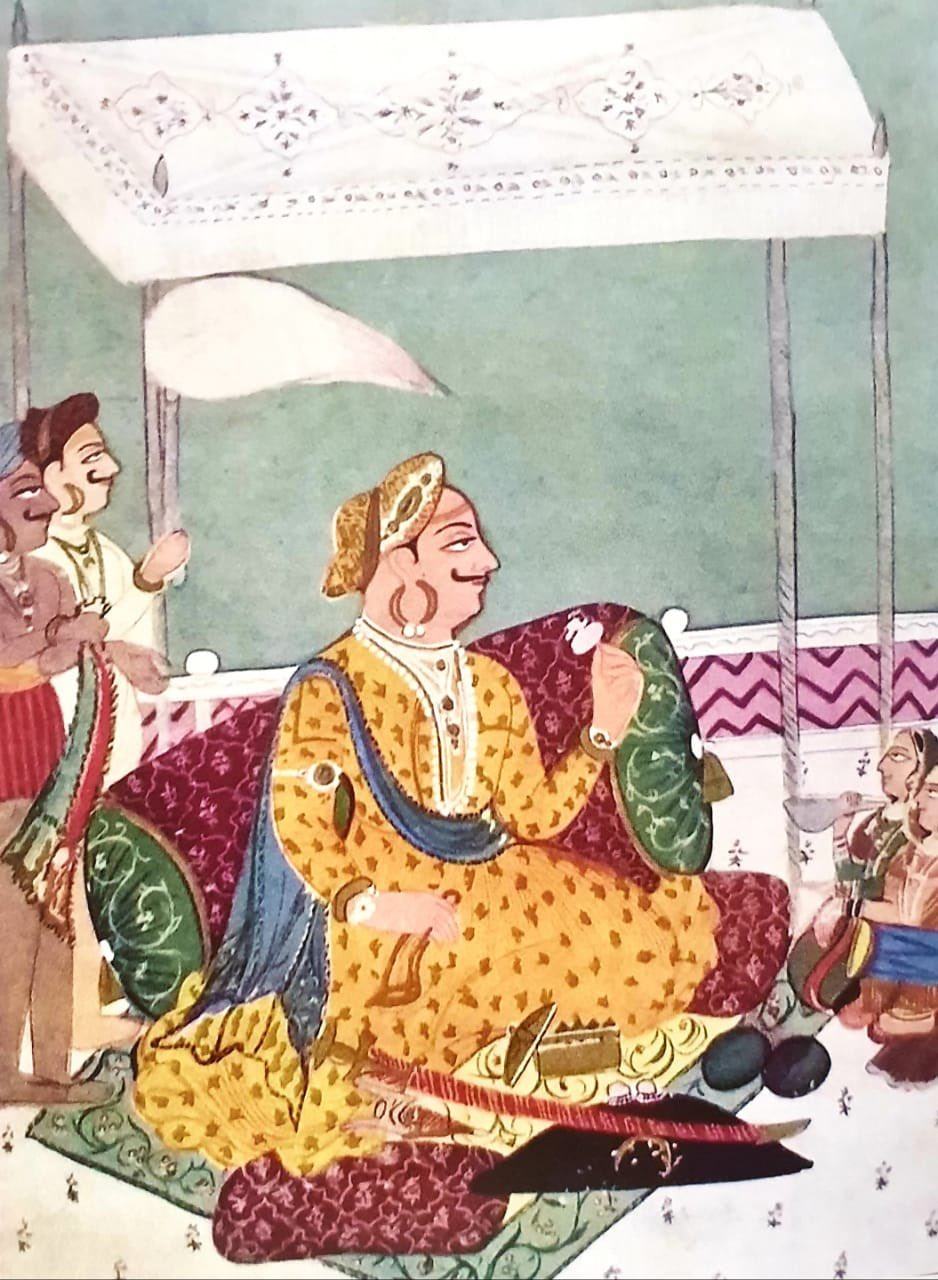
- Dattaji Shinde (Scindia)
- Born: c. 1723
- Died: 10 January 1760 (aged 36–37)
- Relatives: Ranoji Shinde (father); Jayappaji Rao Scindia (brother); Jankoji Rao Scindia (nephew); Jyotiba Rao Scindia (brother); Tukoji Rao Scindia (halfbrother); Mahadji Shinde (halfbrother)
- Military career
- Allegiance: Maratha Empire
- Conflicts: Battle of Delhi (1757); Battle of Merta (1755); Battle of Sindhkhed (1757); Maratha-Nizam War (1751–52); Northern Conquest of Raghunath Rao; Battle of Taraori (1759); Battle of Barari Ghat †

Dattaji Rao Shinde, also known as Dattaji Rao Scindia, (c. 1723 – 10 January 1760) was the second son of Ranoji Rao Shinde and Maina Bai, alias Nimba Bai. His elder brother was Jayappaji Rao Shinde and his younger brother was Jyotiba.

== Early life ==
Dattajirao was the elder half-brother of Mahadaji Shinde, who later became the confederacy head of Gwalior princely state, famous fabricator of the Great Maratha Resurrection of 1771, and also the regent for his nephew Jankoji Rao Shinde, from 1755 until Jankoji's death in 1761.

== Battle with Afghans and death ==
Balaji Baji Rao, also called Nanasaheb Peshwa, gave Dattaji Rao command of the subjugated Lahore and Multan provinces, with an army of 18,000 cavalry to stop the Afghan invasion led by Ahmed Shah Durrani, also called Ahmad Shah Abdali. The Marathas had captured the forts of Attock and Peshawar in 1757–1758, and wanted to expand their rule up to Kabul, Kandahar and the Afghanistan-Iran border. After many centuries since 1020, when Mahmud of Ghazni, head of the Ghaznavids, had defeated the Hindu ruler Trilochanpala and Hindushahi of ancient Gandhar and Punjab regions, Hindu rule had returned to the entire Indus River region.

After the fiercest battles in Lahore and Multan area, the victorious Raghunath Rao, returned to Delhi and then to Pune without appointing the range commanders, for the Lahore and Multan regions. He wasn't much interested to settle down and rule in this region permanently, away from the luxuries of Pune, their own seat and throne area. Eventually, this proved as a historical mistake of the Grand Maratha Confederation Army's top leadership.

In March 1759, Dattaji Rao Shinde, reached Machhiwara with a massive army, of approximate 40,000 cavalry men, but just like Raghunath Rao, Dattajirao also did not want to settle down in Punjab on permanent basis, as he was fully determined to root out the main enemy of the Maratha empire then, i.e. Najib ad-Dawlah Rohilla. He wrote an intimation letter to the Nanasaheb Peshwa in Pune, and deployed Sabajirao Shinde to take over the Maratha garrisons of Punjab with the assistance of Bapu Rao and Dadu Rao Shinde. Dattajirao himself went to fight with Najib Khan Rohilla, in the Doab, popularly known as the Antarvedi area. But due to the absence of Sabajirao Shinde in Rohtas Fort, the Afghans under General Jahan Khan attacked and captured both Attock and Rohtas Fort and won those back again from the Marathas. Sabajirao Shinde and local Sikhs rallied and defeated Afghans in Battle of Lahore, (1759). Afghan General Jahan Khan lost his only son in this battle and once again, Afghans retreated to Kabul. This victory of Marathas at Lahore, made Ahmad Shah Abdali more aggressive and hugely upset. Then Afghans and Rohilla allied and sent Jahan Khan with the massive army of 60,000 cavalry. Jahan Khan captured Attock and Peshawar again by defeating the Maratha garrisons decisively. General Jahan Khan then defeated Triyambak Rao's platoon size army of 6,000 men stationed at Dera Ghazi Khan and Abdali moved towards south Punjab immediately. They captured Lahore, capital of Punjab.

Ahmad Shah Abdali attacked Dattaji's party of 2,500 men, outside Delhi, before the main battle. After this skirmish, Abdali regrouped with Najib ad-Dawlah, and Dattajirao retreated in to the Delhi fort, for rearranging the Maratha garrison for the main battle. Ahmad Shah Abdali then allied with the 60,000 army of Najib-ud-Daula, and together with approximately 1,20,000 men, (Note: this number is 120,000 [1 lakh and 20 thousand men]) they attacked on Dattajirao at final time. On 10 January 1760, in the Battle of Buradi Ghat, also known as the Burrari, or Barari Ghat, on the banks of river Yamuna, near Delhi, Dattaji's outnumbered army was totally defeated and then he was beheaded, by the Mian Qutub Shah and Najib ad-Dawlah Rohilla.

Today also, Dattaji is remembered in the popular Maratha history for his last words when Qutub Shah & Najib said, "Kyu Patil, aur ladenge" and Dattaji Shinde replied, "kyu nahi.. bachenge to aur bhi ladenge", which he said to the Mian Qutub Shah & Najib ad-Dawlah while dying.

== In popular culture ==
- In the 1994 Hindi TV series The Great Maratha, Dattaji's character was portrayed by Mangal Dhillon.
- In the 2019 Bollywood film Panipat, Dattaji Rao Scindia was portrayed by Milind Gunaji.

== See also ==
- Scindia
