= Jiwajirao Scindia =

Maharaja of Gwalior from 1925 to 1948

Sir George Jiwajirao Scindia
- Maharaja Scindia of Gwalior
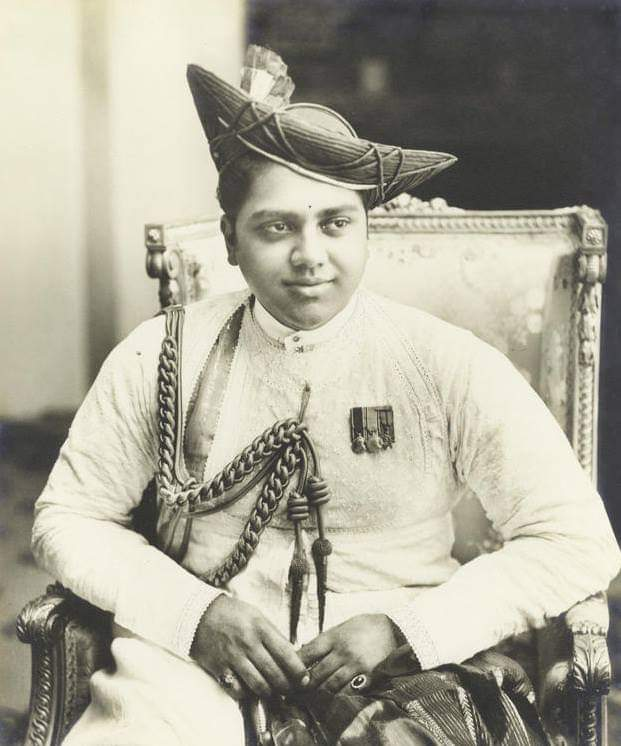
- 7th and the last ruling Maharaja Scindia of Gwalior, c. 1940

7th Maharaja of Gwalior
- Reign: 5 June 1925 – 28 May 1948

Recipient privy purse, benefits, and title "Maharaja of Gwalior"
- Reign: 28 May 1948 – 16 July 1961
- Successor: Madhavrao Scindia
- Born: 26 June 1916; Gwalior, Gwalior State, British India
- Died: 16 July 1961 (aged 45); Samudra Mahal, Bombay, Maharashtra, India
- Spouse: Vijaya Raje Scindia
- Issue: Padma Raje; Usha Raje; Madhavrao Scindia; Vasundhara Raje Scindia; Yashodhara Raje Scindia
- House: Scindia
- Father: Madho Rao Scindia I
- Mother: Gajrabai Raje Sahib Scindia
- Religion: Hindu

Rajpramukh of Madhya Bharat
- In office 28 May 1948 – 1 November 1956
- Preceded by: Madho Rao Scindia I
- Succeeded by: position abolished Bhogaraju Pattabhi Sitaramayya (as Governor of Madhya Pradesh)

Sir George Jiwajirao Scindia KStJ (26 June 1916 – 16 July 1961) was the monarch of the Gwalior state during the British Raj and later the Rajpramukh (Governor) of the Indian state of Madhya Bharat. Jiwajirao was the Maharaja, of the princely state of Gwalior in central India from 1925 until 1947. After the state was absorbed into independent India, he was granted a privy purse, certain privileges, and the use of the title Maharaja of Gwalior by the Government of India, which he retained until his death in 1961. He also served as the rajpramukh (governor) of the state of Madhya Bharat until 1956. The monarch also famously teamed up with Late Shri Gangaram Govind “Babasaheb” Gawde to start The Maratha Mandir Cinema and the larger Maratha Mandir Trust, which has grown to a very prominent charitable trust in the state of Maharashtra and South Bombay.

== Early life ==
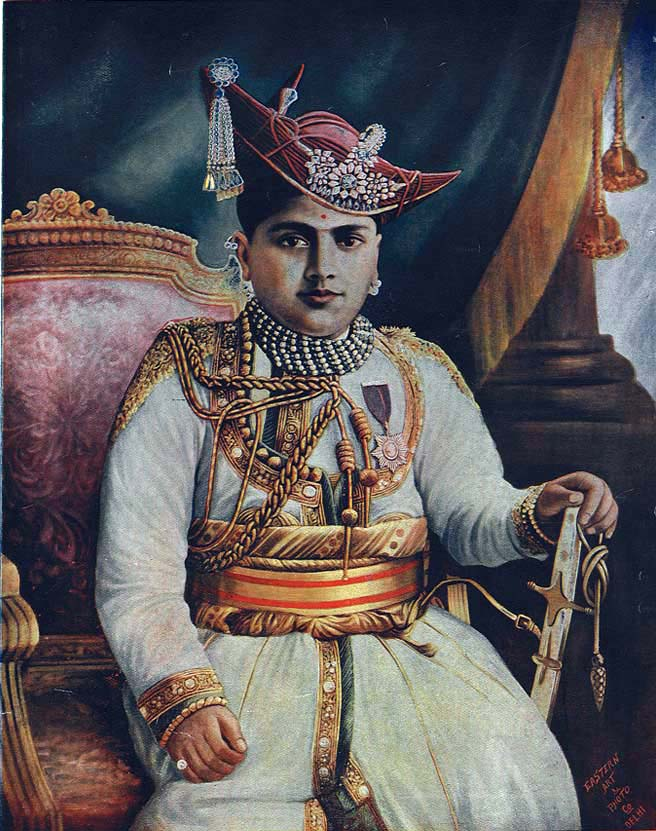
Jiwajirao Scindia as a child; Hand-coloured photograph, c. 1930

Jiwajirao was a scion of the Scindia family, descended from the Maratha general Ranojirao Scindia. Ranojirao was the head of the Maratha armies in Malwa during the first part of the 18th century, as the Maratha Empire was expanding rapidly at the expense of the Mughal Empire. Daulatrao Scindia shifted the capital from Ujjain to the new city of Lashkar, near the historic fortress-city of Gwalior. The Scindias signed the peace treaty of Salbai with British in 1818 at the conclusion of their benefits from them after they lost the 3rd War Third Anglo-Maratha War. At 68,291 km^{2}, Gwalior was the largest state in the Central India Agency, and among the five largest princely states in all of India.

== Personal life ==
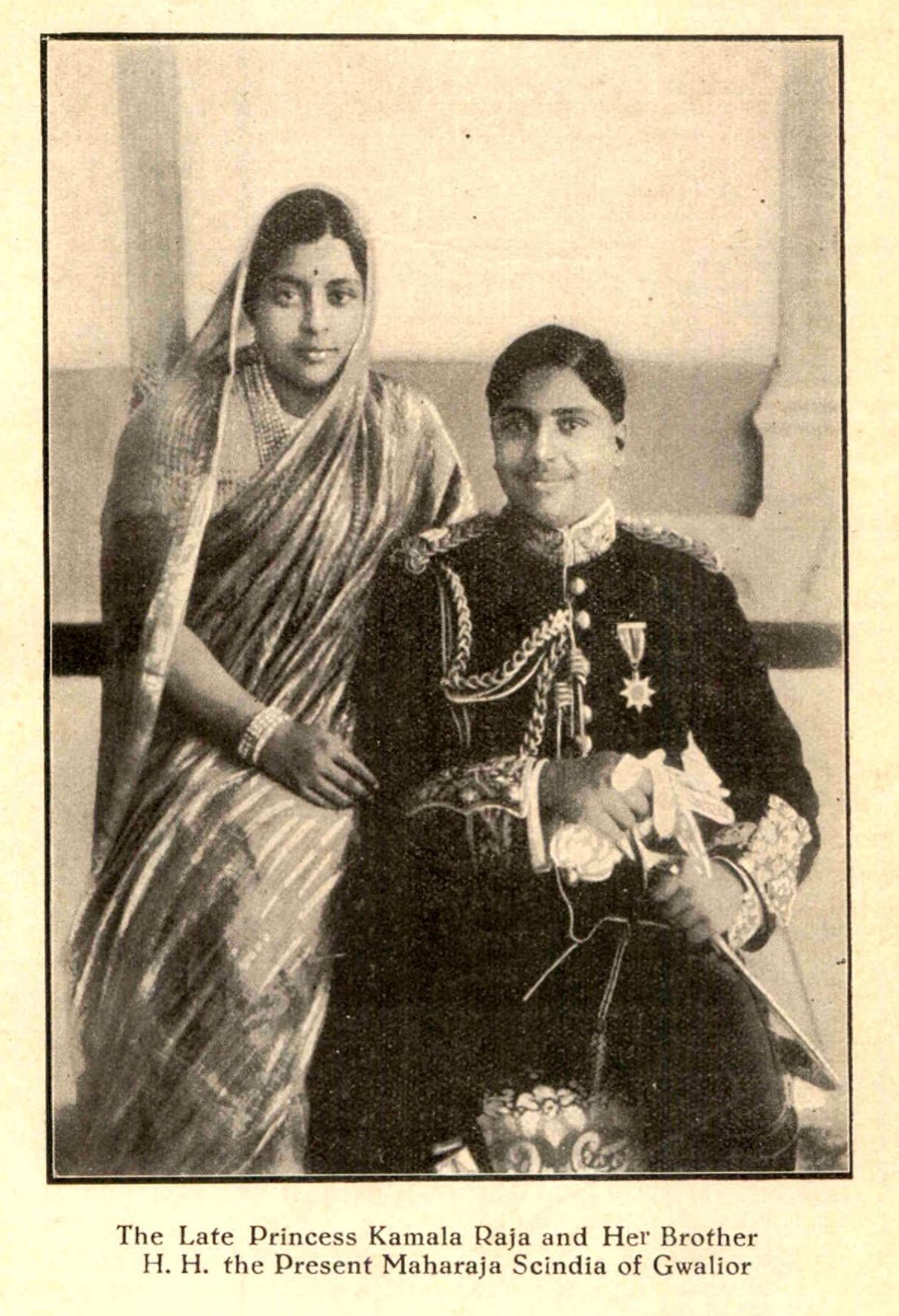
Scindia with his sister Kamala Raja Scindia

Jiwajirao became Maharaja on 5 June 1925, succeeding his father Madho Rao Scindia upon his death. He also had a sister, Kamala Raja Scindia. On 21 February 1941, he married Lekha Divyeshwari Devi, afterwards known as Vijaya Raje Scindia, who was descended from the powerful Rana dynasty of Nepal. They were the parents of five children, four daughters and a son, including:

- Padma Raje, was married to HH Maharaja Kirit Bikram Manikya Debbarman of Tripura. Died in Calcutta, circa 1965.
- Usha Raje, is married to Nepalese Minister Pashupati Shamsher Jang Bahadur Rana of the Rana Dynasty, who is the grandson of Shree Teen Maharaja Mohan Shamsher Jang Bahadur Rana.
- Madhav Rao (10 March 1945 – 30 September 2001), the former union cabinet minister in India, Member of Parliament and King of Gwalior.
- Vasundhara Raje, Former chief minister of the Indian state of Rajasthan. and former union Minister of Small Scale Industries and Agro and Rural Industries,
- Yashodhara Raje, Bharatiya Janata Party (BJP) leader and MLA of the Indian state of Madhya Pradesh.

== Career ==
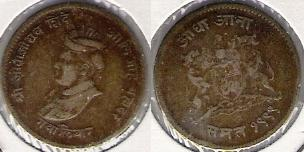
Jivajirao on a 1942 half anna coin.

Jiwajirao ruled Gwalior state as an absolute monarch and a British vassal until shortly after India's independence on 15 August 1947. The rulers of Indian princely states were required to accede to either of the two dominions (India and Pakistan) created by the India Independence Act 1947. Jivajirao signed a covenant with the rulers of the adjoining princely states that united their several states to form a new state within the Union of India known as Madhya Bharat. This new covenanted state was to be governed by a council headed by a ruler to be known as the Rajpramukh. Madhya Bharat signed a fresh Instrument of Accession with the Government of India effective 15 June 1948. Jivajirao Scindia became the first rajpramukh, or appointed governor, of the state on 28 May 1948. He served as Rajpramukh until 31 October 1956, when the state was merged into Madhya Pradesh.

== Family ==
After his death in 1961, Jiwajirao's family remained involved in politics. In 1962, his widow, Rajmata Vijayraje Scindia, was elected to the Lok Sabha, beginning the family's career in electoral politics. She was initially a member of the Indian National Congress party, parted ways in 1967, joined the Jana Sangh, and later became an influential member of the Bharatiya Janata Party. Their son, Madhavrao Scindia, was elected to the Lok Sabha in 1971, representing the Jana Sangh. He later joined the Congress in 1980 served until his death in 2001. Madhavrao's son, Jyotiraditya Scindia, was also a member of the Congress Party, was elected in 2002 to the seat formerly held by his father. On 10-March-2020 Jyotiraditya Scindia quit Indian National Congress and was elected to the Rajya Sabha in June 2020 as BJP member. Jivajirao's daughter Vasundhara Raje is an eminent politician associated with the Bharatiya Janata Party. She was the first woman Chief Minister of Rajasthan and also was a member of the Lok Sabha for five consecutive terms since 1989. Vasundhara Raje's son, Dushyant Singh of Dholpur is a BJP MP. His youngest daughter, Yashodhara Raje has served as a State Minister in the Madhya Pradesh government.

== Full name and titles ==
Jivajirao was also known with his full name: Lieutenant-General His Highness Ali Jah, Umdat ul-Umara, Hisam us-Sultanat, Mukhtar ul-Mulk, Azim ul-Iqtidar, Rafi-us-Shan Wala Shikoh, Muhtasham-i-Dauran, Maharajadhiraj Maharaja Shrimant Jivaji Rao Scindia Bahadur, Shrinath, Mansur-i-Zaman, Fidvi-i-Hazrat-i-Malika-i-Mua'zzama-i-Rafi-ud-Darja-i-Inglistan, Maharaja Scindia of Gwalior, GCSI, GCIE.

During his life he acquired several titles and honorific names:

- 1916 – 1925: Yuvaraja Maharaj Shrimant Jivaji Rao Scindia Bahadur
- 1925 – 1937: His Highness Ali Jah, Umdat ul-Umara, Hisam us-Sultanat, Mukhtar ul-Mulk, Azim ul-Iqtidar, Rafi-us-Shan Wala Shikoh, Muhtasham-i-Dauran, Maharajadhiraj Maharaja Shrimant Jivaji Rao Scindia Bahadur, Shrinath, Mansur-i-Zaman, Fidvi-i-Hazrat-i-Malika-i-Mua'zzama-i-Rafi-ud-Darja-i-Inglistan, Maharaja Scindia of Gwalior
- 1937 – 1941: His Highness Ali Jah, Umdat ul-Umara, Hisam us-Sultanat, Mukhtar ul-Mulk, Azim ul-Iqtidar, Rafi-us-Shan Wala Shikoh, Muhtasham-i-Dauran, Maharajadhiraj Maharaja Shrimant Jivaji Rao Scindia Bahadur, Shrinath, Mansur-i-Zaman, Fidvi-i-Hazrat-i-Malika-i-Mua'zzama-i-Rafi-ud-Darja-i-Inglistan, Maharaja Scindia of Gwalior, KStJ
- 1941 – 1943: Captain His Highness Ali Jah, Umdat ul-Umara, Hisam us-Sultanat, Mukhtar ul-Mulk, Azim ul-Iqtidar, Rafi-us-Shan Wala Shikoh, Muhtasham-i-Dauran, Maharajadhiraj Maharaja Shrimant Sir Jivaji Rao Scindia Bahadur, Shrinath, Mansur-i-Zaman, Fidvi-i-Hazrat-i-Malika-i-Mua'zzama-i-Rafi-ud-Darja-i-Inglistan, Maharaja Scindia of Gwalior, GCIE, KStJ
- 1943 – 1945: Major His Highness Ali Jah, Umdat ul-Umara, Hisam us-Sultanat, Mukhtar ul-Mulk, Azim ul-Iqtidar, Rafi-us-Shan Wala Shikoh, Muhtasham-i-Dauran, Maharajadhiraj Maharaja Shrimant Sir Jivaji Rao Scindia Bahadur, Shrinath, Mansur-i-Zaman, Fidvi-i-Hazrat-i-Malika-i-Mua'zzama-i-Rafi-ud-Darja-i-Inglistan, Maharaja Scindia of Gwalior, GCIE, KStJ
- 1945 – 1946: Major-General His Highness Ali Jah, Umdat ul-Umara, Hisam us-Sultanat, Mukhtar ul-Mulk, Azim ul-Iqtidar, Rafi-us-Shan Wala Shikoh, Muhtasham-i-Dauran, Maharajadhiraj Maharaja Shrimant Sir Jivaji Rao Scindia Bahadur, Shrinath, Mansur-i-Zaman, Fidvi-i-Hazrat-i-Malika-i-Mua'zzama-i-Rafi-ud-Darja-i-Inglistan, Maharaja Scindia of Gwalior, GCIE, KStJ
- 1946 – 1961: Lieutenant-General His Highness Ali Jah, Umdat ul-Umara, Hisam us-Sultanat, Mukhtar ul-Mulk, Azim ul-Iqtidar, Rafi-us-Shan Wala Shikoh, Muhtasham-i-Dauran, Maharajadhiraj Maharaja Shrimant Sir Jivaji Rao Scindia Bahadur, Shrinath, Mansur-i-Zaman, Fidvi-i-Hazrat-i-Malika-i-Mua'zzama-i-Rafi-ud-Darja-i-Inglistan, Maharaja Scindia of Gwalior, GCSI, GCIE, KStJ

== Honours ==
(ribbon bar, as it would look today)

- King George V Silver Jubilee Medal, 1935
- King George VI Coronation Medal, 1937
- Knight of the Order of St John (KStJ), 1937
- Knight Grand Commander of the Order of the Indian Empire (GCIE), 1941
- 1939-1945 Star, 1945
- British War Medal, 1945
- India Service Medal, 1945
- Knight Grand Commander of the Order of the Star of India (GCSI), 1946
- Indian Independence Medal, 1947
- Queen Elizabeth II Coronation Medal, 1953

Jiwajirao Scindia Scindia Dynasty Born: 26 June 1916 Died: 16 July 1961
Regnal titles
Preceded by Madhavrao II	Maharaja of Gwalior; 1925–1948	Succeeded by Monarchy abolished (Merge within the Republic of India)
Political offices
Preceded by Post created 15 June 1948	Rajpramukh of Madhya Bharat; 1948–1956	Succeeded by Post abolished by the Government of India 31 October 1956; succeeded by that of Governor of Madhya Pradesh
Titles in pretence
Preceded by None; monarchy abolished in 1948	— TITULAR — Maharaja of Gwalior; 1948–1961; Reason for succession failure: Monarchy abolished in 1948	Succeeded by Madhavrao III
