= Vijaya Raje Scindia =

Rajmata of Gwalior (1919–2001)

Maharani of Gwalior
- Tenure: 21 February 1941 – 16 July 1961
- Predecessor: Gajra Raje Sahib Scindia
- Successor: Madhavi Raje Scindia

Rajmata of Gwalior
- Tenure: 16 July 1961 – 25 January 2001
- Successor: Madhavi Raje Scindia
- House: Scindia
- Religion: Hinduism

Member of Parliament, Lok Sabha
- In office 5 April 1957 – 2 April 1962
- Preceded by: V. G. Deshpande
- Succeeded by: Ramsahai Pande
- Constituency: Guna, Madhya Pradesh
- In office 2 April 1962 – 4 March 1967
- Preceded by: Suraj Prasad
- Succeeded by: Ram Awtar Sharma
- Constituency: Gwalior, Madhya Pradesh
- In office 15 March 1971 – 18 January 1977
- Preceded by: Yashwant Singh Kushwah
- Succeeded by: Raghubir Singh Machhand
- Constituency: Bhind, Madhya Pradesh
- In office 2 December 1989 – 10 October 1999
- Preceded by: Mahendra Singh
- Succeeded by: Madhavrao Scindia
- Constituency: Guna, Madhya Pradesh

Member of Parliament, Rajya Sabha
- In office 10 April 1978 – 2 December 1989
- Constituency: Madhya Pradesh

Vice President of the Bharatiya Janata Party
- In office 1980–1998
- President: L. K. Advani (1993–1998; 1986–1991); Murli Manohar Joshi (1991–1993); Atal Bihari Vajpayee (1980–1986)

Personal details
- Born: Lekha Divyeshwari Devi; 12 October 1919 Sagar, Central Provinces and Berar, British India
- Died: 25 January 2001 (aged 81) New Delhi, India
- Party: Bharatiya Janata Party (1980–2001)
- Other political affiliations: Indian National Congress (1957-1967); Bharatiya Jana Sangh (1967–1977); Janata Party (1977–1980)
- Spouse: Maharaja Jiwajirao Scindia (m. 1941; died 1961)
- Children: Padma Raje; Usha Raje; Madhavrao Scindia; Vasundhara Raje; Yashodhara Raje
- Parents: Thakur Mahendra Singh (father); Chuda Devashwari Devi (mother)

Vijaya Raje Scindia (born Lekha Divyeshwari Devi; 12 October 1919 – 25 January 2001), known popularly as the Rajmata Scindia, was an Indian politician and consort of the last ruling Maharaja of Gwalior, Jiwajirao Scindia, in British Raj. In later life, she was elected repeatedly to both houses of the Indian parliament. She was one of the founding members of the Bharatiya Janata Party. William Dalrymple wrote in his 1998 book The Age of Kali that she had been called "a madwoman and a saint; a dangerous reactionary and a national saviour; a stubborn and self-righteous old lunatic and a brave and resilient visionary."

== Early years ==
Vijaya Raje Scindia was born in 1919 at Sagar in present-day Madhya Pradesh, the eldest child of feudal Mahendra Singh of the village Gangni, Firozabad district in Uttar Pradesh, a deputy collector in the colonial provincial administration, and his second wife, Chuda Devashwari Devi. She was named Lekha Divyeshwari Devi at birth. Her father was a deputy collector in the provincial administration. Her mother was the daughter of former Commander-in-chief of the Nepalese Army Khadga Shamsher Jang Bahadur Rana, the nephew of founder of Rana dynasty of Nepal, Jang Bahadur Kunwar Rana. She died at Vijaya Raje's birth. Her brother is Dhyanendra Singh, husband of Maya Singh.

== Personal life ==
In February 1941, at the age of 22, Lekha was married to Jiwajirao Scindia, the Maharaja of Gwalior. After marriage her regnal name was Vijaya Raje Scindia

=== Children ===
Vijaya Raje and Jiwajirao had four daughters and a son:

1. Padmavati Raje 'Akkasaheb' Deb Barman (1942–64), who wed Kirit Bikram Kishore Deb Barman, the 185th ruling Maharaja of Tripura.
2. Usha Raje Rana (born 1943), who wed Pashupati Shamsher Jang Bahadur Rana of the Rana dynasty, Nepalese politician and grandson of the last Maharajah of Nepal. They are the parents of Devyani Rana and Urvashi Rana.
3. Madhavrao Scindia (1945–2001), Indian politician belonging to the Indian National Congress and former Union Minister of Railways, Aviation and Human resources development, and the titular Maharaja of Gwalior. He is the father of Jyotiraditya Scindia.
4. Vasundhara Raje (born 1953) BJP politician and a two-term Chief Minister of Rajasthan. She was formerly married to the titular Maharaja of Dholpur.
5. Yashodhara Raje Scindia, formerly Sports Minister of Madhya Pradesh

== Politics ==
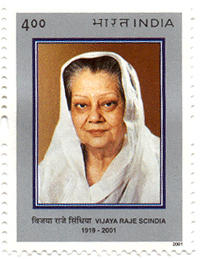
Scindia on a 2001 stamp of India

Scindia was initiated into electoral politics in 1957 when she contested and won the Guna Lok Sabha seat in Madhya Pradesh on a Congress ticket. Five years later, she won on a Congress ticket from Gwalior. Later, she quit the Congress and won the Guna seat in 1967 on Swatantra Party's ticket. She soon joined Bharatiya Jan Sangh and resigned from Lok Sabha to take part in state politics. She won the Karera assembly seat in Madhya Pradesh as the Jan Sangh candidate in 1967 and actively engaged in state politics. Jan Sangh defied the Indira-wave in the 1971 Lok Sabha polls to win 3 seats in Gwalior region – Scindia from Bhind, Vajpayee from Gwalior and Madhavrao Scindia from Guna, though he later left the party. Scindia did not contest Lok Sabha elections in 1977 and 1984 and lost to Indira Gandhi in Rae Bareli in 1980. In 1989, she won from Guna as member of Bharatiya Janata Party (BJP), and retained the seat in 1991, 1996 and 1998. She did not contest the elections in 1999 due to old age. She was jailed by Indira Gandhi during the Emergency, ultimately sharing a cell with fellow Rajmata and MP, Gayatri Devi, in Tihar Jail. In the 1970s, Scindia and her son Madhavrao were involved in a public dispute over property. Animosities heightened due to their differing political ideologies.

She supported the practice of Sati, stating, "self-immolation by a widow in dedication of her husband does not constitute an offence."

Scindia came to the forefront of the BJP leadership in 1980 when she was made one of its vice-presidents. She played a key role in popularising the party's Ram Rath Yatra and was considered a hardliner. Following the demolition of the Babri Masjid in December 1992, she had declared that "she could now die without any regret, for she had seen her dream come true." She remained a BJP vice-president until 1998 when she stepped down on health grounds and quit electoral politics. She died in January 2001.

== Ancestry ==
Ancestors of Vijaya Raje Scindia

4. Thakur Sobaran Singh
2. Thakur Mahendra Singh of Sagar
1. Vijaya Raje Scindia
12. General H.E. Dhir Shamsher Rana
6. General Raja Khadga Shamsher Jang Bahadur Rana
13. Nanda Kumari Thapa
3. Chuda Divyeshwari Devi
7. Rani Dhan Kumari Rajya Lakshmi Devi
