= Kadarji Rao Scindia =

Maharaja of Gwalior from 1763 to 1764

4th Maharaja of Gwalior
- Reign: 1763–10 July 1764
- Predecessor: Jankoji Rao Scindia
- Successor: Manaji Rao Scindia
- Died: 30 January 1778
- House: Scindia
- Father: Tukoji Rao Scindia
- Religion: Hinduism

Kadarji Rao Scindia was the fourth Maharaja of Gwalior State for a brief period. He became Maharaja of Gwalior after two years of death of Jankoji Rao Scindia in Third battle of Panipat in 1761.

He was the son of Tukoji Rao Scindia. However, he refused the appointment, and remained as a nominal peshwa's appointment to a new Sardar which occurred on 10 July 1764 in the person of Manaji Rao Scindia.

Kadarji Rao Scindia Scindia Dynasty Born: ? Died: ?
Regnal titles
Preceded by Jankoji Rao Scindia	Maharaja of Gwalior; 1763 – 1764	Succeeded by Manaji Rao Scindia
