= The Great Maratha =

Indian historical television drama

- Genre: Historical drama
- Written by: Sanjay Khan; Mohafiz Hyder; Reoti Saran Sharma; Manoher D. Malgonkar
- Directed by: Sanjay Khan
- Creative director: S.M.Sadiq
- Starring: Shahbaz Khan; Parikshit Sahni; Farida Jalal; Tom Alter; Irrfan Khan; Mrinal Kulkarni; Kartika Rane; Mukesh Khanna
- Composer: Mohammed Zahur Khayyam
- Country of origin: India
- Original language: Hindi
- No. of seasons: 1
- No. of episodes: 47

Production
- Executive producer: S. Mirza Khan
- Producer: Sanjay Khan
- Production location: Samod
- Cinematography: Tony Rode
- Editors: Sushil Deshpande; Zahir Allauddin
- Production company: Numero Uno International Limited

Original release
- Network: DD National
- Release: 1 February – 20 December 1994

The Great Maratha is an Indian historical drama television series directed by Sanjay Khan and produced by Numero Uno International Limited. The drama aired on DD National. The series is based on the life of Mahadaji Shinde. The show comprised 47 episodes. The music was composed by Mohammed Zahur Khayyam.

== Plot ==
The series starts with the events of 1759 in Delhi, during the declining Mughal empire under emperor Shah Alam II. Weakness of the Mughal empire leads to the invasion of Ahmad Shah Durrani and his army faces the Maratha army on 14 January 1761. The cataclysmic defeat of the Marathas in this Third Battle of Panipat lead to the death of 50000 Marathas and many more. Witnessing this defeat, the Peshwa Balaji Baji Rao dies of mental depression. Then the show follows the life of Mahadji Shinde who was gravely wounded in the battle. But soon Maratha Empire, with his help, recovered Maratha power in North India, restoring Mughal emperor's moral authority as Mughal empire came under Maratha protection. He was awarded the title of grand visier by the Mughal emperor. There is a romance between Mahadji and princess Jumna, blossoming into marriage. Mahadji and Indore's queen Ahilya Bai Holkar develop attraction and have a sublime relationship where they help each other. The British are kept in check due to his efforts.The series ends with a fictional account of Mahadji suddenly falling ill, possibly by poisoning, while eating food with other Maratha officers in Pune, and he dies soon.

== Cast ==
- Arun Mathur as Maharaja Suraj Mal
- Bal Dhuri as Balaji Baji Rao, Nana Saheb Peshwa I
- Shahbaz Khan as Mahadaji Shinde
- Farida Jalal as Chimna Bai
- Kartika Rane as Yamunabai
- Deepraj Rana as Jankoji Rao Scindia
- Pankaj Dheer as Sadashivrao Bhau
- Sanjay Swaraj as Vishwasrao
- Mangal Dhillon as Dattaji Rao Scindia
- Firoz Ali as Tukoji Rao Scindia
- Mukesh Khanna as Ibrahim Khan Gardi
- Rajesh Joshi as Vithal Shivdev Vinchurkar
- Gaazi Shah as Rana Khan
- Shama Deshpande as Gopikabai
- Rahul Awasthee as Madhavrao I
- Madhura Deo as Ramabai Peshwa
- Rinku Dhawan as Gangabai Sathe
- Hariom Parashar as Nana Fadnavis
- Parikshat Sahni as Malhar Rao Holkar
- Mrinal Kulkarni as Ahilyabai Holkar
- Seema Kelkar/Anju Mahendru as Harku Bai Sahib Holkar
- Sanjay Mehendirata as Tukoji Rao Holkar
- Bhushan Jeevan as Raghunath Rao
- Utkarsha Naik as Anandibai
- Rishabh Shukla as Shah Alam II
- Jitendra Trehan as Ghazi ud-Din Khan Feroze Jung III
- Irrfan Khan as Najib ad-Dawlah also Ghulam Kadir
- Bob Christo as Ahmad Shah Durrani
- Maya Alagh as Begum Sadh-ruh-Nissa of Awadh
- Benjamin Gilani as Shuja-ud-Daula
- Faqir Nabi as Barkhurdar Khan
- Tom Alter as Robert Clive
- Noshirwan Jehangir as Warren Hastings
- Arun Bali as Mansoor Shah Baba / Alamgir II
- Sunil Nagar as Benoît de Boigne
