= Rajpramukh =

Administrative title in India (1947–56)

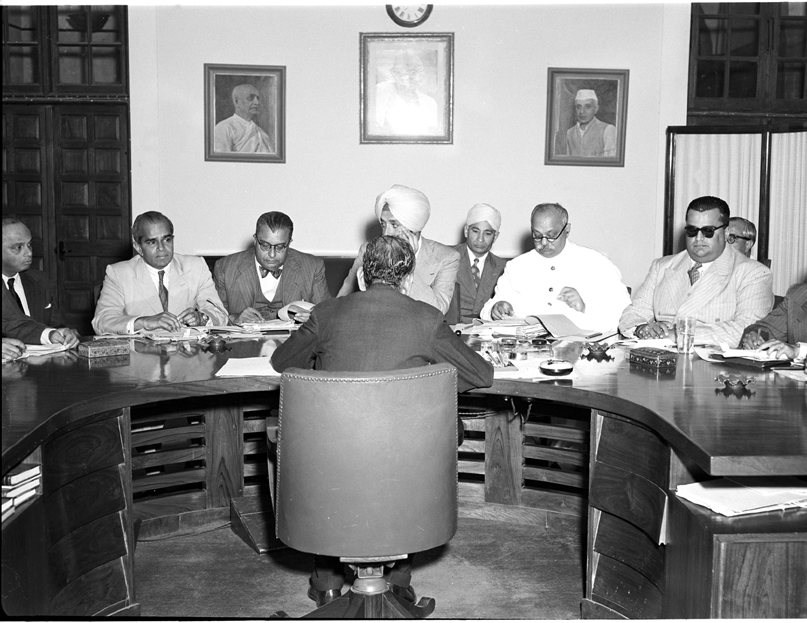
Gopalaswami Ayyangar, Minister for States, Addressing the Rajpramukhs' Conference in New Delhi on 16 March 1952.

Rajpramukh was an administrative title in India that existed from India's independence in 1947 until 1956. They were the appointed governors of certain Indian provinces and states.

== Background ==
The British Indian Empire, which included most of present-day India, Pakistan, and Bangladesh, was made up of two types of political units. British India comprised fifteen provinces, all British possessions, ruled directly by the British in all respects, either through a governor or a chief commissioner, who were officials appointed by the viceroy. Existing alongside British India were a large number of princely states, ruled by local hereditary rulers (subjects of the British Empire), who remained under British suzerainty, including British control of their external affairs, but who also retained local autonomy. At the time of the proclamation of Queen Victoria as Empress of India in 1875, more than 700 Indian princely states and territories enjoyed treaty relations with the British Crown, with the latter as hegemon. The exact relationship between the Government of India (controlled by the British) and these states varied enormously, ranging from treaties of alliance, defence, protection, or supervision to almost outright control. The British Crown assumed control of British India from the East India Company in 1857, and, thereafter, controlled the internal governance through a Secretary of State for India in London and a Viceroy in India.

The hundreds of princely states varied greatly in size, from Hyderabad, with a population of over ten million, to tiny states. Most of the rulers of the princely states worked closely with a British political agent who was responsible to the governor of a British province, but the four largest princely states, Hyderabad, Gwailor, Baroda, Mysore, and Jammu and Kashmir, had Residents directly under the authority of the viceroy. Two agencies, the Central India Agency and Rajputana Agency, were made up of numerous princely states, and their political agents were appointed by the Viceroy.

== After independence under the Dominion of India, 1947–1950 ==
On 20 February 1947, the British government announced its intention to transfer power in British India to Indian hands by June 1948. However, by 16 May 1947, the Cabinet Mission Plan had failed to evolve a constitution for India acceptable to all contending parties. Subsequently, the British government announced on 3 June 1947 its intention to partition British India into two dominions. On 15 July 1947, the House of Commons passed the Indian Independence Act 1947, formalising the division of British India into the dominions of India and Pakistan. The House of Lords followed suit the next day. The Bill received the Royal assent on 18 July 1947. From that day, the suzerainty of the British Crown over the Indian princely states lapsed as per 7(b) of the India Independence Act 1947, and with it all treaties between the British Crown and the Indian states also had a legal quietus. The rulers of the Indian states became sovereign rulers from 18 July 1947, and, in principle, they were free to accede to either of the two dominions or to remain independent. As per the provisions of the Act, on 15 August 1947, two independent dominions of India and Pakistan were established. The leaders spearheading the Indian independence movement against the British put strong pressure on the Indian princes to accede their states to the Dominion of India. By 15 August 1947, virtually all of the rulers had signed an Instrument of Accession with the Governor-General of India, giving power to the dominion government to make laws on the three subjects of foreign policy, communication and defence, and otherwise they remained sovereign rulers. These rulers also signed another agreement known as the "Stand Still Agreement", to provide continuity to any existing agreements between British India and their States.

Three Indian states, namely Hyderabad, Jammu and Kashmir, and Junagadh, failed to accede to either of the dominions. The 1947 Poonch Rebellion in the western fringes of the princely state of Kashmir erupted as a popular uprising, driven by animosity against the state's unpopular Maharaja, with high taxation, neglect of World War II veterans, and the desire of the Muslim majority to join Pakistan being the prime drivers. Jammu, together with parts of Kashmir, was incorporated into India after the Maharaja, Hari Singh, sought Indian military intervention against the uprising and the irregular Pakistani militia, who came to the rebels' aid; India agreed to lend military assistance only if the Maharaja acceded to India, which he did. In time, the two remaining states of Hyderabad and Junagadh (governed by Muslim rulers) were invaded and annexed by India.

In 1948, the Maharaja of Gwalior signed a covenant with the rulers of the adjoining princely states to form a new state known as Madhya Bharat. This new covenanting state was to be governed by a council of the rulers with a head known as Rajpramukh. This new state signed a fresh Instrument of Accession with the Indian dominion. Subsequently, many other Indian states merged with their neighbouring Indian states on the same lines to form the covenanting states known as Vindhya Pradesh, Patiala and East Punjab States Union (PEPSU), Rajputana, etc.

== Rajpramukhs in the Republic of India, 1950–1956 ==
In the intervening period, the Dominion Government of India had set up a Constitution Assembly to formulate a new Constitution for India. Simultaneously, each of the independent Indian rulers and Rajpramukhs of covenanting states had set up Constituent Assemblies for their respective states and also sent their representatives to the Constituent Assembly of India so as to make uniform laws for their respective states. The thinking among Indian leaders at that time was that each princely state or covenanting state would remain independent as a federal state along the lines suggested originally by the 1935 Act. But as the drafting of the constitution progressed and the idea of forming a republic took concrete shape, it was decided that all the princely states/covenanting states would merge with the Republic of India, and all the erstwhile Maharajas would be provided with a privy purse and privileges as enjoyed by them on 15 August 1947 by constitutional guarantees. Hence, Articles 294, 362, 366, and 363 were incorporated in the constitution. Besides, it was also decided that the Maharaja of Gwalior, Maharaja of Mysore, the Maharaja of Jammu & Kashmir, the Nizam of Hyderabad, and the Rajpramukhs of the covenanting states would continue to be the constitutional heads of their respective states. By 26 October 1949, the constituent assembly had finalised a new constitution for India and all the acceding Indian princely states and the covenanting states merged with the new Republic of India. In accordance with constitutional provisions, all the Maharajas entered into another agreement with the Governor-General of India to provide for the specific privy purse amount, the right to their personal properties (as distinct from state properties), and the right to succession in accordance with the practice in their territories. These agreements were entered into before 26 January 1950 so as to bring them within the ambit of Art. 363. On 26 January 1950, India became a republic upon the enactment of the constitution. The new constitution created four types of administrative divisions in India: nine Part A states, the former British provinces, which were ruled by an appointed governor and state legislature; eight Part B states, former princely states or groups of covenanting states, which were governed by a Rajpramukh; ten Part C states, including both former princely states and provinces, which were governed by a chief commissioner; and a union territory ruled by a governor appointed by the President of India.

As per Art.366 of the Indian Constitution (as it existed in 1950):

Art 366(21): Rajpramukh means-
(a) in relation to the State of Hyderabad, the person for the time being is recognised by the President as Nizam of Hyderabad.;
(b) in relation to the State of Jammu and Kashmir or the State of Mysore, the person who for the time being is recognised by the President as the Maharaja of that State;
and (c) in relation to any other State specified in Part B of the First Schedule, the person who for the time being is recognised by the President as the Rajpramukh of that State, and includes in relation to any of the said States any person for the time being recognised by the President as competent to exercise Madhya Bharat, Vindhya Pradesh, Patiala and East Punjab States Union (PEPSU), and Rajasthan.

== Governing Rajpramukhs, 1948–1956 ==
- Hyderabad State had its last Nizam, Mir Osman Ali Khan (b. 1886 -d. 1967) as Rajpramukh of the state from 26 January 1950 to 31 October 1956.
- Patiala and East Punjab States Union had Yadavindra Singh (b. 1913 -d. 1974), the Maharaja of Patiala, as the Rajpramukh and had Jagatjit Singh (b. 1872 -d. 1949), the Maharaja of Kapurthala, as the Uprajpramukh (Deputy Rajpramukh).
- Saurashtra had Krishna Kumarsinhji Bhavsinhji (b. 1912 -d. 1965), the former Maharaja of Bhavnagar State, and Digvijaysinhji Ranjitsinhji (b. 1895 -d. 1966), the former Maharaja of Nawanagar State, as acting and regular Rajpramukh respectively. Meanwhile, Meghrajji III, the former Maharaja of Dhrangadhra State, on the establishment of the United State of Kathiawar (Saurashtra) in 1948, was installed as Uprajpramukh (Deputy Rajpramukh) and he served as Acting Rajpramukh during the absence of the Rajpramukh.
- Mysore had the Maharaja of Mysore, Jayachamaraja Wodeyar Bahadur (b. 1919 -d. 1974) as Rajpramukh. He continued as governor from 1 November 1956 to 4 May 1964. He held office as Governor of Madras State (present-day Tamil Nadu) from 4 May 1964 to 26 June 1966.
- Travancore-Cochin state had the last Maharaja of Travancore, Bala Rama Varma II (b. 1912 -d. 1991) as Rajpramukh from 1 July 1949 – 31 October 1956.
- Madhya Bharat had the last Maharaja of Gwalior, Jiwajirao Scindia (b. 1916 -d. 1961) as Rajpramukh from 28 May 1948 to 31 October 1956.
- Rajasthan had several Rajpramukhs, Bhim Singh II (1909-1991), the Maharao of Kota, from 25 March 1948 to 18 April 1948 and Bhopal Singh (b. 1884 -d. 1955), the Maharana of Udaipur, from 18 April 1948 – 1 April 1949, then continuing with the designation of Maha Rajpramukh from 1 April 1949 to 4 July 1955; and Man Singh II, Maharajah of Jaipur, from April 1949 to October 1956. The Maharana of Udaipur was appointed Rajpramukh and Kota Naresh was appointed Up-Rajpramukh of the Union of many former princely states of Rajasthan, and subsequently Maharana Bhupal Singh of Udaipur was appointed the Maha-Rajpramukh and the Kota Naresh was appointed the Up-Rajpramukh.
- Vindhya Pradesh had Rameshwar Prasad Singh, Maharaja of Singrauli as Rajpramukh but then he died, so Martand Singh the Maharaja of Rewa was appointed.

== After 1956 ==
On 1 November 1956, the States Reorganisation Act took effect, which erased the distinction between parts A, B, and C states, and reorganised state boundaries along linguistic lines. Of the Part B states, Rajputana was merged with Ajmer-Merwara state to become Rajasthan; Hyderabad was partitioned among Mysore, Andhra Pradesh, and Bombay state; Saurashtra was merged into Bombay state; Travancore-Cochin was merged with Malabar district to form the new state of Kerala; Madhya Bharat and Vindhya Pradesh were merged into Madhya Pradesh; Patiala and East Punjab States Union (PEPSU) was merged into Punjab state, and Mysore state was enlarged with the addition of Coorg state and parts of Bombay, Madras and Hyderabad states.

By 1956, the system of voluntary unions of states was dismantled and the position of Rajpramukh abolished. New states were created along linguistic and ethnic lines, which tore apart the traditional ties that existed in the former princely states. As the princely rulers died one by one, more time was being taken before their successors were recognised by the Government of India. When they were recognised, it was usually after they were persuaded to accept lower privy purses or reductions in privileges. But many influential Maharajahs and Maharanis were not content with being mere nominal title holders enjoying privileges. They started contesting in elections either as independents or by joining political parties. Growing popularity and success of many of the former royalty in the hustings, particularly Gayatri Devi of Jaipur and Rajmata of Gwalior, Vijaya Raje Scindia, among others was not to the liking of Indira Gandhi, who had become prime minister by 1966.

By the year 1969, Indian National Congress had split into Congress (Organisational) and Congress (Requisitionist). Congress (R) was headed by Mrs. Indira Gandhi: against the backdrop of soaring unemployment, food insecurity, and chronic poverty, she led the "Garibi Hatao" movement (English for "stop poverty"), one of whose measures included the promise to abolish the royal order by depriving former princes of the mounting privy purse (which led to soaring costs to the public exchequer); furthermore, her government also wished to abolish the old order which was incompatible with the principles of a democratic, secular, and socialist India. She de-recognized all the Maharajahs by a presidential order in 1969. This, however, was struck down by the Supreme Court of India. Eventually, the Government of India, by the 26th Amendment of the Constitution of India, was successful in abolishing the princely order. This process was completed by the end of 1971. Though a challenge to this amendment was mounted in the Supreme Court, the court neither heard the matter immediately nor gave any relief to the rulers. The case was ultimately decided against the rulers by as late as in 1993, by which time it had become fait accompli.

Erstwhile princely states' rulers have since only enjoyed their traditional styles and titles on a social basis by stylising themselves as such, retaining them notwithstanding any formal recognition or legal merit or basis. V. P. Singh the former Raja Bahadur of Manda, was the Prime Minister of India. Former royals like Captain Amarinder Singh (Maharaja of Patiala), Vasundhara Raje Scindia of Dholpur, Virbhadra Singh of Bushahr and Pratapsingh Rane of Sattari even rose to post of Chief Ministers of Punjab, Rajasthan, Himachal Pradesh, and Goa respectively. Many others like Srikantadatta Narasimharaja Wadiyar (Maharaja of Mysore) and his heir Yaduveer Krishnadatta Chamaraja Wadiyar, Digvijay Singh, Madhavrao Scindia and his son Jyotiraditya Scindia, Arjun Singh, and others have been active in politic, serving as governors, ministers, MPs and MLAs at different times.

== In popular culture ==
Mehboob Khan's 1952 film Aan features a plot revolving around a Rajpramukh dynasty in the early 1950s.
