= Jankoji Rao Scindia =

Maharaja of Gwalior from 1755 to 1761

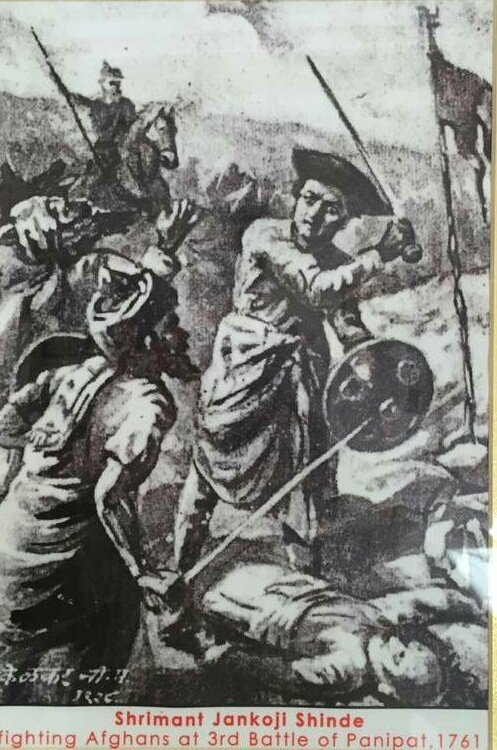

3rd Maharaja of Gwalior
- Reign: 25 July 1755 – 14 January 1761
- Predecessor: Jayappaji Rao Scindia
- Successor: Kadarji Rao Scindia
- Born: c. 1745
- Died: 14 January 1761 (aged 15–16); Panipat
- Military career
- Allegiance: Maratha Empire
- Branch: Maratha Army
- Service years: 1755–1761
- Rank: Sarnaubat
- Unit: Maratha cavalry
- Conflicts: Raghuji's Southern Campaign; Nizam-Maratha war (1751-52); Battle of Merta (1755); Siege of Jodhpur (1756); Capture of Nagore (1756); Battle of Delhi (1757); Battle of Sindkhed; Invasion of Jaipur (1758); Battle of Barari Ghat; Capture of Delhi; Battle of Kunjpura; Third Battle of Panipat

Jankoji Rao Shinde (c. 1745 – 14 January 1761) was the third Maharaja of Gwalior State from 1755 until his death in 1761. He became Maharaja of Gwalior after the death of his father, Jayappaji Rao Scindia, at the age of 10.

== Biography ==
He was only son and youngest child of Jayappa Rao Scindia, and ascended to the throne of Gwalior on the death of his father on 25 July 1755. As he was only 10 years of age at that time, a regency was established, led by his uncle Dattaji Rao Shinde, Jayappaji's brother, which lasted until 10 January 1760 when Dattaji was killed and defeated in Battle of Barari Ghat.

=== Third Battle of Panipat ===
He fought against the Afghans at the Third battle of Panipat on 14 January 1761. Jankoji with around 7,000 troops was positioned to the right of Shamsher Bahadur and was opposed to Najib Khan Rohilla. When the news spread that Vishwas Rao has been shot dead, Jankoji and his uncle Tukoji on seeing the thinning crowd at the Maratha centre rushed to help Sadashiv Rao Bhau. Jankoji fought the Afghans who had penetrated into Maratha centre.

Jankoji was taken prisoner by Barkhurdar Khan secretly. Kashiraj met Jankoji secretly in a tent of Barkhurdar Khan, he was wounded with a ball and with a spear in the arm. Kashiraj was told by Moti Lal, the Diwan of Barkhurdar Khan that Jankoji would be released if a ransom of seven lakhs would be paid. These dealings became known to Najib Khan who instigated Wazir Shah Wali to take this matter up to Ahmad Shah Abdali. Abdali then ordered his nasaqchis to search for Jankoji, Barkhurdar fearing harmful consequences ordered his men to murder Jankoji and bury him privately. Later on few imposters of Jankoji claimed themselves as the Shinde chief but their all claims were proven wrong by the Scindia survivors.

== Succession ==
After the death of Jankoji, the Scindia clan remained without any leader for two years. Finally in 1763, Kadarji Rao Scindia was appointed as new leader of the clan.

== In popular culture ==
- In the 1994 Hindi TV series The Great Maratha, Jankoji's character was portrayed by Deepraj Rana.
- In the 2019 Hindi film Panipat, Jankoji's Character was played by Gashmeer Mahajani.

Jankoji Rao Scindia Scindia Dynasty Born: 1745 Died: 1761
Regnal titles
Preceded by Jayappaji Rao Scindia	Maharaja of Gwalior; 1755–1761	Succeeded by Kadarji Rao Scindia
