= George Castle =

George Castle may refer to:

== Places ==
- George Castle, in India's Madhav National Park
- George Castle, a.k.a. "John George Bastion", in the Königstein Fortress

== People ==
- George Castle (physician) (c. 1635–1673), English physician
- George Castle (journalist), American sports journalist and author
- George Castle (lacrosse) (born 1984), American lacrosse player

== Fiction ==
- George Castle (Law & Order: UK), a character in the UK TV series Law & Order: UK

== See also ==
- St George's Castle (disambiguation)
- George Castledine (died 2018), British nursing educator and nursing consultant
