= Madhya Bharat =

Former state of India (1947–1957)

Coordinates: 26.22°N 78.17°E

- State of India
- 1948–1956
- Location of Madhya Bharat in India, 1951
- Capital: Gwalior
- Area
  - 1881: 194,000 km^{2} (75,000 sq mi)
- Population
  - 1881: 9,261,907
- History
  - Abolition of the Central India Agency: 1948
  - Creation of Madhya Pradesh State: 1956
Preceded by	Succeeded by
Central India Agency; Gwalior Residency	Madhya Pradesh

Madhya Bharat, also known as Malwa Union, was an Indian state in west-central India, created on 28 May 1948 from twenty-five princely states which until 1947 had been part of the Central India Agency, with Jiwajirao Scindia as its Rajpramukh.

The union had an area of 46,478 square miles (120,380 km^{2}). Gwalior was made the capital and the first legislative assembly took place inside the Moti Mahal of Gwalior. It was bordered by the states of Bombay (presently Gujarat and Maharashtra) to the southwest, Rajasthan to the northwest, Uttar Pradesh to the north, and Vindhya Pradesh to the east, and Bhopal State and Madhya Pradesh to the southeast. The population was mostly Hindu and Hindi-speaking. On 1 November 1956, Madhya Bharat, together with the states of Vindhya Pradesh and Bhopal State, was merged into Madhya Pradesh.

== Districts ==
Madhya Bharat comprised sixteen districts and these districts were initially divided into three Commissioners' Divisions, which were later reduced to two. The districts were:

1. Bhind District
2. Gird District
3. Morena District
4. Guna District
5. Shivpuri District
6. Rajgarh District
7. Bhilsa District
8. Shajapur District
9. Ujjain District
10. Indore District
11. Dewas District
12. Ratlam District
13. Dhar District
14. Jhabua District
15. Nimar District
16. Mandsaur District

== Politics ==
The nominal head of Madhya Bharat state was Rajpramukh (Governor). It had also the post of an Uparajpramukh. The state had a Vidhan Sabha of 99 members, who were elected from 79 constituencies (59 single member and 20 double member). There were 9 Lok Sabha constituencies in the state (7 single member and 2 double member).

Jivaji Rao Scindia was Rajpramukh of the state from 28 May 1948 to 31 October 1956 and Liladhar Joshi was the first Chief Minister. He was succeeded by Gopi Krishna Vijayvargiya in May 1949. On 18 October 1950, Takhatmal Jalori became the third Chief Minister of Madhya Bharat.

In the 1952 Madhya Bharat Legislative Assembly election, the Indian National Congress won 75 seats and the Hindu Mahasabha won 11 seats. Mishrilal Gangwal of Indian National Congress became the Chief Minister on 3 March 1952. After his resignation, Takhatmal Jain (Jalori) again became the Chief Minister on 16 April 1955. He was the Chief Minister of the state till 31 October 1956.

== Geography ==
Madhya Bharat state was situated in the Madhya Bharat plateau (presently lying under most of northwestern Madhya Pradesh state and central Rajasthan). This plateau is bounded by the Indo-Gangetic Plain to the north, the Bundelkhand upland to the east, the Malwa Plateau to the south, and the East Rajasthan Uplands on the west.
