= Jayappaji Rao Scindia =

Maharaja of Gwalior from 1745 to 1755

Jayappaji Rao Shinde
- Sardar
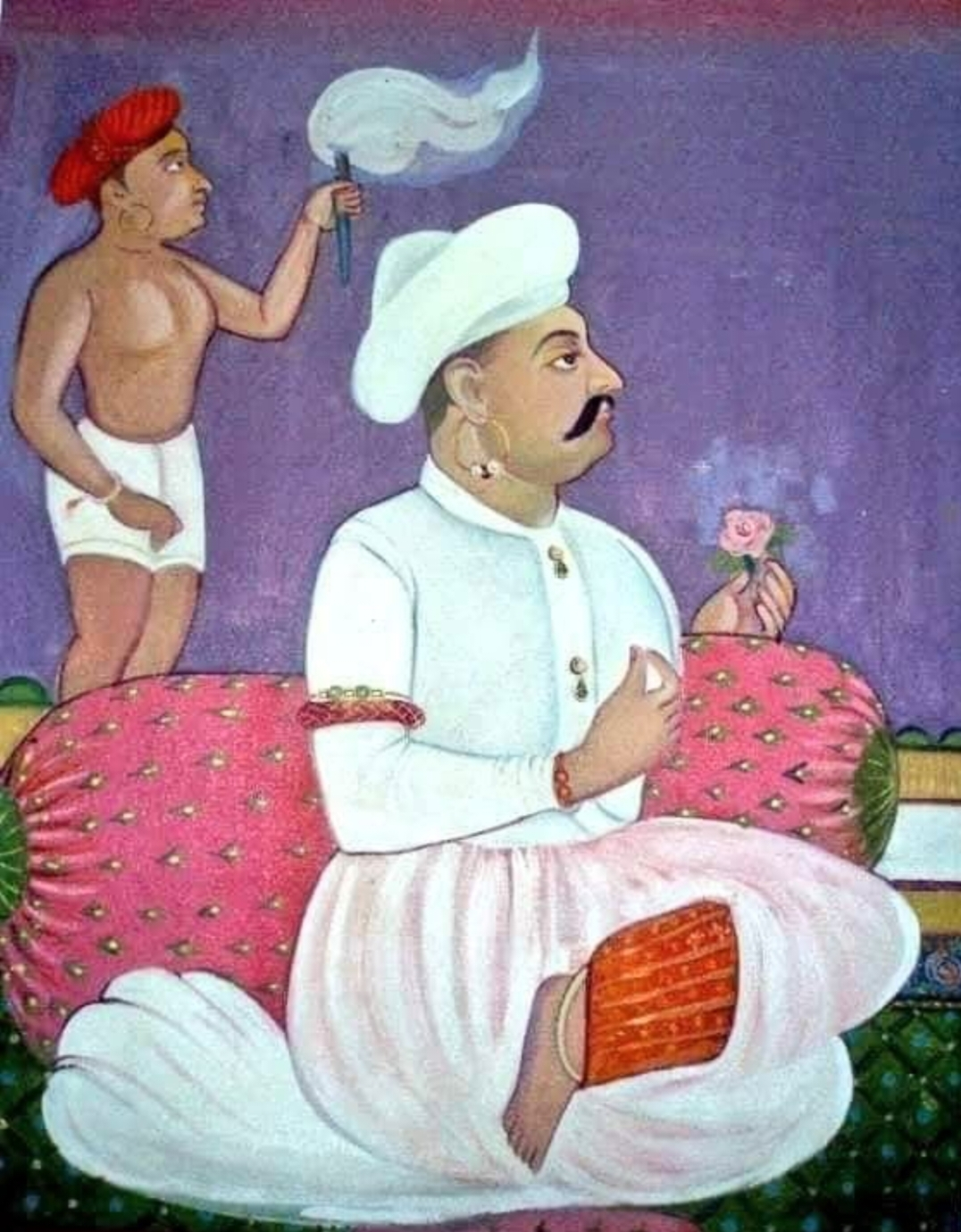
- Potrait of Jayappaji Rao Shinde

Maharaja of Gwalior
- Reign: 3 July 1745 – 25 July 1755
- Predecessor: Ranoji Scindia
- Successor: Jankoji Rao Scindia
- Born: c. 1720
- Died: 25 July 1755 (aged 34–35); Nagaur, Rajasthan
- Issue: Jankoji Rao Scindia
- Father: Ranoji Rao Scindia
- Mother: Maina Bai
- Religion: Hinduism

Jayappaji Rao Shinde (Note: Alternatively spelled as Sindhia) (c. 1720 – 25 July 1755), also known as Jayappa Dadasahib, was a Maratha general and the Maharaja of Gwalior in northern India from 1745 to 1755, succeeding his father Ranoji Rao Scindia who had founded it.

He was killed by two men named Khokar Kesar Khan and Shri Kan Singhji, who were adherents of Maharaja Vijay Singh of Jodhpur, before the walls of Nagaur in Rajasthan on 25 July 1755, after entanglement in the affairs of Jodhpur.

He was succeeded by his son Jankoji Rao Scindia, who was killed at the Third Battle of Panipat in 1761.

Jayappa had four daughters who married in the knight families of Shinde, including one in Nimbalkar, two in Ghorpade and one in the house of Savant - Bhonsle family. Jankoji Shinde married Kashibai Nimbalkar, sister of Vyankatrao and Janrao Nimbalkar of Phaltan, both Sardars of the Nizam of Hyderabad, hailing from Phaltan.

== See also ==
- Scindia
