= Jyotiba Rao Scindia =

18th century Indian noble

Jyotiba Rao Scindia (1726 – January 1760) was the third son of Ranoji Rao Scindia and Maina Bai and the elder half brother of Mahadaji Scindia.

In 1742, the Marathas were attacked by the Nizam of Hyderabad at Berar and Belur. Jyotiba and Mahadaji — both the Shinde brothers — along with only 1,500 army under Sadashivrao Bhau’s army defeated Nizam.

He died at Kumbher near Deeg, in January 1760.

== See also ==
- Scindia
