= George Castle (physician) =

English physician

George Castle FRS
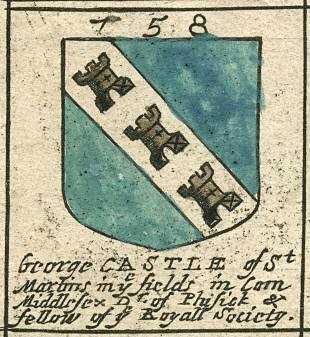
- Arms of George Castle (1673)
- Born: c. 1635
- Died: 12 October 1673
- Education: Balliol College, Oxford; All Souls College, Oxford

George Castle, FRS (c. 1635–1673) was an English physician.

== Life ==
George Castle, only son of John Castle, a doctor of medicine of Oxford of 10 July 1644, by Grisagon his wife, was born in or about 1635. After a good preliminary education at Thame Grammar School, under William Burt (1608–1679), he was admitted a commoner of Balliol College, Oxford, on 8 April 1652, at the age of seventeen, and proceeded BA on 18 October 1654, MA on 29 May 1657. Meanwhile he had gained a probationary fellowship at All Souls in 1655, and accumulating his degrees in physic proceeded MD as a member of that house on 21 June 1665.

Castle settled in town, where he practised, as his father had done, in the parish of St. Margaret's, Westminster. In February 1669 he was elected a fellow of the Royal Society, and, as he himself indicates in the epistle dedicatory prefixed to his Chymical Galenist, had thoughts of presenting himself before the College of Physicians for examination as a candidate. Afterwards, by the influence of his friend Martin Clifford, master of the Charterhouse, Castle was appointed physician to that institution, and obtained a respectable share of business.

Giving way, according to Wood's own statement, to habits of free living, he died of fever on 12 October 1673. His will, wherein he is described as of the parish of St. Martin's-in-the-Fields, is dated 25 September in that year, and was proved by his relict Anne on 16 October following.

== Works ==
Castle was the author of The Chymical Galenist: a Treatise, wherein the Practise of the Ancients is reconcil'd to the new Discoveries in the Theory of Physick; shewing, That many of their Rules, Methods, and Medicins, are useful for the Curing of Diseases in this Age, and in the Northern parts of the World. In which are some Reflections upon a Book, intituled, Medela Medicinæ, 8vo, London, 1667.

== Bibliography ==
- Goodwin, Gordon (1887). "Castle, George" . In Stephen, Leslie (ed.). Dictionary of National Biography. Vol. 9. London: Smith, Elder & Co. p. 274.
