= Ranoji Scindia =

Maharaja of Gwalior from 1731 to 1745

- Maharaja
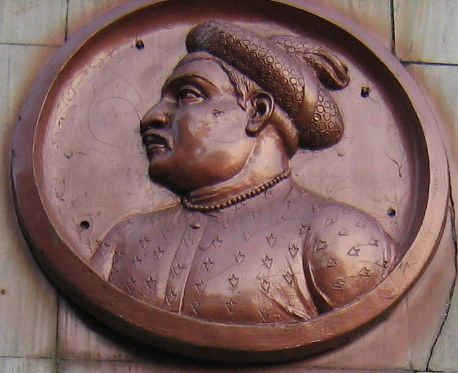
- A plaque outside Shaniwar Wada in Pune

1st Maharaja Scindia of Gwalior
- Reign: 1731–1745
- Successor: Jayappaji Rao Scindia
- Born: c. 1700
- Died: 3 July 1745 (aged 44–45); Shujalpur, Malwa, Maratha Empire modern day Madhya Pradesh, India
- Spouse: Maina Bai; Chima Bai
- Issue: Jayappaji Rao Scindia; Dattaji Rao Scindia; Jyotiba Rao Scindia; Tukoji Rao Scindia; Mahadji Scindia
- House: Scindia
- Father: Jankoji Scindia I
- Religion: Hinduism
- Military career
- Allegiance: Maratha Empire
- Rank: Sardar; Maharaja
- Commands: Gwalior State
- Conflicts: Battle of Palkhed; Battle of Jaitpur; Battle of Vasai; Battle of Dabhoi

Ranoji Scindia (c. 1700 – 3 July 1745), also known as Ranoji Sendrak, was a Maratha military commander and the founder of the Scindia dynasty, and the first monarch establishing the Gwalior State as an independent ruler. He served the Peshwas of the Maratha Empire in several military campaigns. The Scindia dynasty rose to prominence in the 18th century and went on to dominate central and north India as one of the most prominent powers due to their influential presence in Delhi, robust tax collection system (Chauth) from neighboring rulers, and their highly modernized army.

== Early life ==
Ranoji Scindia was born in a Maratha family, his father Jankoji Rao I was the hereditary Patils (Sarpanch) of Kanherkhed, a village in present-day Satara district in the Indian state of Maharashtra. His forefathers in the previous centuries had served as shiledars (cavalrymen) under the Bahmani Sultanate. They held jagirs and many times served as the Patils or Sarpanch (head of the village) between 15th to 16th century.

== Career ==
As a young man, Ranoji started in the service of Balaji Vishwanath Peshwa. At that time Ramchandrababa Sukhtankar, one of the Peshwa's diplomats, recognised Ranoji's talents and had him made the personal bodyguard of the Peshwa's son, Bajirao I. Upon the death of his father, Bajirao was appointed as the Peshwa at the age of twenty by Chhatrapati Shahu. This evoked jealousy from senior officials at the Maratha court. This in turn led Baji Rao to promote talented young men who were barely out of teens such as Ranoji Scindia, Malhar Rao Holkar, the Pawar brothers, Pilaji Jadhav, and Fateh Singh Bhosle as commanders of his troops. None of these men belonged to families that held hereditary Deshmukhi rights under earlier rulers such as the Deccan Sultanates.

Ranoji, was in charge of the Maratha campaign initiated by Peshwa Bajirao in Malwa in 1726. After winning the Malwa, Ranoji established his capital at Ujjain in 1731. He appointed Ramchandrababa Sukhtankar as his dewan, or administrator, and Made Yashaji Rambhaji as sarsenapati of his army, while he spent most of his life on military campaign. Some historians credit Ranoji for bringing the Kumbh mela to Ujjain in 1732. An early account of the Haridwar Kumbh Mela was published by Captain Thomas Hardwicke in 1796 CE.

== Family ==
Ranoji had five sons: Jayappa rao, Jyotibarao, Dattajirao, Tukojirao, and Mahadji Scindia. The eldest four died fighting in various battles in northern India between 1750-1761. Mahadji, the youngest, had an illustrious career in the second half of the 18th century. His descendants were the rulers of the Princely state of Gwalior during the British colonial period (1810-1947).

== See also ==
- Scindia

Ranoji Scindia Scindia Dynasty Born: - Died: 1745
Regnal titles
Preceded by None	Maharaja of Gwalior; 1731–1745	Succeeded by Jayappaji Rao Scindia
