= Kaliadeh Palace =

15th-century palace in central India

Coordinates: 23.249°N 75.778°E

Kaliadeh Palace is a palace on the banks of the Shipra River in Ujjain, Madhya Pradesh. It was built by the Sultan of Mandu in 1458 AD during the time of Mahmud Khilji. Persian inscriptions there record the visits of Emperor Akbar and Jehangir.

The palace was damaged by Pindaris during the Pindari war but was restored by Maharaja Sir Madho Rao Scindia of Gwalior in 1920.

The property is now owned by the Scindia Family.
