= East Rajasthan Uplands =

The East Rajasthan Uplands, also known as the Marwar Uplands, form a region of rolling plateaus with rounded hills and forested areas. Located in the western part of the Aravali Range in Rajasthan, northwest India, the region is part of the Central Highlands of India. These highlands range in altitude from 250 to 500 m above sea level and the terrain slopes down to the east. The uplands region has been shaped by erosion from the Banas River network. The soil in this region is fertile but sandy, and is prone to erosion.

== See also ==
- Geography of Rajasthan
- Geography of India
- Geology of India
