= Tukoji Rao Scindia =

Indian noble (died 1761)

Tukoji Rao Scindia (after 1727 - 14 January 1761) aka Baba Sahib was the fourth son of Ranoji Rao Scindia and elder brother of Mahadaji Scindia. He was killed at the Third Battle of Panipat, 14 January 1761. He was also father of Kadarji Rao Scindia and Anand Rao Scindia and grandfather of Daulat Rao Scindia.

== In popular culture ==
- In the 1994 Hindi TV series The Great Maratha, Tukoji's character was portrayed by Firoz Ali.

== See also ==
- Scindia
