= Kanherkhed =

Village in Maharashtra

Coordinates: 17°38′49″N 74°13′47″E

Kanherkhed is a village in Satara district, Maharashtra, India. It was the home village of Scindia family that later ruled the Gwalior State. Scindia's are Deshmukh's of Kanherkhed Village.
