= Battle of Lalsot =

1787 battle in Rajasthan, India

Battle of Lalsot / Battle of Tunga
Date	28th July 1787
Location	Lalsot
Result	Militarily indecisive, Strategic Maratha victory
Territorial changes	Status quo antebellum

Belligerents
Gwalior State	Kingdom of Jaipur; Kingdom of Marwar

Commanders and leaders
Mahadji Shinde; General de Boigne; Khande Rao Hari; Devi singh Rajdhar Gujar; Ambaji Ingle	Pratap Singh of Jaipur; Bhim Singh

Strength
Unknown number of men under Mahadji; 20,000 reinforcements under Khande Rao Hari, Boigne and Ambaji Ingle; 300 foot soldiers under Devi Singh rajdhar(Gurjar)	20,000 feudal levies from Jaipur; 5,000 Rathore horsemen from Jodhpur; 5,000 Naga infantry from Jodhpur

Casualties and losses
Heavy, 4,000+ killed many wounded	Heavy, 1,000+ Rathore Horsemen from Jodhpur

The Battle of Tunga (also known as Battle of Lalsot) was a battle fought between the Rajput kingdoms of Jaipur and Jodhpur against the Marathas under Mahadji Scindia over the collection of taxes from the Rajput kingdoms on 28th July 1787. Mahadji, as the Naib Vakil-i-Mutlaq of the Mughal Emperor, demanded Rs. 63,00,000 from the Jaipur court. These demands were refused, and Mahadji marched against Jaipur with his army in 1787. Before the battle, a portion of the Mughal army under Hamdani deserted and defected to the Rajput army. The battle ended inconclusively, with neither side achieving a decisive victory. While the Rajputs initially claimed victory due to successfully repelling Maratha attacks, the Marathas also retreated due to a combination of factors, including the terrain and approaching darkness.

== Battle ==
The battle commenced with a cannonade from both sides. The Jaipur army maintained a defensive position, utilizing their long-range artillery. The cannonade continued until 11:00 AM. The Maratha army faced casualties due to their light artillery, which was ineffective against the Rajput cannons. The Rathore horsemen of Jodhpur grew impatient and, against orders from their general Bhim Singh, approximately 4,000 of them, including chieftains and family heads, charged the Maratha army. Benoît de Boigne's Campoos infantry countered with artillery and musket fire, inflicting heavy casualties on the Rathors. Despite this, the Rathors pressed their attack, broke through the Maratha left wing, and killed many Maratha soldiers. The Rathors advanced deep into the Maratha lines and attacked De Boigne, forcing him to retreat after a brief engagement.

Upon seeing his left wing falter, Rana Khan dispatched reinforcements under Shivaji Vithal, Rayaji Patil, and Khande Hari. These reinforcements rallied the fleeing soldiers and engaged in "the bloodiest and most obstinate struggle of the day." However, the Jaipur army did not capitalize on the opening created by the Rathor charge and maintained their positions. As the Maratha reserves approached and without any reinforcements, the Rathors began to lose morale and were eventually pushed back.

The right wing of the Maratha army fared better when a stray cannon shot killed Muhammad Beg Hamdani. Hamdani's soldiers charged the Maratha right wing but were repulsed. Upon learning of their general's death, the Mughals ceased their attacks on the Maratha army.

The Rathors made multiple attempts to capture the Maratha artillery, charging the Maratha army four times, but were repelled each time. The two armies held their positions until midnight and then retreated to their camps. Mahadji refrained from advancing, as he was unaware of Muhammad Beg's death and feared that the Rajput and Mughal soldiers within his own army might defect. Some cannon fire continued, but both sides remained in their camps for the remainder of the engagement.

== Aftermath ==
Mahadji was forced to retreat on August 1, 1787, after all successive charges by the Rathore cavalry were repulsed, and no Maratha gunnery could be captured. The Rajputs also suffered higher casualties, primarily within the Jodhpur army, which lost over a thousand Rathor horsemen. The Marathas did not manage to rout the enemy from their camps because they were unaware of Hamadani's death until nightfall. Additionally, rain began in the afternoon, making the sandy plain difficult for artillery movement. The Marathas were also wary of the ravines in front of them, the approaching darkness, and the scarcity of wells in the area. Consequently, each side retreated to its camp and engaged in sporadic firing until an hour after sunset to guard against surprise attacks in the darkness. Thus, the battle of Tunga, sometimes miscalled that of Lalsot, "though sanguinary, had no decisive result."

Ultimately, Mahadaji Shinde's forces had to retreat due to treachery, dissension within his ranks, and the failure of provisions. Upon learning of the situation in Rajputana and the Maratha failure at Lalsot, Nana Fadnavis, the senior Minister of the Peshwa, sent an additional 10,000 soldiers to assist Mahadji Shinde.
