= Shinde Chhatri =

Historic structure in Pune, India

- India
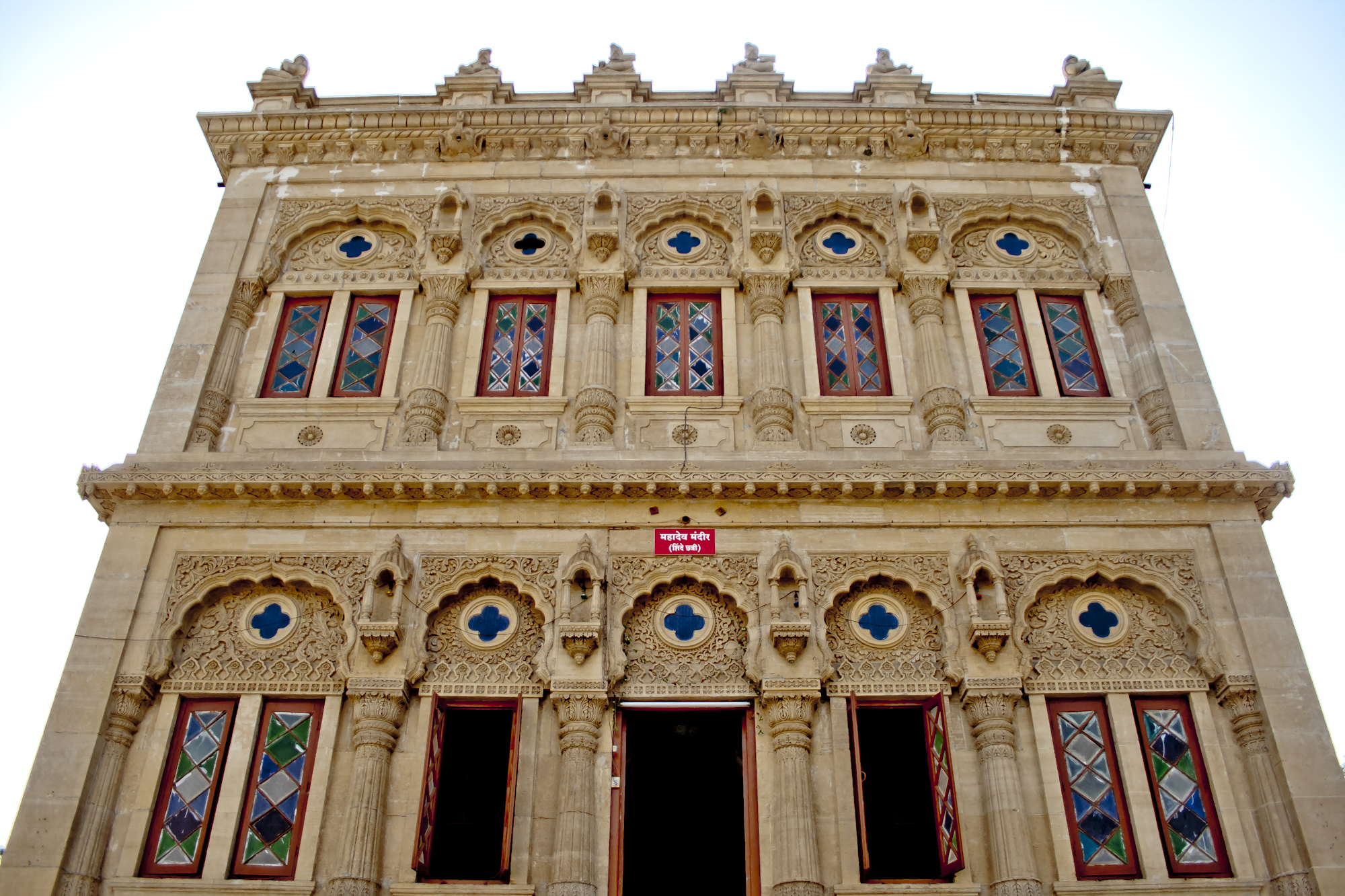
- For Mahadji Shinde, commander-in-chief of the Maratha Empire
- Established: 1794
- Location: Wanwadi, Pune, India Location of Shinde Chhatri in Maharashtra. Inset shows Maharashtra in India.

Shinde Chhatri (Marathi : शिंदे छत्री) at Wanawadi in Pune, India is a memorial dedicated to the 18th century Maratha military leader Mahadji Shinde who served as the commander-in-chief of the Maratha army under the Peshwas from 1760 to 1780. It is one of the most significant landmarks in the city and is reminiscent of the Maratha rule. It is a hall that marks the spot of Mahadji Shinde's cremation on 12 February 1794.

In 1794, the complex of the memorial only had a temple, dedicated to Lord Shiva, which was built by Mahadji Shinde himself. He died the same year and his last rites were performed in the premises. The memorial to Mahadji was commissioned by one of his descendants.

In 1910, a samadhi (memorial) was constructed outside the sanctum of the Shiva temple, in memory of Mahadji Shinde, exactly where he was cremated. Maharaja Madho Rao Scindia of Gwalior (1876 – 1925) commissioned the building of the complex, along with the memorial of Mahadji Shinde.The Architects of the monument were the firm of Shapurjee N. Chandabhoy of Bombay.

The Scindia of Gwalior are the descendants of Daulat Rao Sindhia, adopted son of Mahadji Shinde. It is maintained by Shinde Devasthan Trust, Gwalior.

== Architecturing at Shinde Chattri ==
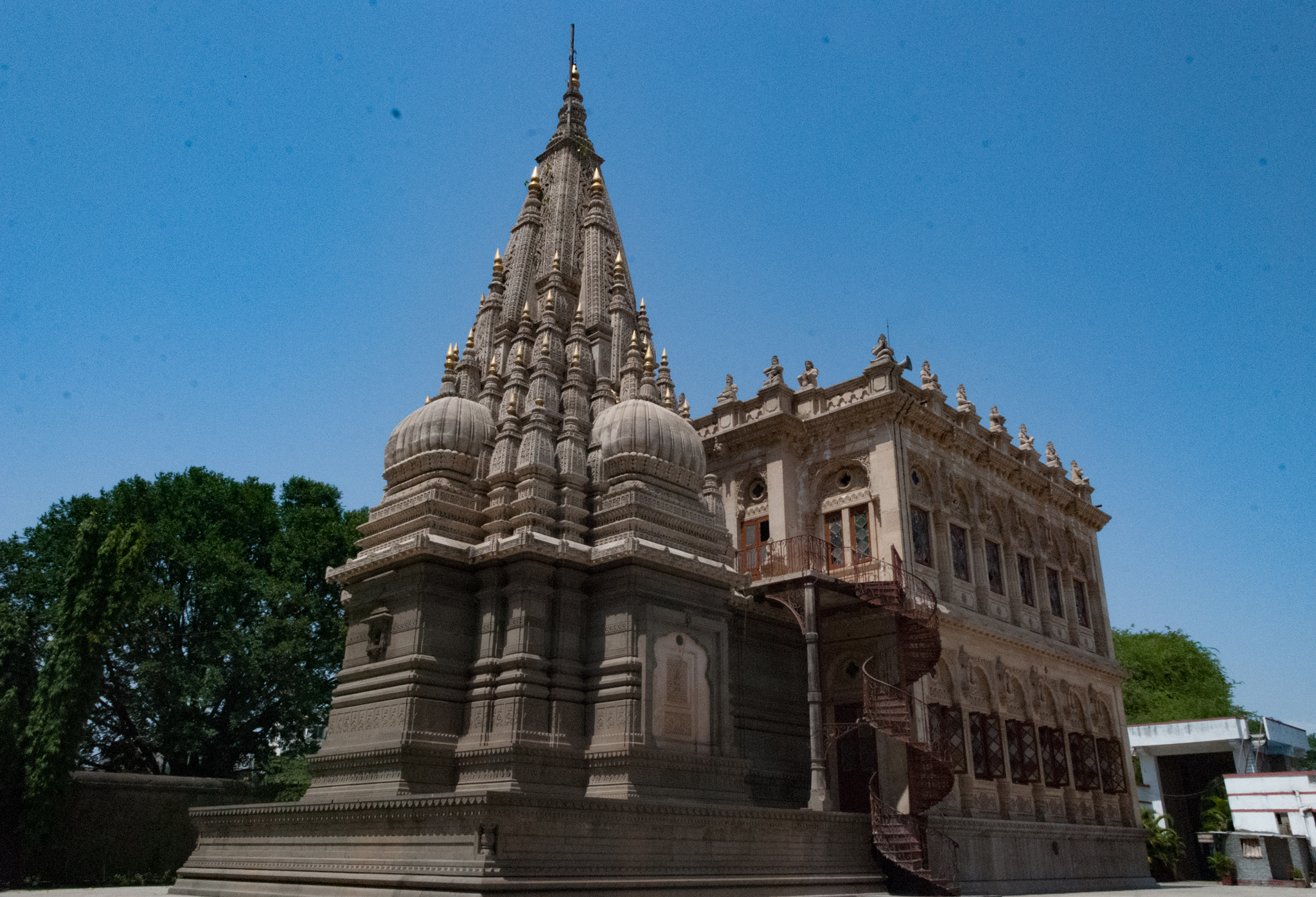
Shiva Temple at Shinde Chhatri (rear view)

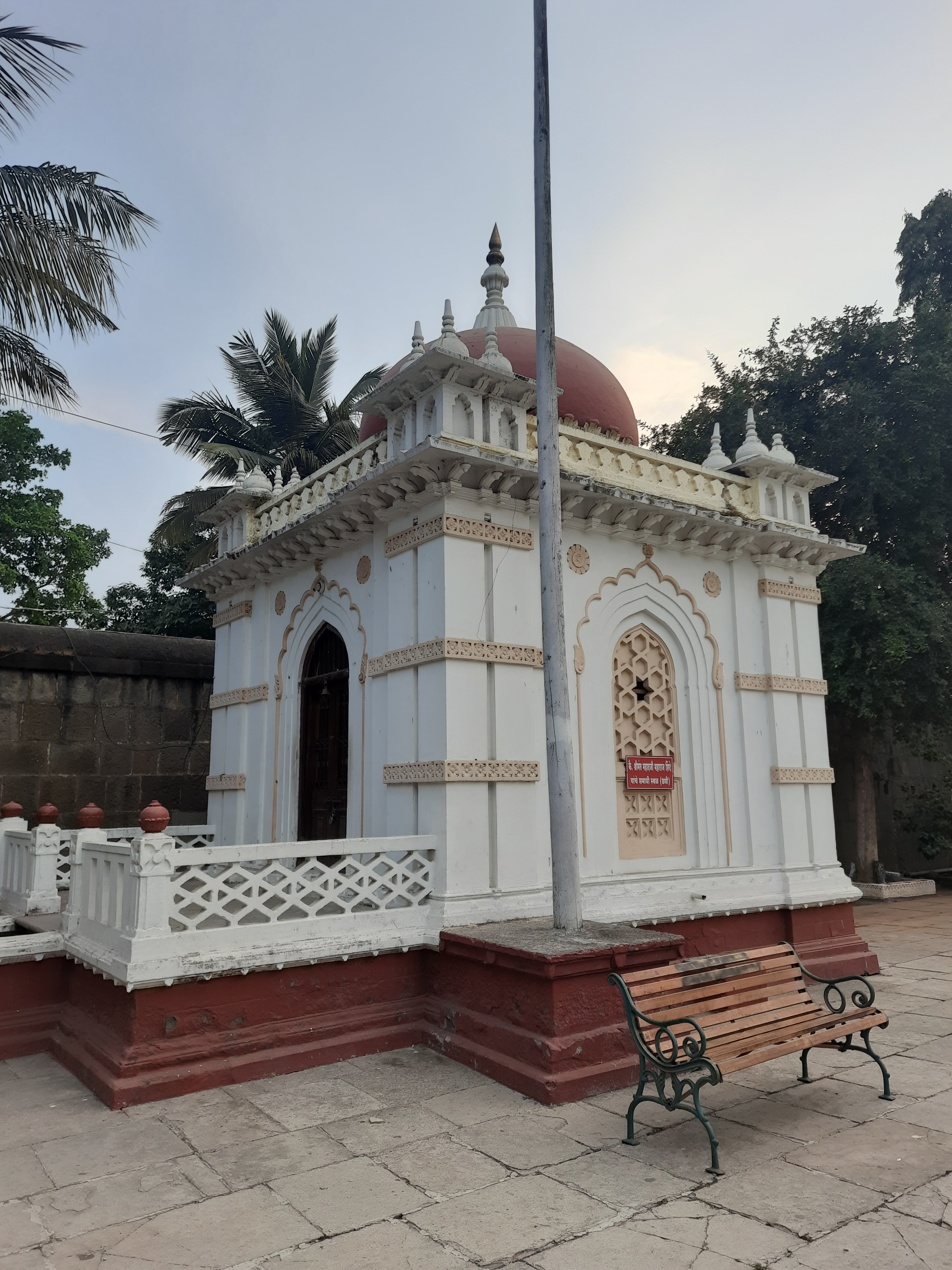
Samadhi of Mahadji Shinde at Shinde Chhatri, Pune

The major attraction of the Shinde Chhatri of Pune is its exquisite architecture, reflecting the style used in Rajasthan, India. The architectural grandeur of the building is appreciable with beautiful carvings and the building is the lively specimen of a structure constructed following the Vastu shastra rules. The memorial retains its architectural design and beauty till date.

The fine carvings and idols of saints on the steeple of the Shiva temple are made of yellow stone and the base and the sanctum sanctorum are constructed in black stone. The Chhatri (hall) not only has carvings and painting, but also houses a gallery in it. Coloured window-panes used for the windows are of English style. The hall is beautifully adorned with paintings and photographs of members of Shinde family.

== Renovations ==
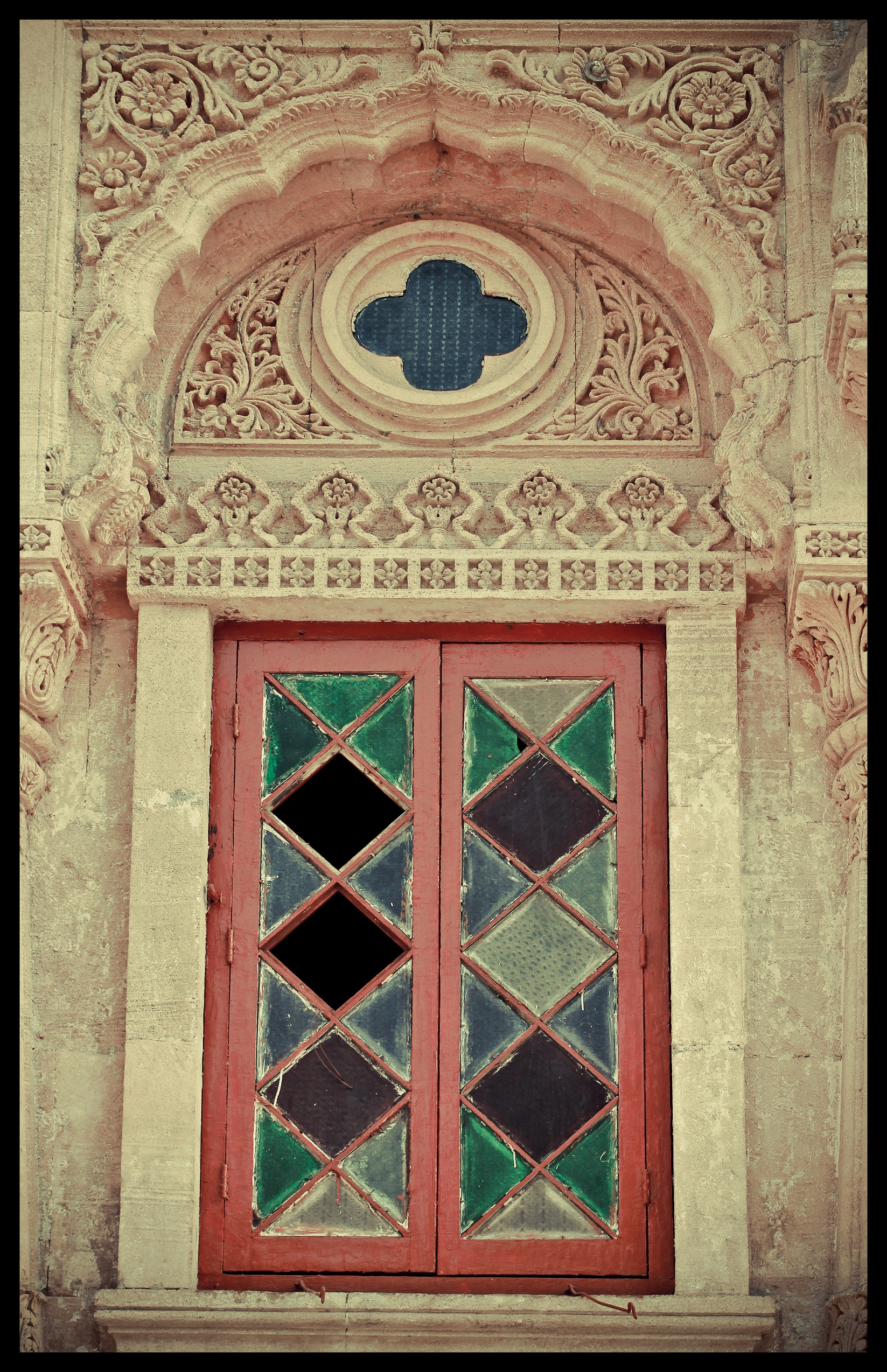
Renovated Window Detail at Shinde Chattri

Unfortunately, this memorial was overlooked for several years and was in a bad condition. The structure had gathered moss on the hall, due to the seepage of rain water. Rain and moisture had damaged the upper storey of the building, constructed in yellow stone, which had acquired a grayish look. The roof was also damaged, allowing the rain water to seep into the hall, damaging the carvings.

The beautiful structure is now getting restored to its original looks. The moss from the delicate and porous yellow stones was cleaned using pressure machines.

The building's supporting terrace is completely restored now. A water repellent roof was reconstructed to ensure that water does not seep inside, in future.

The first phase of the restoration is over.

In second phase, it has been planned to replace the old English styled window panes, with newer ones. Second phase will resume after the monsoon season.

== Future plans ==
There is also a tentative plan by the Shinde Devasthan Trust to come up with a small museum in the gallery of the hall at Shinde Chatri, after the restoration work is completed.

== Etiquette ==
Chhatri means umbrella in Marathi. As a sign of respect to the great warrior, visitors are required to close their umbrellas inside the premises, even if it is raining.
