= Battle of Chaksana =

1788 battle of the Mughal–Maratha Wars

Date	1788
Location	Chaksana
Result	Victory for Isma'il Beg.: Marathas retreat.

Belligerents
Maratha Confederacy	Mughal Empire

Commanders and leaders
Mahadaji Shinde	Isma'il Beg

Strength
Unknown	Unknown

Casualties and losses
Unknown	Unknown

The Battle of Chaksana was fought between the Mughal Empire and the Maratha Confederacy in 1788. The Marathas were led by the famous Maratha general Mahadaji Shinde and the Mughal forces were led by the general of the Mughal Army, Isma'il Beg. After a long and fierce battle, it ended with the Marathas eventually retreating.
