= Mahadaji Shinde =

Maharaja of Gwalior from 1768 to 1794

Mahadji Shinde
- Meherban Shrimant Sardar Shinde Bahadur; Naib Vakil-i-Mutlaq; Amir-ul-Umara; Maharajah of Gwalior; Hisam-us-Saltanat (Sword of The State)
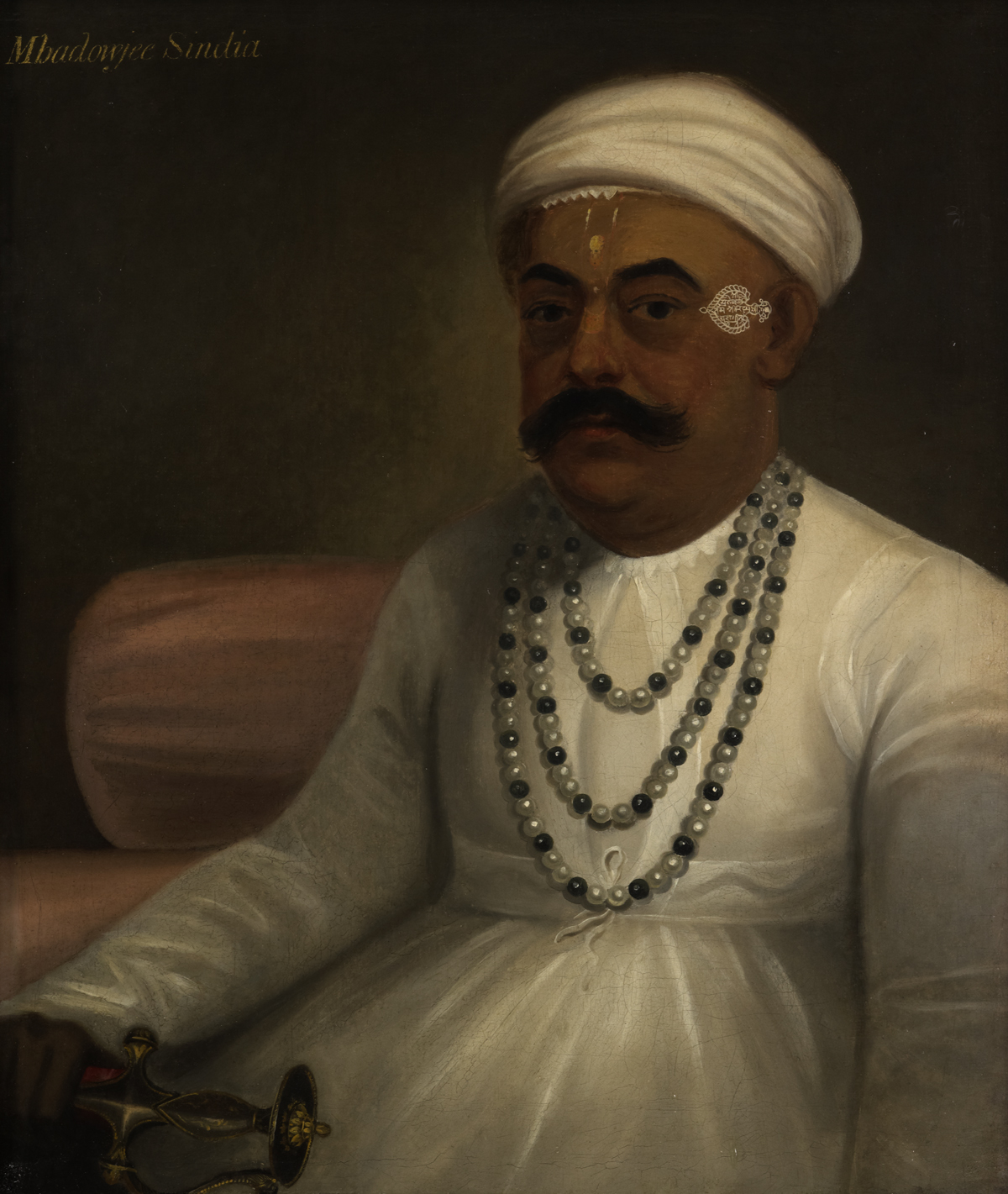
- Portrait by James Wales, c. 1792

6th Maharaja of Gwalior
- Reign: 18 January 1768 – 12 February 1794
- Coronation: 18 January 1768
- Predecessor: Manaji Rao Shinde
- Successor: Daulat Rao Shinde

Naib Vakil of the Mughal Empire
- Term: 1784–12 February 1794
- Emperor: Shah Alam II
- Predecessor: Madhavrao II
- Successor: Daulat Rao Shinde
- Born: 23 December 1730; Ujjain, Gwalior State, Maratha Confederacy (modern-day Madhya Pradesh, India)
- Died: 12 February 1794 (aged 63); Shinde Chhatri, Pune, Maratha Confederacy (modern-day Maharashtra, India)
- Spouse: Annapurnabai; Bhavanibai more...
- Issue: Bala Bai; Chimna Bai
Names
- Shrimant Madho (Madhoji) Rao Shinde
- House: Shinde
- Father: Ranoji Rao Shinde
- Mother: Chima Bai
- Religion: Hinduism
- Military career
- Branch: Maratha Army; Gwalior
- Rank: Sar-i-Naubat / Senapati; Sarnobat; Shiledar
- Units: Maratha Infantry; Maratha Cavalry; Maratha Artillery; Pindaris (irregular)
- Conflicts: See list: Nizam-Maratha Conflicts; Battle of Malthan; Afghan-Maratha War; Third Battle of Panipat; Capture of Delhi (1771); Maratha invasion of Rohilkhand; Capture of Delhi (1788); First Anglo-Maratha War; Battle of Wadgaon; Battle of Sironj; Gujrat campaign; Battle of Sipri; Maratha-Rajput Conflicts; Battle of Lalsot; Battle of Patan; Battle of Merta; Jat-Maratha Conflicts; Scindia-Holkar Rivalry; Battle of Lakheri
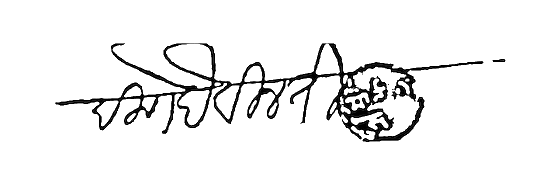
- Signature

Mahadaji Shinde (23 December 1730 – 13 February 1794), later known as Mahadji Scindia or Madhava Rao Scindia, was a Maratha statesman and general who served as the Maharaja of Gwalior from 1768 to 1794. He was the fifth and the youngest son of Ranoji Rao Scindia, the founder of the Scindia dynasty. He is reputed for having restored the Maratha rule over North India and for modernizing his army.

Mahadji was instrumental in resurrecting Maratha power in North India after the Third Battle of Panipat in 1761, and he rose to become a trusted lieutenant of the Peshwa, leader of the Maratha Confederacy. Along with Madhavrao I and Nana Fadnavis, he was one of the three pillars of Maratha Resurrection. He modernized his army under adventurers like Benoît de Boigne, which allowed Maratha dominance of North India. During his reign, Gwalior became the leading state in the Maratha Confederacy and one of the foremost military powers in India. After accompanying Shah Alam II to Delhi in 1771, he restored the Mughal Empire in Delhi and became the Naib Vakil-i-Mutlaq (Deputy Regent of the Empire).

Mahadji Shinde fought about 50 battles in his lifetime against various opponents. He defeated the Jats of Mathura and during 1772–73 Pathan Rohillas in Rohilkhand and captured Najibabad. His role during the First Anglo-Maratha War was greatest from the Maratha side since he defeated the British in the Battle of Wadgaon which resulted in the Treaty of Wadgaon and then again in Central India, singlehandedly, which resulted in the Treaty of Salbai in 1782, where he mediated between the Peshwa and the British. Mahadaji Shinde was also a scholar of Sanskrit.

== Relations with the Mughals ==
Shah Alam II spent six years in the Allahabad fort and after the capture of Delhi in 1771 by the Marathas, left for his capital under their protection. He was escorted to Delhi by Mahadaji Shinde and left Allahabad in May 1771. During their short stay, Marathas constructed two temples in the Allahabad city, one of them being the famous Alopi Devi Mandir. After reaching Delhi in January 1772 and realizing the Maratha intent of territorial encroachment, Shah Alam ordered his general Najaf Khan to drive them out. In retaliation, Tukoji Rao Holkar and Visaji Krushna Biniwale attacked Delhi and defeated Mughal forces in 1772.

The Marathas were granted an imperial sanad for Kora and Allahabad. They turned their attention to Oudh to gain these two territories. Shuja was however, unwilling to give them up and made appeals to the English and the Marathas did not fare well at the Battle of Ramghat. The Maratha and British armies fought in Ram Ghat, but the sudden demise of the Peshwa and the civil war in Pune to choose the next Peshwa forced the Marathas to retreat.

Mahadji Sindhia was deputed the Vakil-i-Mutlaq (Regent of the empire) of Mughal affairs in 1784.

R.S. Chaurasia says in regards to Mahadaji Shinde's relationship with Shah Alam II that though the Shah Alam II was in name the sovereign of India in practice he was a puppet overseen by Mahadaji Shinde. William Dalyrmple states that Sindhia had kept the imperial family starved and quotes a couplet of Shah alam II to Sindhia which states: "Having lost my kingdom and wealth, I am now in your hands, do as you wish"

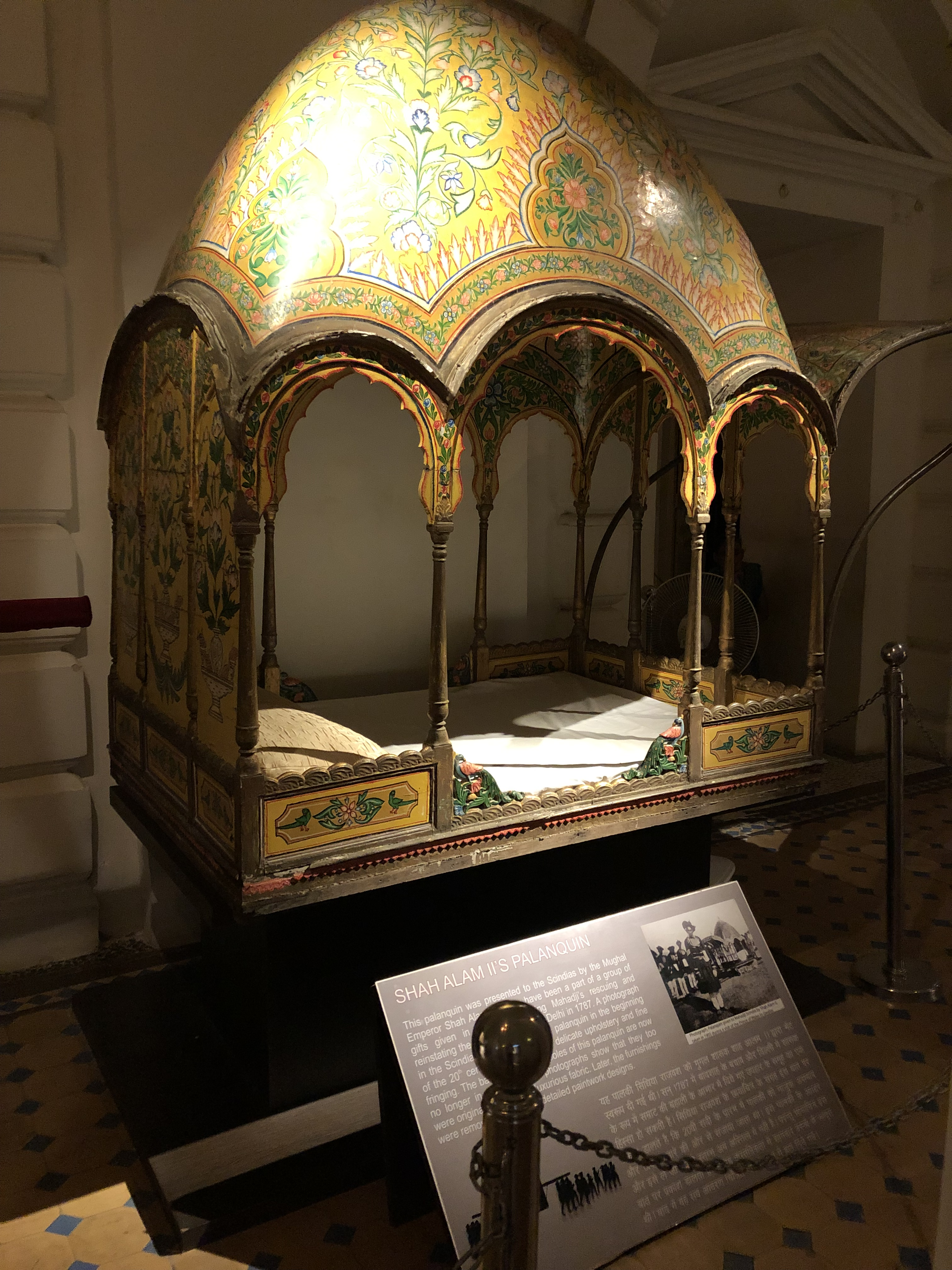
Planquin gifted to Shinde from Mughal Emperor Shah Alam II at Jai Vilas Palace Museum, Gwalior

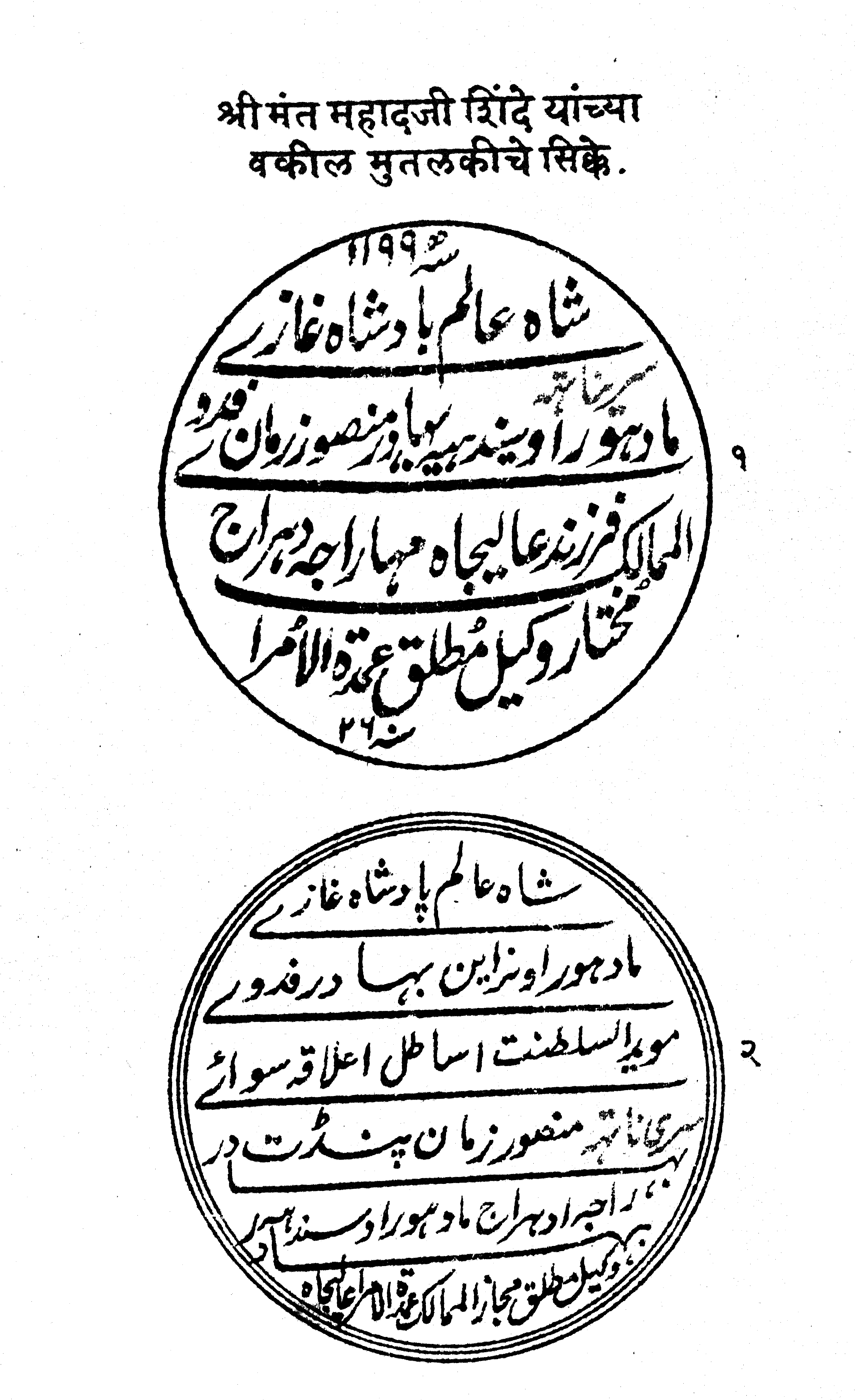
Seals authorizing Mahadji Shinde as Wakil-i-Mutalik of the Mughal Empire

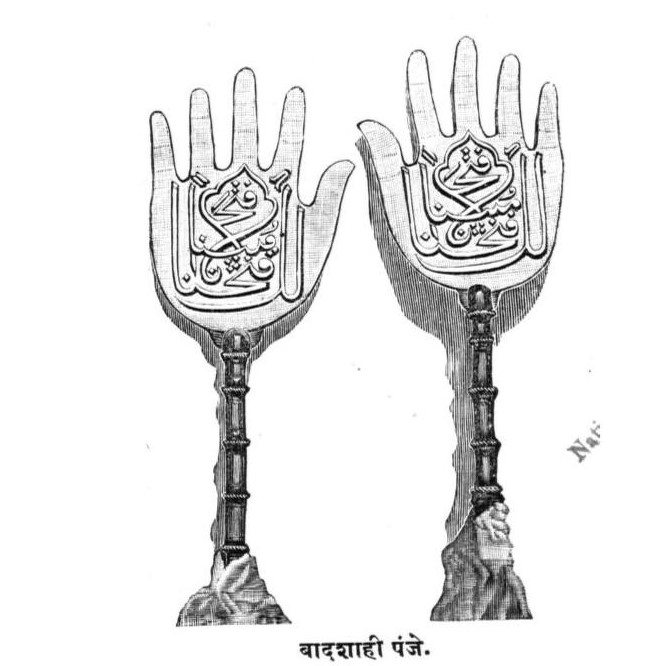
Badshahi Panjaa - Hand, a dignity conferred upon Mahadji Shinde by the Mughal Emperor

== Battles in Rohilkhand ==
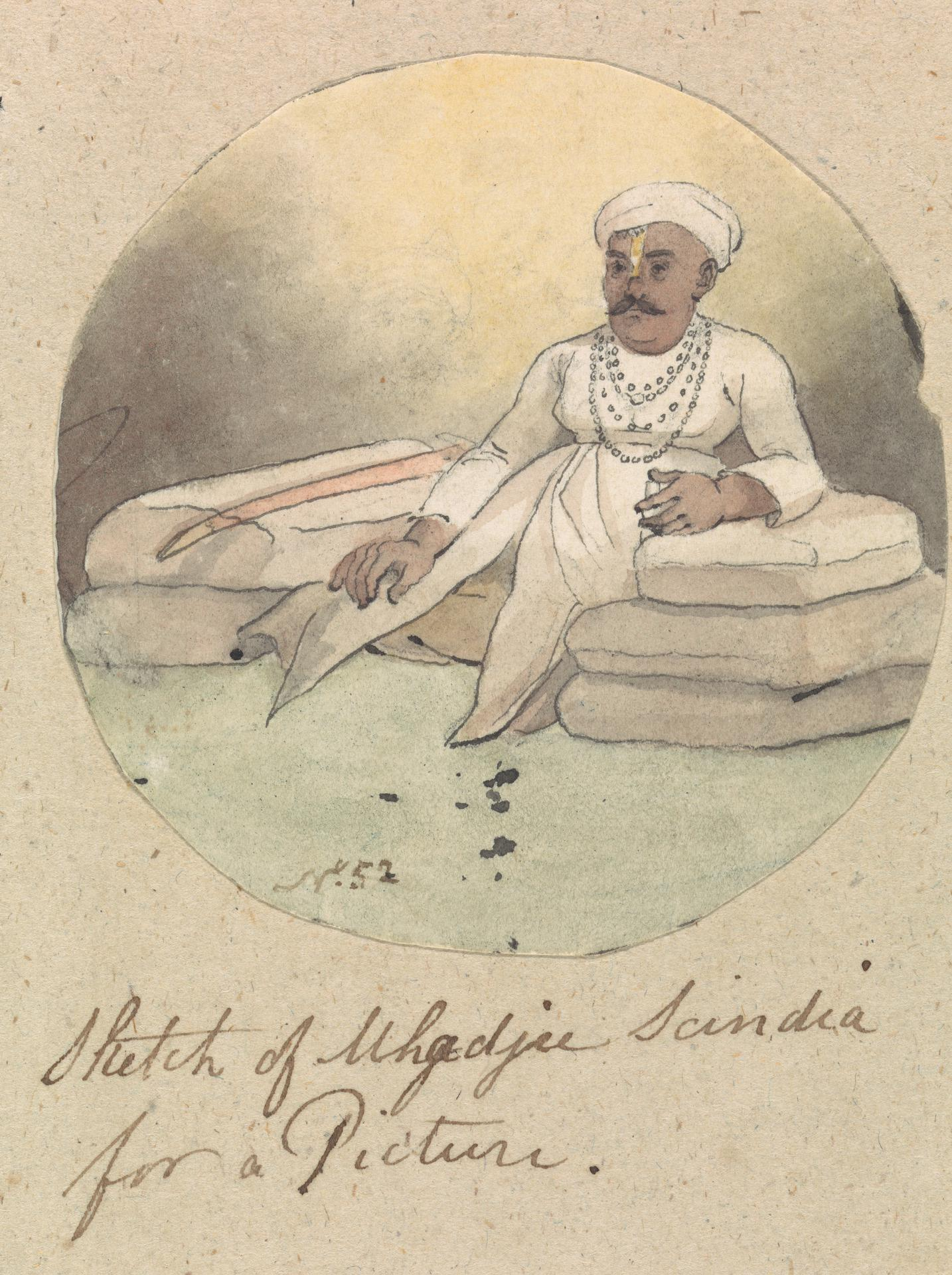
c. 1798 portrait of Shinde by Robert Mabon

The Marathas invaded Rohilkhand to retaliate against the Rohillas' participation in the Panipat war. The Marathas under the leadership of Mahadji Shinde entered the land of Sardar Najib-ud-Daula which was held by his son Zabita Khan after the sardar's death. Zabita Khan initially resisted the attack with Sayyid Khan and Saadat Khan behaving with gallantry, but was eventually defeated with the death of Saadat Khan by the Marathas and was forced to flee to the camp of Shuja-ud-Daula and his country was ravaged by Marathas.

Mahadji Shinde captured the family of Zabita Khan, desecrated the grave of Najib ad-Dawlah and looted his fort. With the fleeing of the Rohillas, the rest of the country was burnt, with the exception of the city of Amroha, which was defended by some thousands of Amrohi Sayyid tribes. The Rohillas who could offer no resistance fled to the Terai whence the remaining Sardar Hafiz Rahmat Khan Barech sought assistance in an agreement formed with the Nawab of Oudh, Shuja-ud-Daula, by which the Rohillas agreed to pay four million rupees in return for military help against the Marathas.

Hafiz Rehmat, abhoring unnecessary violence unlike the outlook of his fellow Rohillas such as Ali Muhammad and Najib Khan, prided himself on his role as a political mediator and sought the alliance with Awadh to keep the Marathas out of Rohilkhand. He bound himself to pay on behalf of the Rohillas. However, after he refused to pay, Oudh attacked the Rohillas.

== First Anglo Maratha War (1775–1782) ==
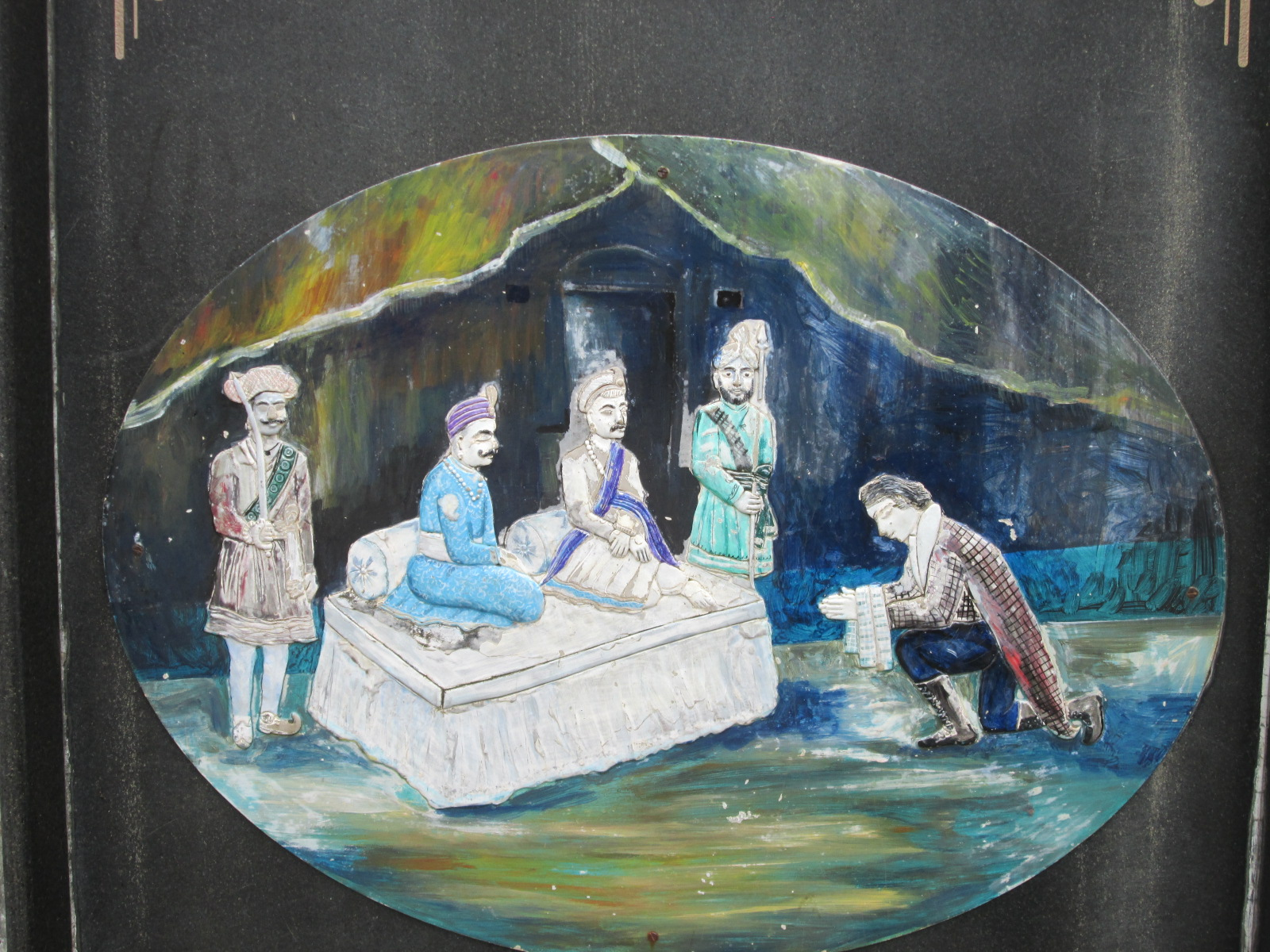
Mural depicting a British officer surrendering to Shinde and Nana Fadnavis following the Battle of Wadgaon

After the defeats of the British generals, Goddard and Murre in Konkan and Central India, respectively, Warren Hastings accepted a fresh treaty, known as the Treaty of Salbai, recognizing the terms of the Marathas, which were to recognize Sawai Madhavrao as the Peshwa and grant Raghunathrao a pension. The treaty also forced the British to evacuate and return to Shinde all his territories west of the Ganges. A resident, Mr. David Anderson (1750-1825), of St. Germains (who had negotiated the treaty) was at the same time appointed to Mahadji's court.

== Later years (1785–1792) ==
=== Relations with Sikhs ===
The Maratha-Sikh treaty in 1785 made the small Cis-Sutlej states, autonomous protectorate of the Scindia Dynasty and established Maratha influence once again in the Punjab region. All Sikh Sardars and Rajas paid tribute to Mahadji as he was deputed the Vakil-i-Mutlaq (Regent of the empire) of Mughal affairs in 1784.

=== Relations with Durrani Empire ===
Mahadaji Shinde's achievements impressed Timur Shah Durrani, ruler of Afghanistan. He sent peace proposals to Mahadaji Shinde offering the Marathas dominion up to Lahore and the Shah should have control beyond that territory. Both parties agreed to support one another during times of crisis, with the Afghan ruler committing to provide Sindia with 10,000 cavalry if needed. Although these assurances yielded no successful results, they underscored how Sindia’s steadfast courage and unyielding resolve had made the Marathas a powerful and respected force in North India Writes a contemporary: “Such moves are new and are the result of increased prestige of the Peshwa ”.

=== Revolt of Mughals under Ismail Beg ===
In 1788, Isma'il Beg, a Persian who served as a general in the Mughal army along with a few hundred Mughal-Rohilla troops led a large-scale revolt against the Marathas, who dominated North India at the time. The reason for this revolt is unknown but most suspect that he was trying to resurrect the Islamic glory in North India and depose the Hindu Marathas. However, the revolt was immediately crushed and Isma'il Beg was defeated and executed by the Scindian armies.

=== Defeat and execution of Ghulam Qadir ===
Thereafter, a Rohilla warlord named Ghulam Qadir, descendant of the infamously treacherous Najib-ud-Daualh and an ally of Isma'il Beg, captured Delhi, capital of the Mughals and deposed and blinded the Mughal emperor Shah Alam II, placing a puppet on the imperial throne. He unleashed untold atrocities on the royal family and common populace, slaughtering thousands and looting about 22 Crores. However on 2 October 1788, Mahadji Scindia, upon hearing this news, quickly re-assembled his army and captured Delhi, torturing and eventually killing Ghulam Qadir and restoring Shah Alam II to the throne.

=== Subjugation of Rajputana ===
In 1787, Mahadji attempted to invade Rajputana but he was repulsed by the Rajput armies at Lalsot. However, he regrouped his forces and in 1790, he avenged his defeat by crushing the Rajput kingdoms of Jodhpur and Jaipur in the battles of Patan and Merta, thereby reducing all major Rajput states to tributary status of the Marathas.

=== Other achievements ===
He worked with the English during the revolt of 1781 and played an important role in capturing Maharaja Chait Singh of Benares and crushing the revolt Another achievement of Mahadji was his victory over the Nizam of Hyderabad. After making peace with Tipu Sultan of Mysore in 1792, Mahadji is said to have exerted his influence to prevent the completion of an alliance between the British, the Nizam of Hyderabad, and the Peshwa against Tipu.

== Spouses ==
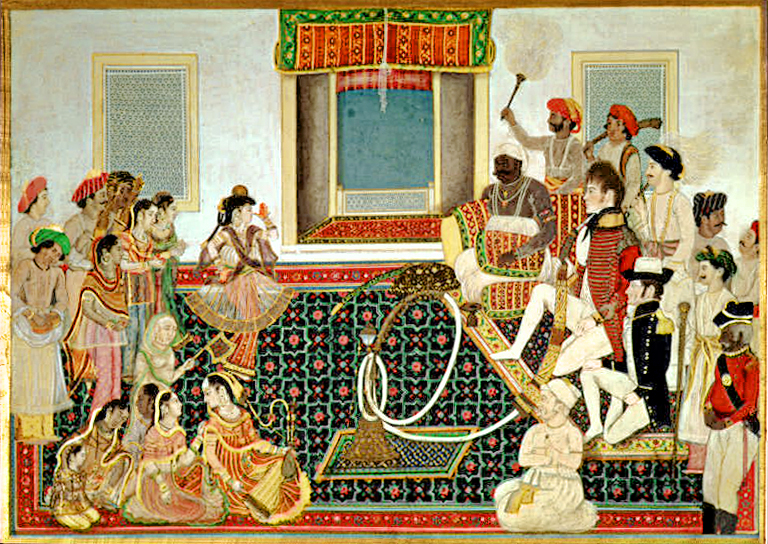
Mahadaji Scindia entertaining British officers with a nautch

Mahadji Shinde had a total of nine wives including:

- Annapurnabai (from Nimbalkar family of Beed)
- Bhavanibai (from Ghatge family)
- Parvatibai (Sister of Narsinghrao Ghatge)
- Bhavanibai (from Mhaske-Deshmukh family of Sangamner)
- Gangabai (from Palavekar family)
- Radhabai (from Padamsing Raul family)
- Bhagirathibai (from Khardekar family)
- Yamunabai (from Ramsing Raul family)
- Lakshmibai (from Bhope-Kadam family of Tuljapur, Osmanabad)

== Death and legacy ==
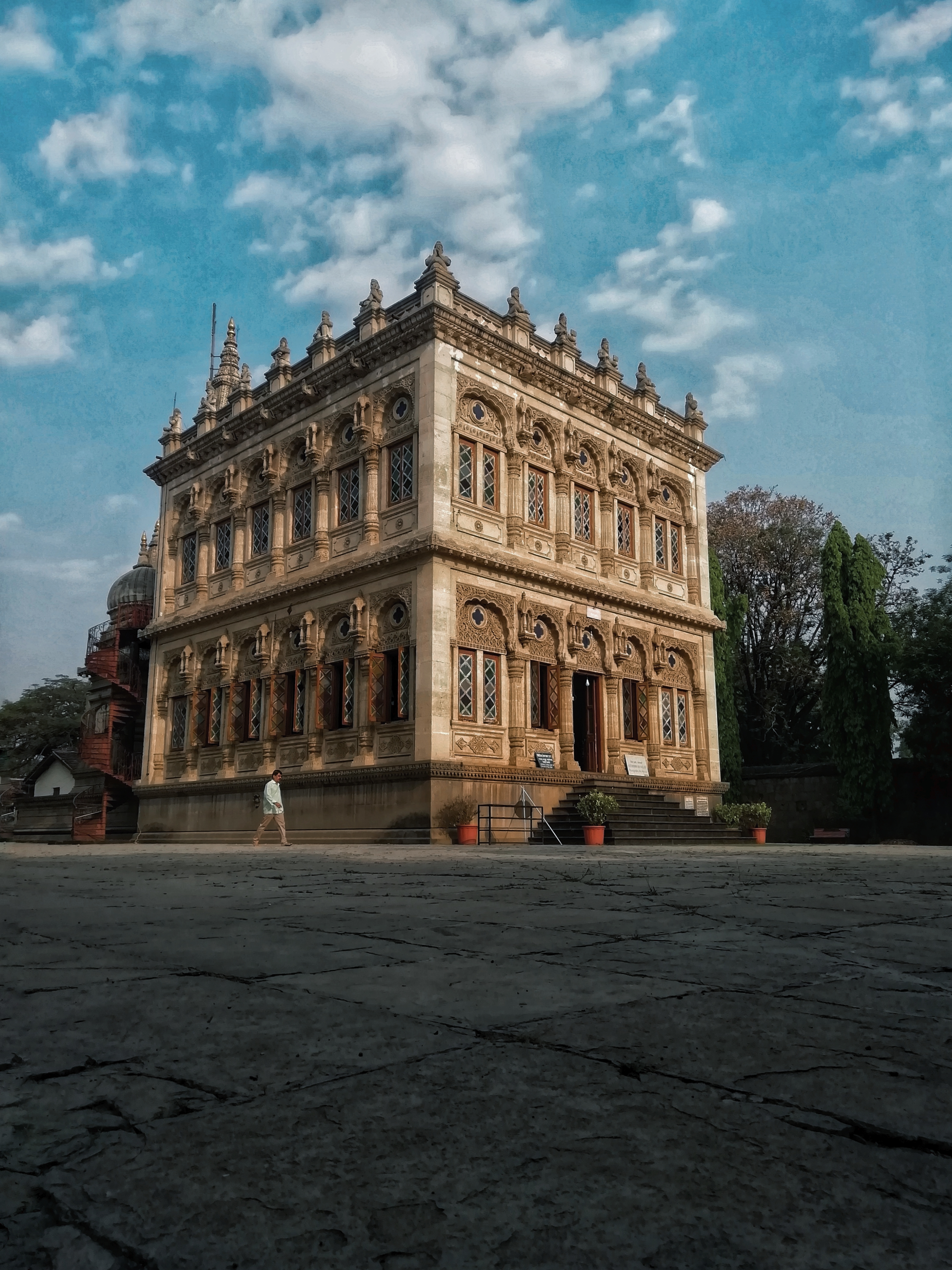
Shinde Chhatri, Wanawdi, Pune: A memorial dedicated to Mahadji Shinde

After the Battle of Lakheri, Mahadji was now at the zenith of his power, when he died, at his military camp at Wanawdi near Pune on 12 February 1794. He left no male heir, and was succeeded by Daulat Rao Scindia.

Keeney, the English biographer of Mahadaji Shinde, has described Mahadaji as the greatest man in India in the 18th century. Mahadaji Shinde's role was instrumental in establishing Maratha supremacy over North India.

Shinde Chhatri, located in Wanawadi, in Pune is a memorial dedicated to Mahadji Shinde. It is a hall that marks the spot of Mahadji Shinde's cremation on 12 February 1794. The three storied memorial in Rajput architectural style, is one of the most significant landmarks in the city.

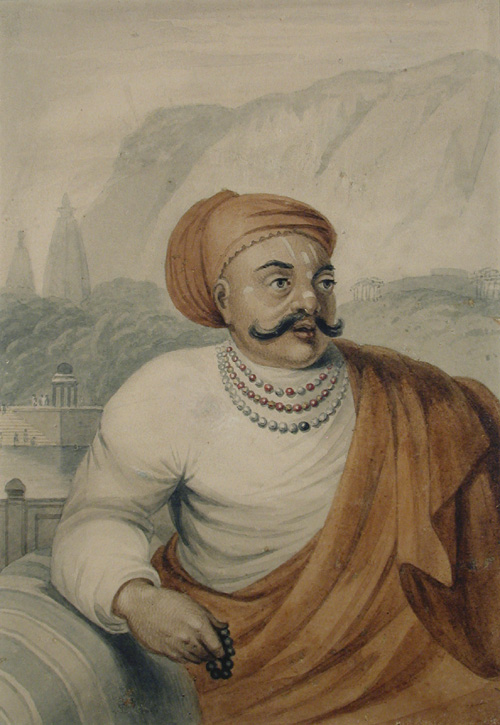
Portrait of Mahadaji Shinde by James Wales c.18th century

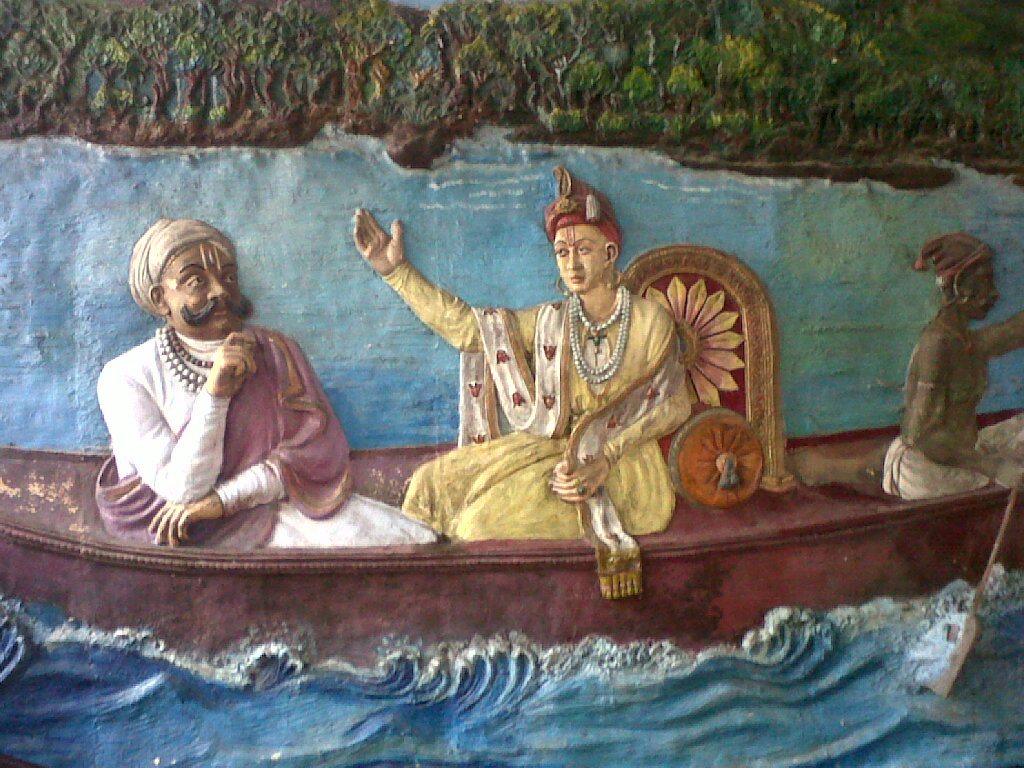
Mahadji Shinde with Peshwa Madhavrao II

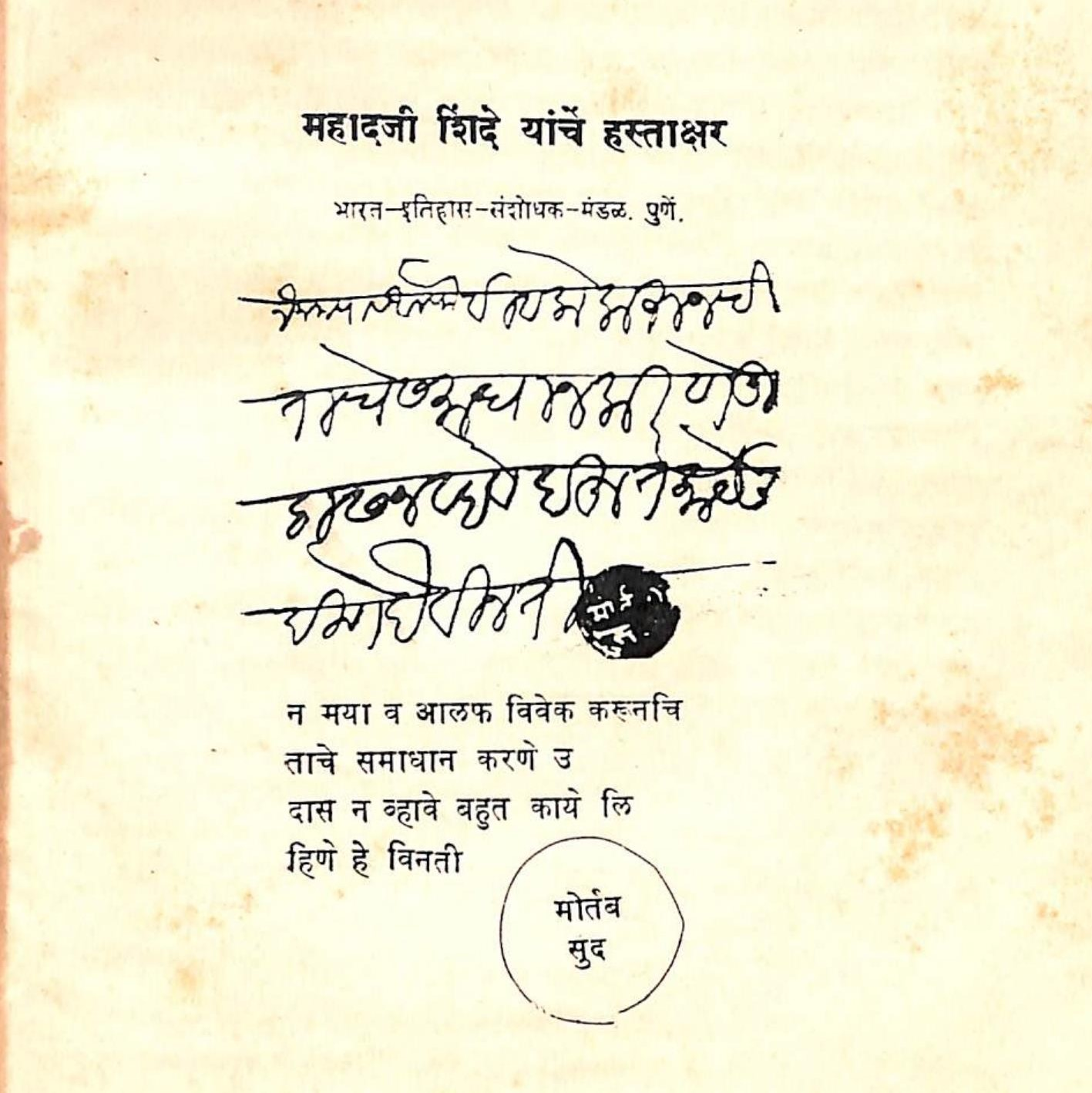
Handwriting of Mahadji Shinde

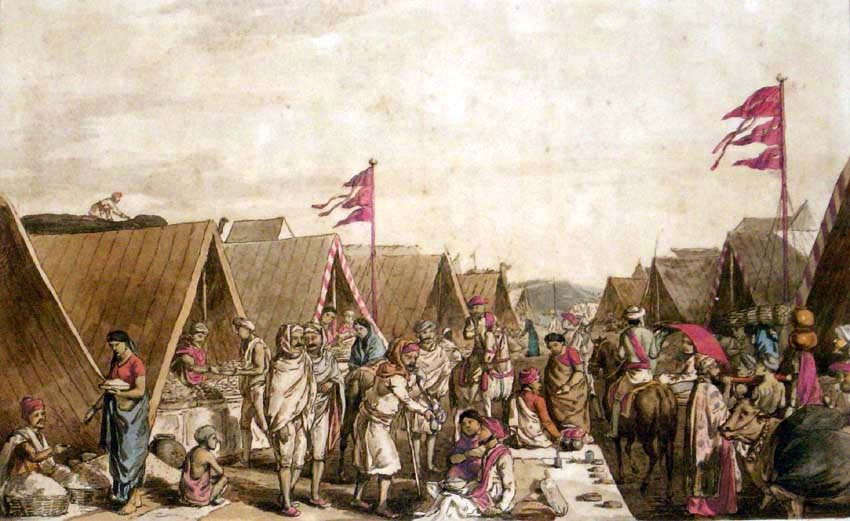
Army camp Built by Shinde painted in 1813 by John Augustus Atkinson

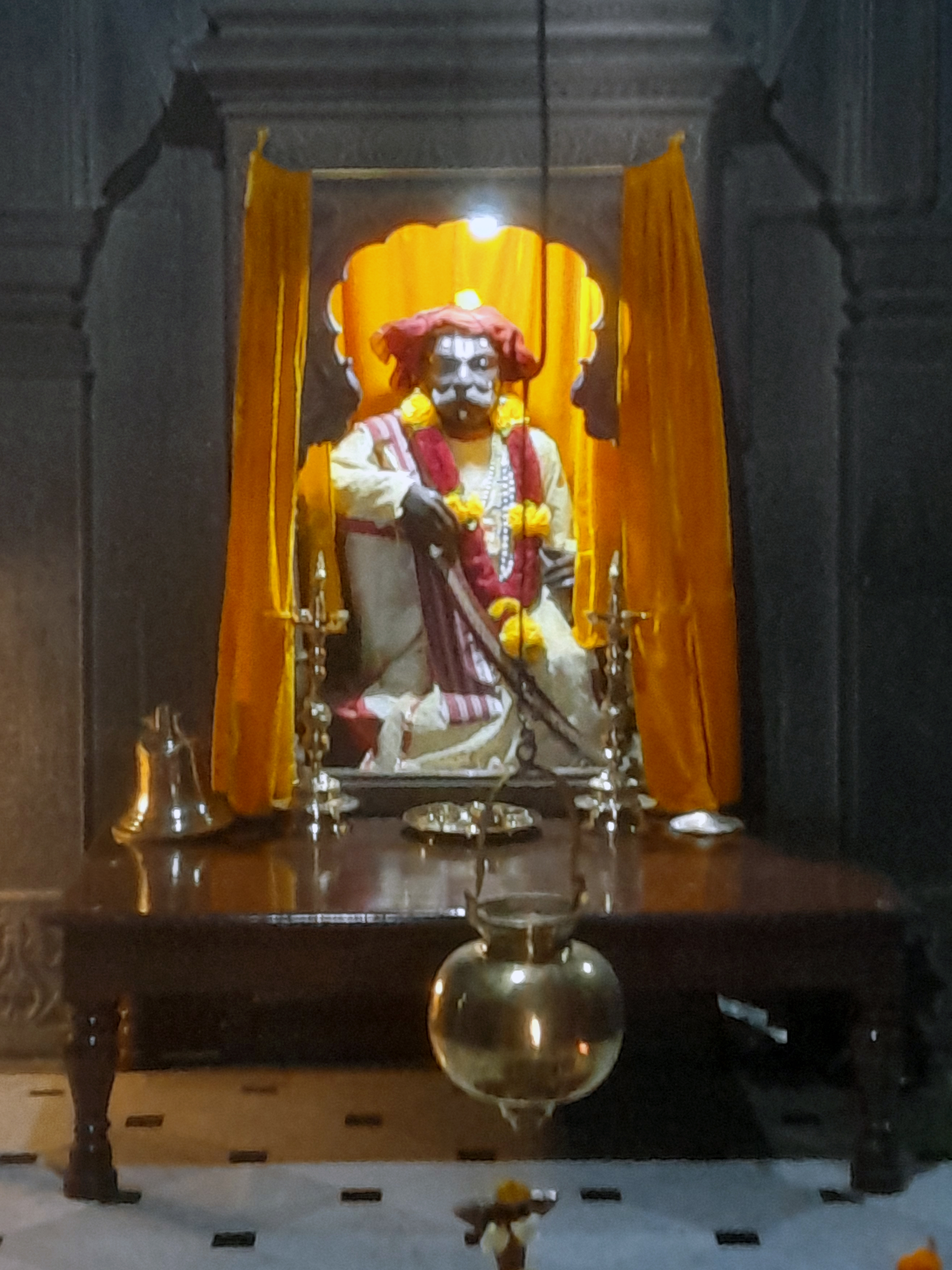
Statue of Mahadaji Shinde, inside the Shinde Chhatri

== In popular culture ==
- In 1988 Doordarshan Serial Bharat Ek Khoj produced and directed by Shyam Benegal also picturised an episode where the titular role of Mahadaji Shinde was played by noted TV actor Shreechand Makhija.
- In 1994, a TV series named The Great Maratha aired on DD National based on the life history of Mahadji Shinde. Shahbaz Khan portrayed the character of Mahadji Shinde in this serials TV-series.
- In the 2019 Bollywood film Panipat, based on the third battle of Panipat, where Mahadji was injured, his role was played by Sanjay Khapre.

== See also ==
- Mahadji Scindia Sports Complex

Mahadaji Shinde Scindia Dynasty
Regnal titles
Preceded by Ranoji Scindia	Maharaja of Gwalior; 1768–1794	Succeeded by Daulat Rao Scindia
