= Daulat Rao Sindhia =

Maharaja of Gwalior from 1794 to 1827

Daulat Rao Scindia
- Maharaja of Gwalior, Naib Vakil-i-Mutlaq (Deputy Regent of the Hindostan Empire), Amir-al-Umara (Head of the Amirs), The Defender of Delhi
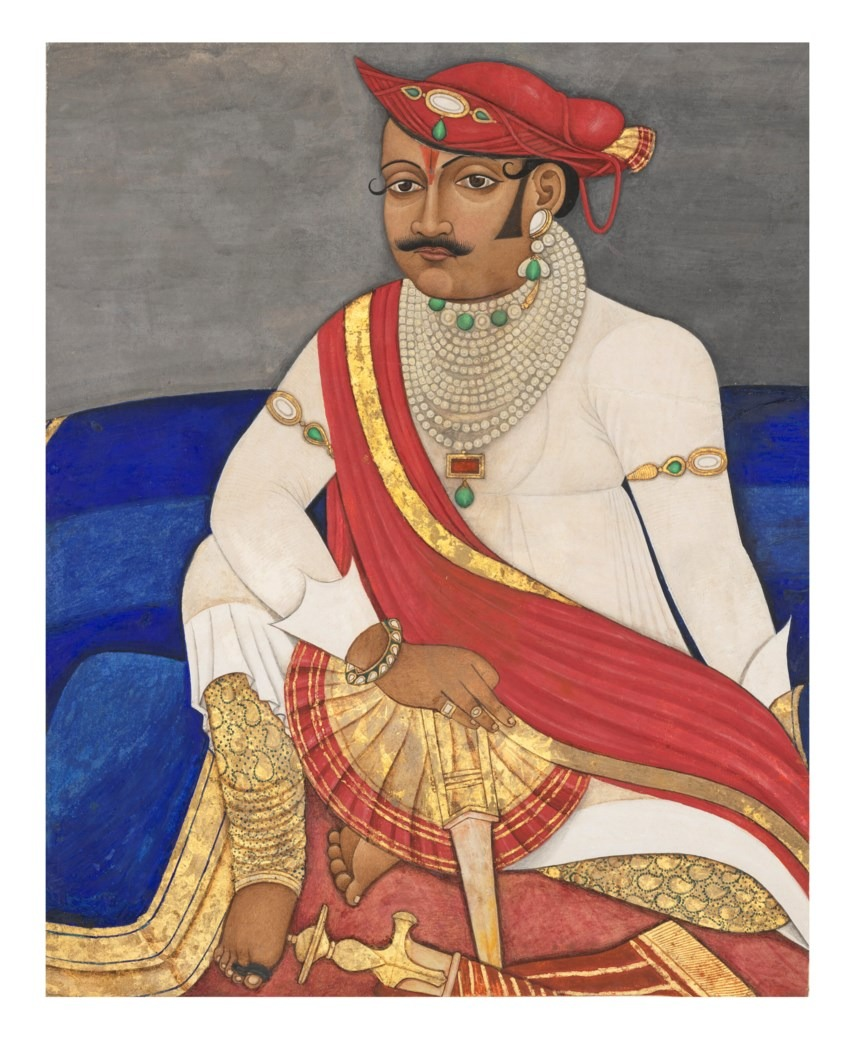
- Shrimant Daulat Rao Scindia

3rd Maharaja Scindia of Gwalior
- Reign: 12 February 1794 – 21 March 1827
- Predecessor: Mahadaji Scindia
- Successor: Jankoji Rao Scindia II

Naib Vakil of the Mughal Empire
- Term: 12 February 1794 – 9 April 1818
- Emperor: Shah Alam II; Akbar II
- Predecessor: Mahadaji Scindia
- Successor: Position disestablished
- Born: 1779; Gwalior
- Died: 21 March 1827 (aged 48); Gwalior, Scindia state of Gwalior
- Spouse: Baiza Bai (m. 1798)
- House: Scindia
- Father: Anand Rao Scindia
- Mother: Mainabai Scindia (née Angre)
- Religion: Hinduism
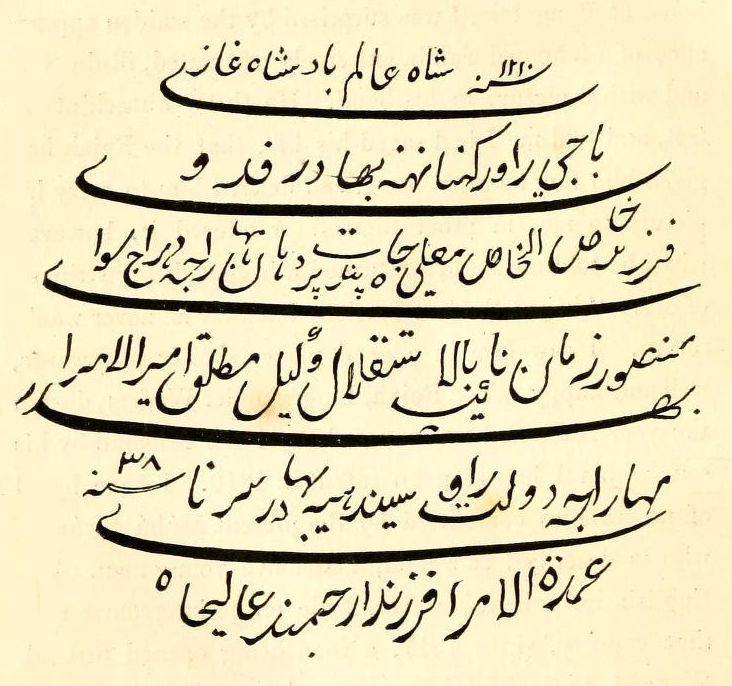
- Seal

Daulat Rao Scindia (1779 – 21 March 1827) also conferred with the title "The defender of Delhi" was the Maratha Maharaja of Gwalior state in central India from 1794 until his death in 1827. His reign coincided with struggles for supremacy within the Maratha Empire, and wars with the expanding East India Company. Daulatrao played a significant role in the Second Anglo-Maratha War and Third Anglo-Maratha War. While most Indian rulers had accepted British rule, Scindia's kingdom maintained its independence even as late as 1832 and continued collecting Chauth (taxes) from other neighbouring states (including the Mughals) and dependent Kingdoms till 1886. As per an answer given by Mill in a Parliamentary Committee in Britain on February 16, 1832, on the status of Scindia's kingdom it was mentioned that "he was independent". This committee finally reported to Parliament that "within the Peninsula, Sindhia is the only prince who preserves the semblance of independence".

Mahadji Scindia left a huge empire to his successor Daulatrao Scindia as per Malcolm he inherited "a greater, if not more consolidated power than any Indian Prince had attained since the days of Aurangzeb".

== Wars and military conflicts ==
- Battle of Malpura
- Battle of Assaye
- Battle of Argaon
- Second Anglo-Maratha War
- Third Anglo-Maratha War

== Ascent of Scindias ==
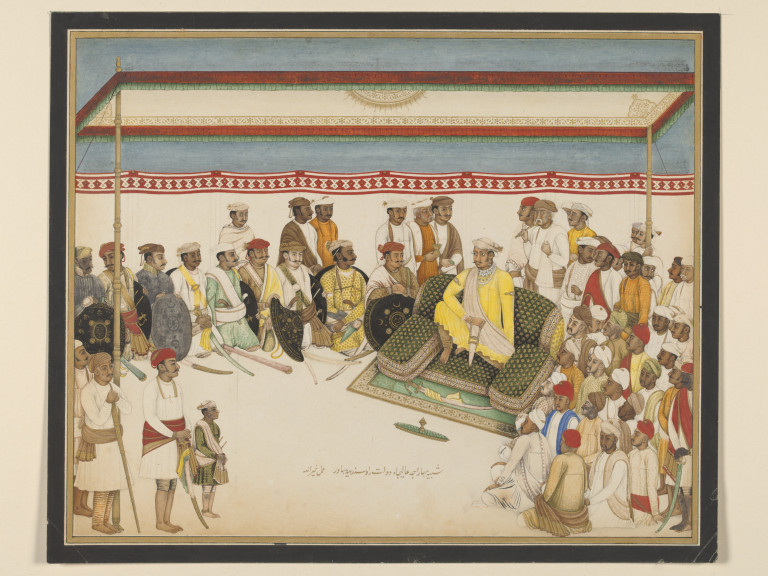
Durbar of Daulat Rao Scindia.

Daulatrao was a member of the Sindhia dynasty and ascended to the Gwalior throne on 12 February 1794 at the age of 15, upon the death of Maharaja Mahadji Scindia, who left no heir. Daulatrao was a grandson of Mahadji's elder brother Tukoji Rao Scindia, who was killed in the Third Battle of Panipat, 7 January 1761. Daulatrao was recognised and formally installed by the Satara Chhatrapati (Emperor) and Peshwa on 3 March 1794 and was conferred the titles of Naib Vakil-i-Mutlaq (Deputy Regent of the Empire), Amir-al-Umara (Head of the Amirs) from Shah Alam II on 10 May 1794.

Gwalior state was part of the Maratha Empire, which was founded by Shivaji in the 17th century. De facto control of the empire passed from Shivaji's successors to the hereditary prime ministers of the Empire, entitled peshwas and the empire expanded greatly in the 18th century at the expense of the Mughal Empire. As the empire expanded, commanders of the Maratha armies were given authority to collect chauth (tribute) in the conquered territories on behalf of the Peshwa. Daulatrao's ancestor Ranoji Sindhia had conquered territories in the Malwa and Gird regions from the Mughals, eventually establishing a state which was initially based at Ujjain, but was named after the strategic fortress of Gwalior. His wife Baiza Bai was a powerful and an intelligent lady of her time. She played an important role in the affairs of the Gwalior state.

The Maratha defeat at the Third Battle of Panipat checked the Maratha expansion towards the Northwest, and hastened the decentralization of power in the empire to a 'pentarchy' made up of the five most powerful Maratha dynasties: the Peshwas of Pune, the Sindhias of Gwalior, the Holkars of Indore, the Pawars of Dhar and Dewas, the Bhonsles of Nagpur and the Gaekwads of Baroda.

Daulatrao's predecessor Mahadji Scindia had, in the aftermath of Panipat, turned Gwalior into a chief military power of the empire, developing a well-trained modern army under the command of Benoît de Boigne. Daulatrao therefore looked upon himself less as a member of the Maratha Empire and more as the chief sovereign in India.

== Scindia-Holkar confrontation ==
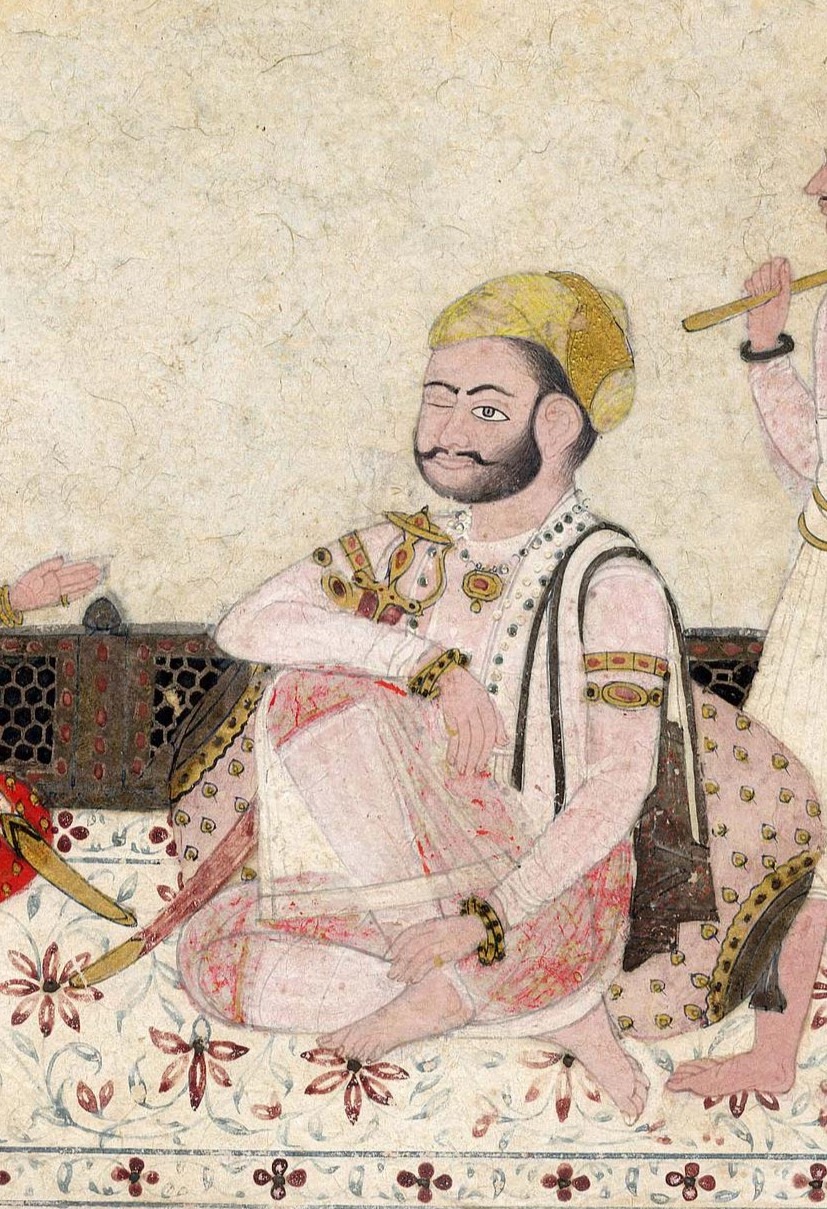
Yashwant Rao Holkar

At this time the death of the young Peshwa, Madhavrao II (1795), and the troubles which it occasioned, the demise of Tukojirao Holkar and the rise of the turbulent Yashwantrao Holkar, together with the intrigues of Nana Farnavis, threw the confederacy into confusion and enabled Sindhia to gain the ascendancy. He also came under the influence of Sarjerao Ghatge, a dubious character from Maratha point of view, whose daughter he had married (1798). Urged possibly by this adviser, Daulatrao aimed at increasing his dominions at all costs, and seized territory from the Maratha Ponwars of Dhar and Dewas. The rising power of Yashwantrao Holkar of Indore, however, alarmed him. In July 1801, Yashwantrao appeared before Sindhia's capital of Ujjain, and after defeating some battalions under John Hessing, extorted a large sum from its inhabitants, but did not ravage the town. In October, however, Sarjerao Ghatge took revenge by sacking Indore, razing it almost to the ground, and practicing every form of atrocity on its inhabitants.

Then, in 1802, on the festival of Diwali, Yashwantrao Holkar defeated the combined armies of Scindia and Peshwa Bajirao II at Hadapsar, near Pune. The battle took place at Ghorpadi, Banwadi, and Hadapsar. From this time dates the gardi-ka-wakt, or 'period of unrest', as it is still called, during which the whole of central India was overrun by the armies of Sindhia and Holkar and their attendant predatory Pindari bands, under Amir Khan and others. Benoît de Boigne had retired as commander of Gwalior's army in 1796; and his successor, Pierre Cuillier-Perron, was a man of a very different stamp, whose determined favouritism of French officers, in defiance of all claims to promotion, produced discontent in the regular corps.

== Scindia-British treaty ==
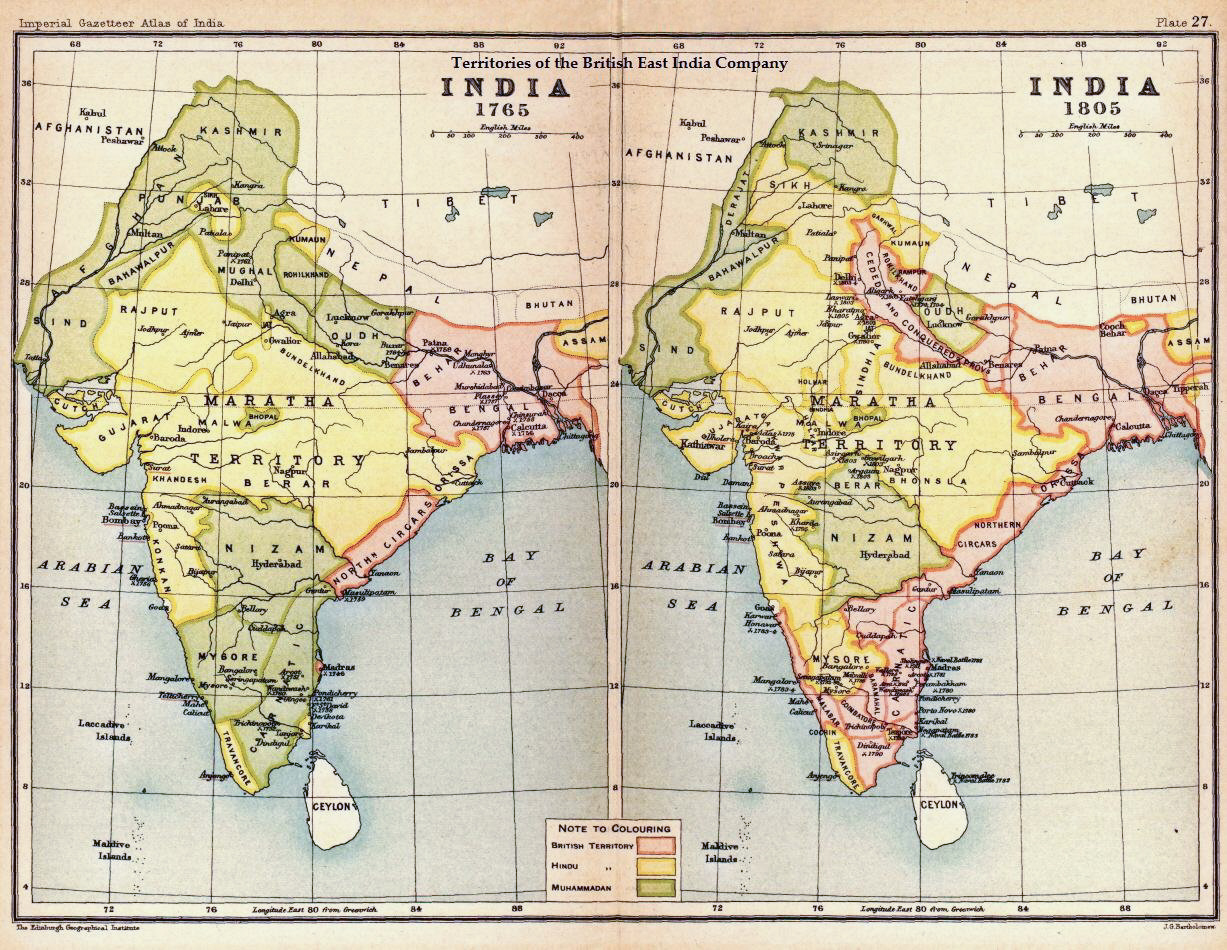
India in 1765 (left) and 1805 (right).

Finally, on 31 December 1802, the Peshwa signed the Treaty of Bassein, by which the East India Company was recognized as the paramount power in India. The continual evasion shown by Sindhia in all attempts at negotiation brought him into conflict with the British, and his power in both western and northern India was brought down by major defeats at Ahmadnagar, Assaye, Argaon, Asirgarh and Laswari. On 30 December 1803, he signed the Treaty of Surji Anjangaon, by which he was obliged to give up his possessions between the Yamuna and the Ganges, South Haryana, the district of Bharuch, and other lands in the south of his dominions; and soon after, by the Treaty of Burhanpur, he agreed to maintain a subsidiary force to be paid for out of the revenues of territory ceded by the treaty. By the ninth article of the Treaty of Surji Anjangaon he was deprived of the fortresses of Gwalior and Gohad, The discontent produced by the last condition almost caused a rupture, and did actually result in the plundering of the Resident's camp and detention of the Resident as a prisoner.

In 1805, under the new policy of Lord Cornwallis, Gohad and Gwalior were restored, and the Chambal River was made the northern boundary of the state, while certain claims on Rajput states were abolished, the Company administration at the same time binding itself to enter into no treaties with Udaipur, Jodhpur, Kotah, or any chief tributary to Sindhia in Malwa, Mewar, or Marwar.

In 1811, Shrimant Daulat Rao conquered the neighboring kingdom of Chanderi. In 1816 Sindhia was called on to assist in the suppression of the Pindaris. For some time it was doubtful what line he would take, but he ultimately signed the Treaty of Gwalior in 1817 by which he promised full cooperation. He did not, however, act up to his professions, and connived at the retention of the fort of Asirgarh, which had been ceded by the treaty. A fresh treaty in 1818 effected a readjustment of boundaries, Ajmer and other lands being ceded.

Daulat Rao Sindhia Scindia Dynasty Born: 1779 Died: 21 March 1827
Regnal titles
Preceded by Mahadaji Scindia	Maharaja of Gwalior; 1794–1827	Succeeded by Jankoji Rao Scindia II
