= Vakil-i-Mutlaq =

Exalted office in Mughal administration

Vakil of the Mughal Empire
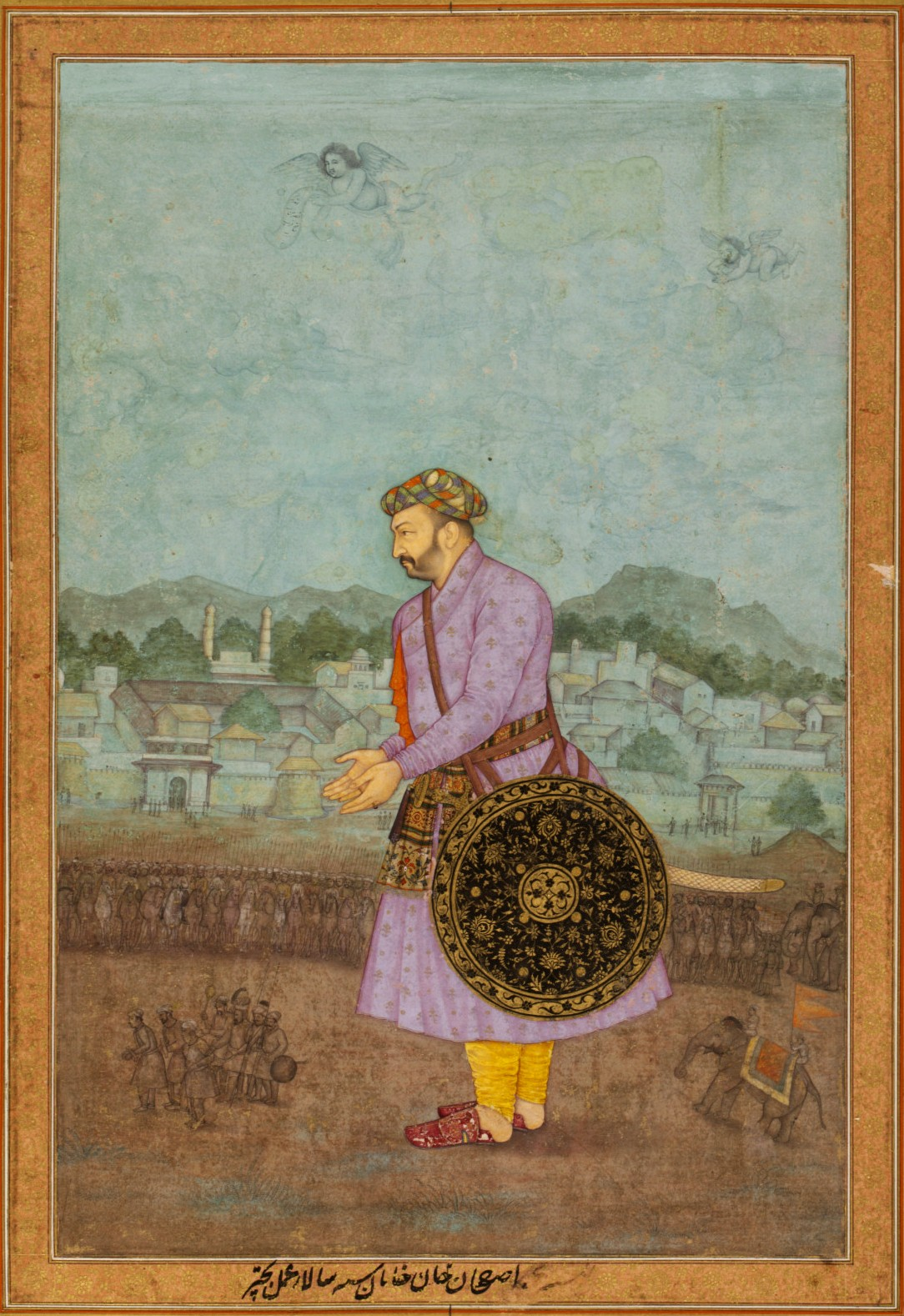
- Abu'l-Hasan Asaf Khan
- Style: His Excellency
- Residence: House of Rule
- Appointer: The Emperor
- Formation: 21 April 1526
- First holder: Mir Khalifa
- Final holder: Daulat Rao Sindhia
- Abolished: 9 April 1818

The Vakil-i-Mutlaq (Persian: وکیلِ مطلق), variously translated as the Lieutenant Plenipotentiary, the Regent Plenipotentiary, the Vicegerent or the Imperial Regent, was an important office in the Government of the Mughal Empire, first in ministerial hierarchy and only next to Mughal Emperor. Vekil is an Arabic word which means "representative". The Vakil was considered as the Emperor's lieutenant in all matters connected with the realm and household. From the reign of Emperor Babur to Emperor Shah Jahan, the title of grand vizier was also given to the Vakil. But afterwards it remained only as dignitary post.

The degree of powers of the Vakil's office varied from era to era. However the Vakil required Emperor's approval in each and every decision. During the era of Babur and Humayun, he had the powers of prime minister while early in the reign of Akbar, Vakil Bairam Khan acted as regent and ruled on the behalf of Emperor. Bairam Khan had his own Vakil-i-Mutlaq, who in this case was a general manager. This position was held by Pir Muhammad Khan Shirwani and when he was temporarily dismissed, given to Haji Muhammad Sistani. In 1564, Akbar revived the office of Vakil and didn't give him the responsibilities of finance department. In the reign of Jahangir, the office of Imperial Diwan gained prominence and ultimately during Shah Jahan's regime, the title of grand vizier was transferred from Vakil's office to Imperial Diwan.

== See also ==
- Government of the Mughal Empire
- List of Mughal grand viziers
- Vakil Munim Khan, successor of Bairam Khan
