= List of Marathi people =

This is a list of notable Marathi people an ethnolinguistic group that speaks Marathi, an Indo-Aryan language as their native language.

== Dynasties ==
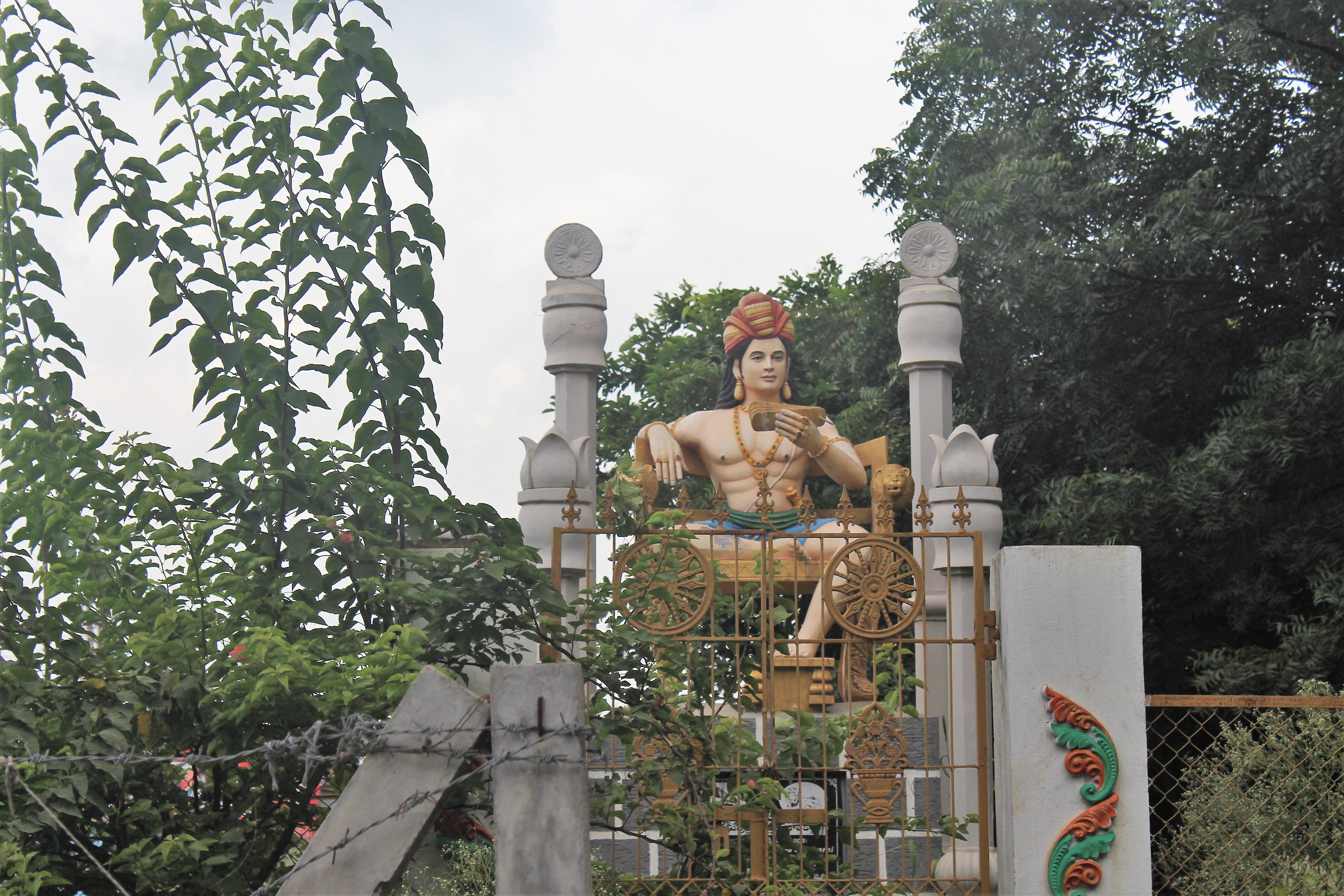
Gautamiputra Satakarni

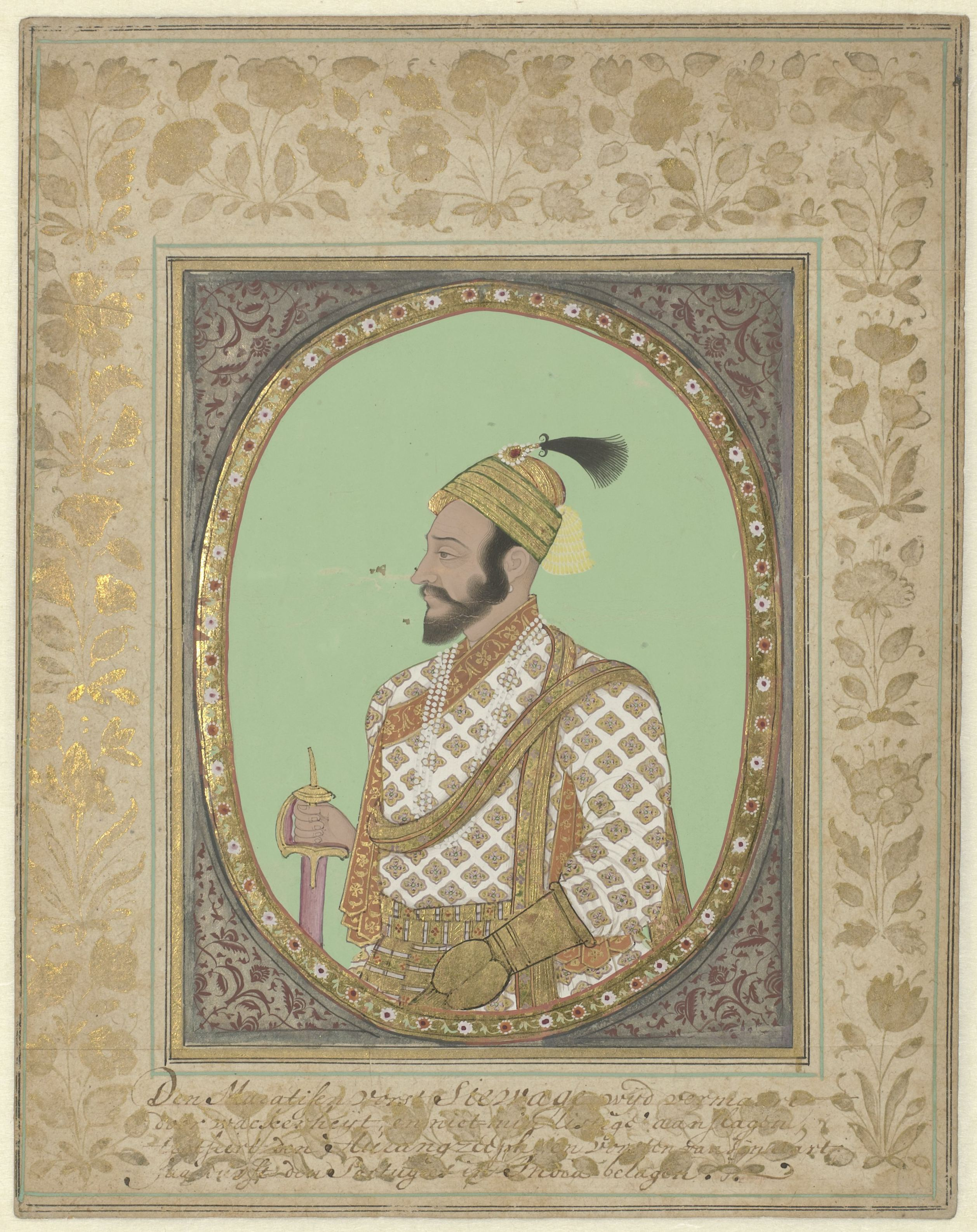
Chhatrapati Shivaji Maharaj

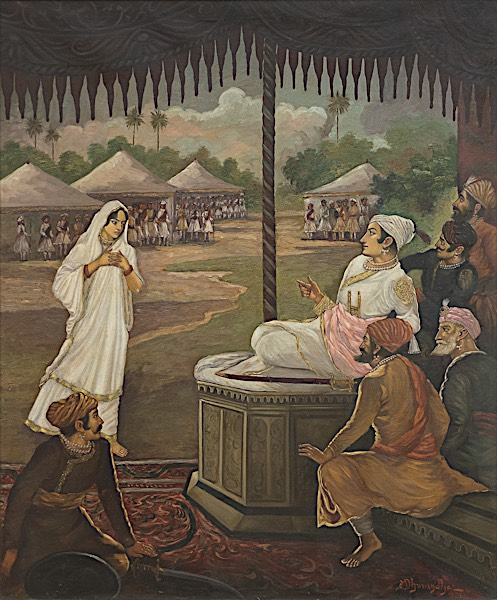
Chhatrapati Sambhaji Maharaj

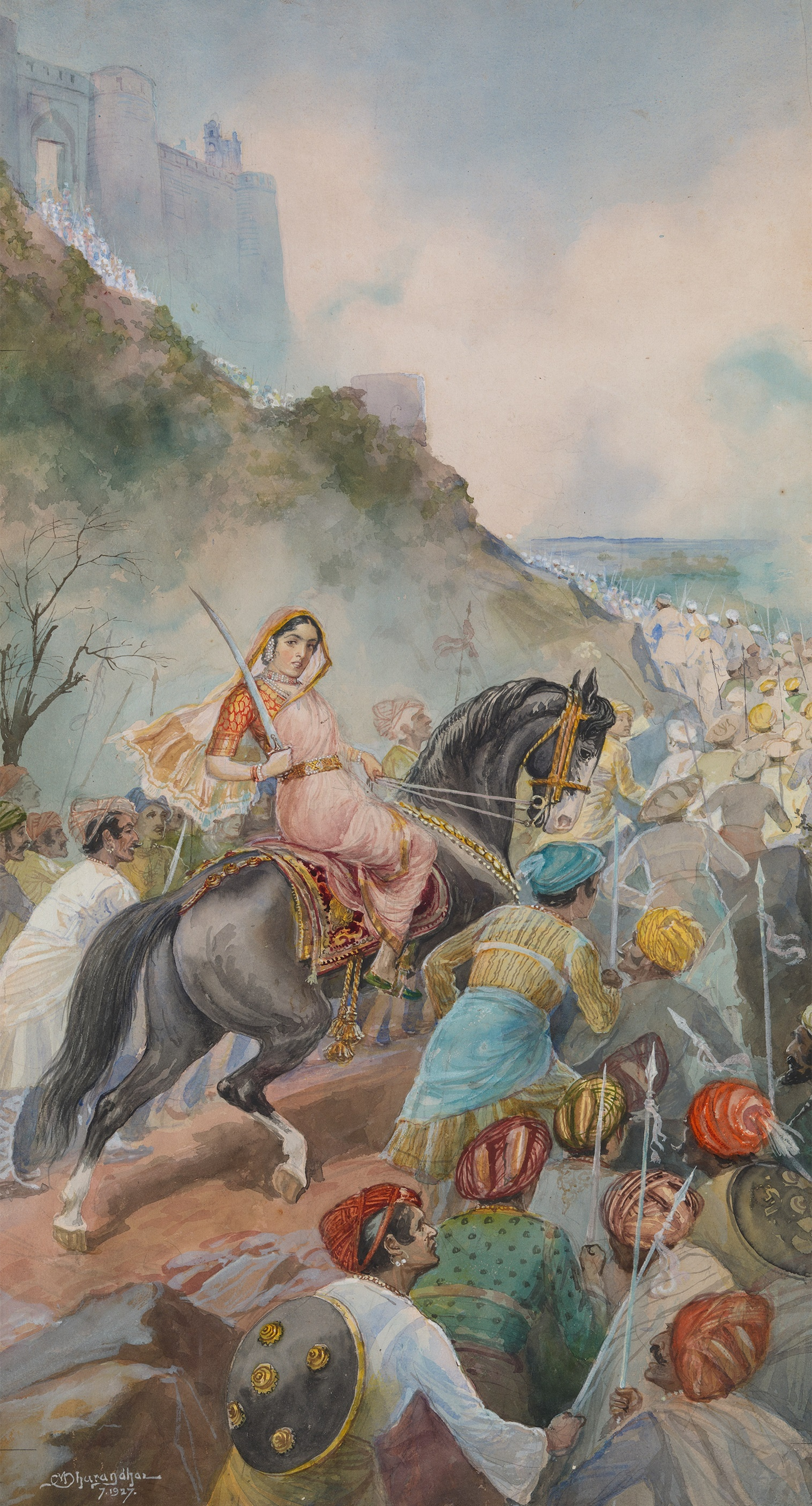
Tarabai

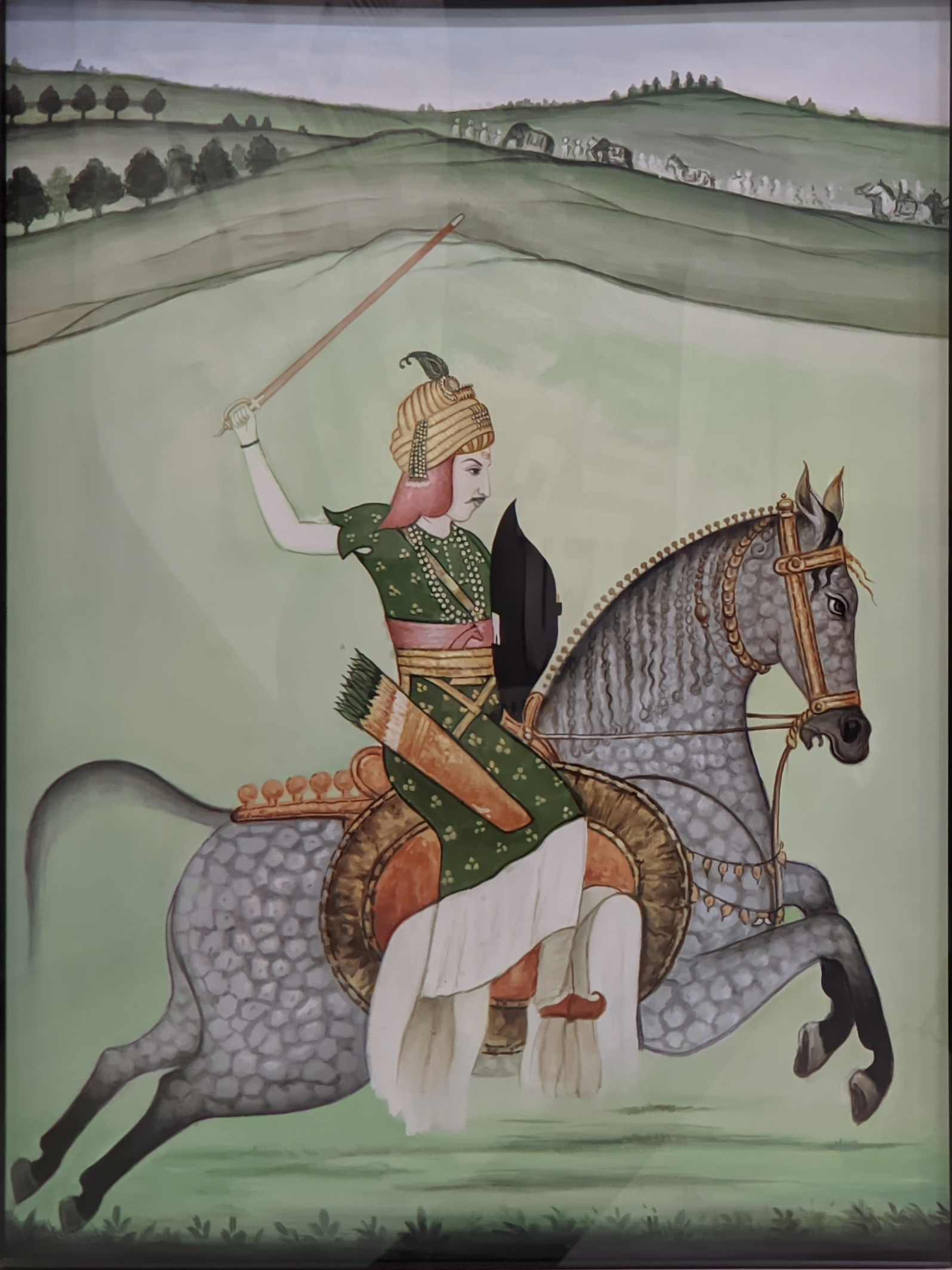
Peshwa Bajirao

Ancient Maharashtrian kingdoms

- Satavahana Empire
- Traikutaka dynasty
- Vakataka dynasty
- Rashtrakuta Empire
- Shilahara dynasty (Konkan)
- Yadava Empire

Mediaeval Maratha kingdoms

The Bhosales (Maharashtra)

- Chattrapati Shahu
- Maloji Bhosale
- Raghoji I Bhonsle
- Rajaram Chhatrapati
- Ramaraja
- Sambhaji
- Shahaji
- Shivaji
- Tarabai

The Jadhavs (Sindkhed Raja-Maharashtra)

- Lakhuji Jadhav
- Jijabai
- Dhanaji Jadhav

The Peshwe

- Moropant Trimbak Pingle
- Nilakanth Moreshvar Pingale
- Ramchandra Pant Amatya
- Bahiroji Pingale
- Parshuram Trimbak Kulkarni
- Balaji Vishwanath
- Madhav-Rao II
- Raghunath-Rao
- Narayan-Rao
- Baji Rao I
- Balaji Bajirao
- Madhav-Rao I

The Bhosales (Thanjavur-Tamil Nadu)

- Ekoji I
- Serfoji II
- Shahuji I
- Serfoji I
- Tukkoji
- Pratapsingh
- Thuljaji
- Shivaji
- Venkoji

The Holkars (Indore-Madhya Pradesh)

- Ahilyabai Holkar
- Malhar Rao Holkar
- Shivajirao Holkar
- Tukojirao Holkar (II)
- Krishna Bai Holkar
- Hari Rao Holkar
- Tukojirao Holkar III
- Yashwantrao Holkar
- Yeshwantrao Holkar II

The Shinde/Scindia (Gwalior-Madhya Pradesh)

- Daulatrao Scindia
- Jankoji Rao Scindia I
- Dattaji Rao Scindia
- Kadarji Rao Scindia
- Manaji Rao Scindia
- George Jivaji Rao Scindia
- Madho Rao Scindia
- Jayajirao Scindia
- Jayapparao Scindia
- Mahadji Shinde
- Ranojirao Scindia

The Newalkars (Jhansi-Uttar Pradesh)

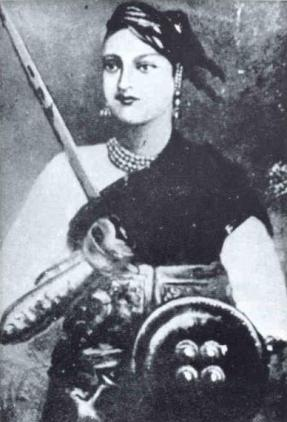
Rani Lakshmibai

- Gangadhar Rao Newalkar
- Lakshmibai

The Gandekars (Bhor-Maharashtra)

- Shankarrao Chimnajirao Gandekar
- Raghunathrao Shankarrao Gandekar

The Pawar (Dhar-Madhya Pradesh)

- Hemendra Singh Rao Pawar
- Krishnaji Rao III Puar
- Tukoji Rao IV Puar
- Tukoji Rao III Puar
- Vikram Singh Rao II Puar

The Ghorpade (Sandur-Karnataka)

- Murari Rao
- Shivashanmukha Rao
- Ramachandra Vitthala Rao
- Venkata Rao III
- Yeshwantrao Ghorpade

The Gaekwad (Baroda-Gujarat)

- Fatehsinghrao Gaekwad
- Pilaji Rao Gaekwad
- Gayatri Devi
- Damaji Rao Gaekwad
- Indira Raje
- Sayajirao Gaekwad III
- Pilaji Rao Gaekwad
- Pratap Singh Gaekwad

== Historic warriors ==
Satavahana Empire(2nd century BCE–Early 3rd century CE)

- Satakarni
- Simuka
- Kanha
- Gautamiputra Satakarni
- Vasishthiputra Pulumavi
- Hāla
- Vashishtiputra Sātakarni
- Satakarni II
- Shalivahana

Vakataka dynasty (Mid 3rd century CE-Early 6th century)

- Pravarasena I
- Vindhyasena
- Narendrasena
- Harishena

Rashtrakuta Empire (753 CE–982 CE)

- Dantidurga
- Krishna I
- Dhruva Dharavarsha
- Govinda III
- Krishna III

Shilahara dynasty of North Konkan (Early 9th century CE-Mid 13th century CE)

- Aparajita
- Arikesarin a.k.a. Keshideva I
- Aparaditya I

Yadava Empire (Mid 9th century CE-Early 14th century CE)

- Bhillama a.k.a. Bhillamadeva
- Simhana a.k.a. Singhaṇadeva
- Krishna a.k.a. Kānharadeva
- Mahādeva
- Rāmachandra a.k.a Rāmadeva

During 17th century and Shivaji's reign

- Peshwa Baji Rao I
- Khemirao Sarnaik
- Govind Rao Khare
- Bajaji Rao Naik Nimbalkar
- Baji Prabhu Deshpande
- Dhanaji Jadhav
- Firangoji Narsala
- Gomaji Naik
- Hambirrao Mohite
- Kanhoji Angre
- Kanhoji Jedhe
- Khanderao Dabhade
- Maynak Bhandari
- Murarbaji Deshpande
- Netaji Palkar
- Prataprao Gujar
- Rango Narayan Orpe
- Santaji Ghorpade
- Tanaji Malusare

During 18th century and Peshwa rule

- Chimnaji Appa
- Chimnaji Phatak
- Malhar Rao Holkar
- Ranoji Bhoite
- Raghuji Bhonsle
- Tukoji Rao Holkar
- Sadashivrao Bhau
- Vishwasrao
- Nana Fadnavis
- Balkrishna Phatak
- Balkrishna Latey

The 27-year war - India's longest fought war (1680–1707)

- Ramchandra Pant Amatya
- Shankaraji Narayan Gandekar
- Pralhad Niraji
- Santaji Ghorpade
- Khanderao Dabhade
- Dhanaji Jadhav
- Tarabai

Leaders of Anglo Maratha Wars I, II, III (1775–1818)

- Bapu Gokhale
- Mahadji Shinde
- Raghunath Rao
- Raghoji II Bhonsale
- Yashwantrao Holkar
- Daulat Scindia
- Peshwa Baji Rao II
- Mudhoji II Bhonsle
- Janoji Bhonsle
- Malharrao Holkar III

== Indian independence movement ==
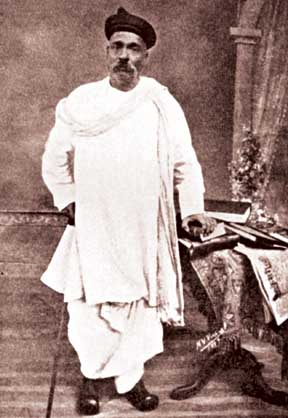
Bal Gangadhar Tilak

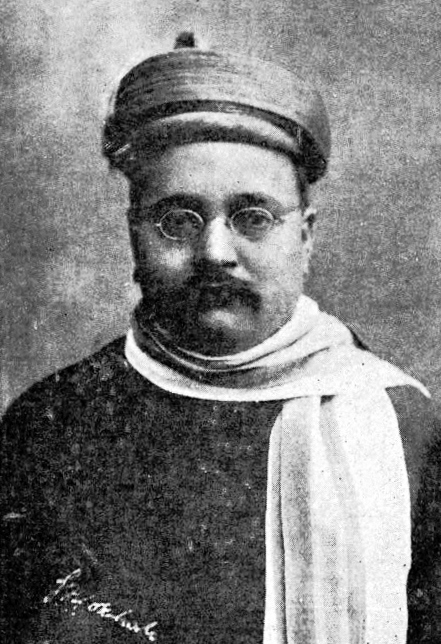
Gopal Krishna Gokhale

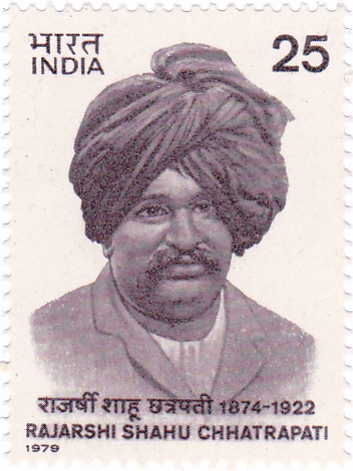
Shahu of Kolhapur

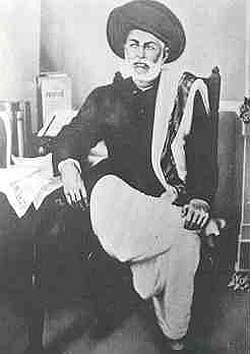
Jyotirao Phule

Vishnu Ganesh Pingle

Leaders of Ist War of Indian Independence (1857)

- Nana Sahib
- Rani Lakshmibai
- Tatya Tope
- Jhalkari Bai

Revolutionaries

- B R Ambedkar
- Bhaurao Patil
- Anant Laxman Kanhere
- Panjabrao Deshmukh
- Abasaheb Khedkar
- Babarao Savarkar
- Ganesh Damodar Savarkar
- Hari Shivaram Rajguru
- Krishnaji Gopal Karve
- Nana Patil
- Pandurang Sadashiv Khankhoje
- Veer Bhai Kotwal
- Vishnu Ganesh Pingle

Father of Indian unrest

- Bal Gangadhar Tilak

Father of Indian armed struggle

- Vasudev Balwant Phadke

First political murder in Indian freedom struggle

- Chapekar brothers

First Secret Society for Independence

- Vinayak Damodar Savarkar

Others

- Yashwantrao Chavan
- Keshavrao Jedhe
- K. B. Hedgewar
- Achyut Patwardhan
- Gangadhar Adhikari
- Shankarrao Chavan
- B. S. Moonje
- Babu Genu
- Shripad Amrit Dange
- Dada Dharmadhikari
- Ganesh Shrikrishna Khaparde
- Gopal Krishna Gokhale
- Rango Bapuji Gupte
- Narahar Vishnu Gadgil
- Madhav Shrihari Aney
- Gangadharrao Balkrishna Deshpande
- Narasimha Chintaman Kelkar
- Thakurdas Bang
- Narayan Malhar Joshi
- Ravindra Kelekar
- Senapati Bapat
- Mohan Ranade
- Vasukaka Joshi
- Shankarrao Deo
- Vinoba Bhave
- Reuben Dhondji Ashtumkar
- Vasantdada Patil
- Nagnath Naikwadi
- Swami Ramanand Tirtha
- Nath Pai
- Ranjit Pandit
- Shivlinga Shivacharya Maharaj

== Humanitarians and reformers ==
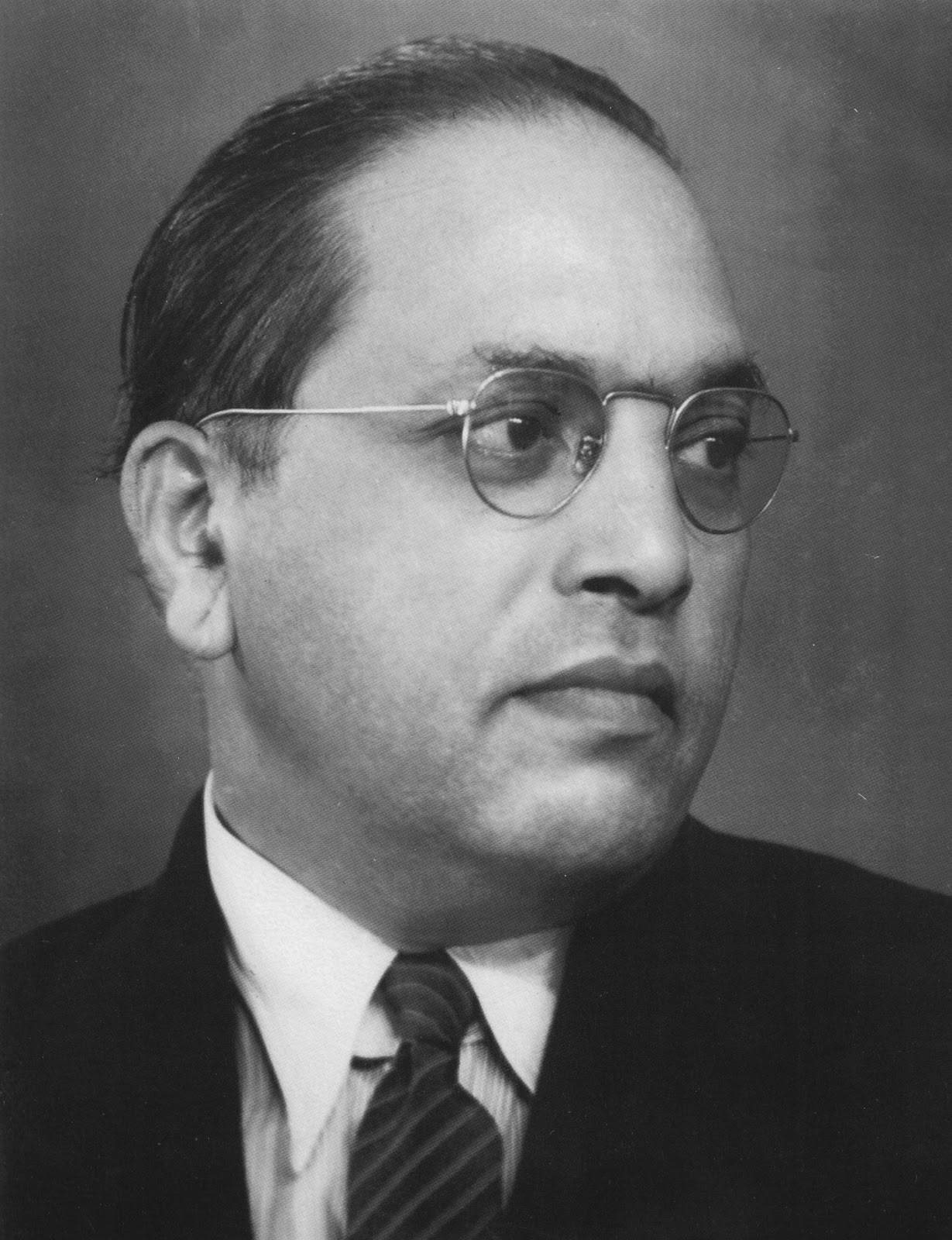
Babasaheb Ambedkar

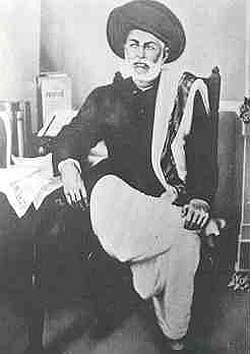
Jyotirao Phule

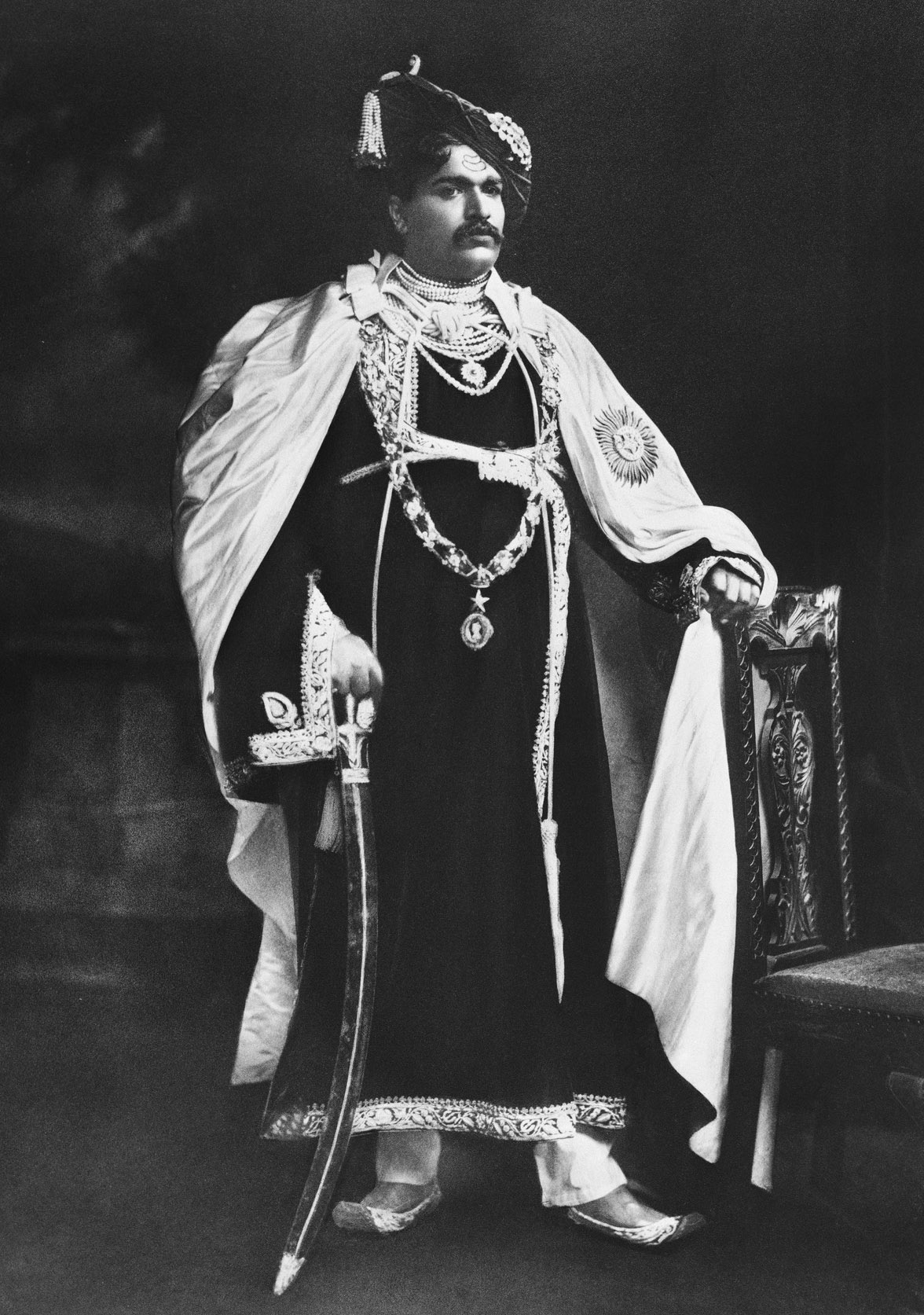
Rajarshi Shahu Maharaj

Father of renaissance of western India

- Mahadev Govind Ranade

Reformers

- B. R. Ambedkar
- Dhondo Keshav Karve
- Gopal Ganesh Agarkar
- Gopal Hari Deshmukh
- Gopal Krishna Gokhale
- Atmaram Pandurang
- Jyotiba Phule
- Rajarshi Shahu Maharaj
- Panjabrao Deshmukh
- Vinayak Damodar Savarkar
- Maharshi Vitthal Ramji Shinde
- Savitribai Phule
- Dinkarrao Javalkar

Bene Israeli reformer and scholar

- Joseph Ezekiel Rajpurkar

Social activists

- Abhay and Rani Bang
- Anna Hazare
- Annabhau Sathe
- Baba Amte
- Karmaveer Bhaurao Patil
- Nana Patekar
- Nanaji Deshmukh
- Nanasaheb Parulekar
- Narayan Chandavarkar
- Narendra Dabholkar
- Pandita Ramabai
- Ramabai Ranade
- Prakash Amte
- Mandakini Amte
- Raghunath Karve
- R. G. Bhandarkar
- Sharad Anantrao Joshi
- Eknath Ranade
- Durgabai
- Shobhana Ranade
- Damodar Bapat
- Ram Ingole

Philanthropists

- Nirmala Deshpande
- Gopal Baba Walangkar
- Sindhutai Sapkal
- Jagannath Shankarshet
- Sane Guruji
- Purushottam Kakodkar
- V. M. Tarkunde
- Kaka Kalelkar

== Defence leaders ==
Father of Indian Navy

- Chhatrapati Shivaji Maharaj

First living recipient of the Param Vir Chakra

- Rama Raghoba Rane

Third woman in the Indian Armed Forces to be promoted to a Three-star rank

- Madhuri Kanitkar

ARMY
Generals

- J. R. Bhonsle
- Gopal Gurunath Bewoor
- Arun Shridhar Vaidya
- Manoj Mukund Naravane

Lieutenant Generals

- S. P. P. Thorat
- Rajendra Ramrao Nimbhorkar
- Vinod G. Khandare
- Madhuri Kanitkar
- D. B. Shekatkar
- Shailesh Tinaikar

Others

- Brigadier John Dalvi
- Jagannath Raoji Chitnis
- A.K. Sarwate
- Sudhir Sawant

NAVY
Admirals

- Bhaskar S. Soman
- Jayant Ganpat Nadkarni
- Vishnu Bhagwat

Vice/Rear Admirals

- Manohar Prahlad Awati
- S. G. Karmarkar
- Murlidhar Sadashiv Pawar
- Satish Namdeo Ghormade
- SV Bhokare
- Benjamin Abraham Samson
- Ravindra Jayant Nadkarni
- Rajesh Pendharkar

Others

- Mohan Narayan Rao Samant
- Dilip Donde
- Kulbhushan Jadhav

AIR FORCE
Air Chief Marshal

- Hrushikesh Moolgavkar
- Lakshman Madhav Katre
- Anil Tipnis
- Pradeep Vasant Naik
- Vivek Ram Chaudhari

Air Marshal

- Shirish Baban Deo
- Suryakant Chintaman Chafekar

Others

- Squadron Leader Vijay Karnik
- Flt lt V. V. Tambay

== Religion and spirituality ==
Father of Hindu Nationalism in India

- Vinayak Damodar Savarkar

Datta Sampradaya

- Narsimha Saraswati
- Saraswati Gangadhar
- Swami Samarth
- Rang Avadhoot
- Gagangiri Maharaj
- Vasudevanand Saraswati
- Nana Maharaj Taranekar
- Janardan Swami

Mahanubhava Sampradaya

- Chakradhar Swami
- Mhaimbhat

Warkari Movement

- Dnyaneshwar
- Muktabai
- Nivruttinath
- Sopan
- Namdev
- Chokhamela
- Eknath
- Tukaram
- Savata Mali

Ganapatyas

- Morya Gosavi

Late medieval period Saints (1200–1526)

- Mukundraj
- Gora Kumbhar
- Santaji Jagnade
- Samarth Ramdas
- Changdev Maharaj
- Janabai
- Kanhopatra
- Damaji

Early modern period Saints (1526–1858)

- Swami Samarth
- Brahma Chaitanya

Swadhyaya Movement

- Pandurang Shastri Athavale
- Jayshree Talwalkar

Prarthana Samaj

- Dadoba Pandurang
- Atmaram Pandurang
- Narayan Chandavarkar
- Vithal Krishnaji Khedkar

Modern period, independence and after (1858–1947)

- Gagangiri Maharaj
- Pant Maharaj Balekundrikar
- Nana Dharmadhikari
- Sant Gadge Baba
- Shirdi Sai Baba
- Gajanan Maharaj
- Upasni Maharaj
- Gulabrao Maharaj
- Jangali Maharaj
- Shri Madhavnath Maharaj
- Tukdoji Maharaj
- Nisargadatta Maharaj
- Tukamai
- Nana Maharaj Taranekar
- Shri Mataji Nirmala Devi
- Ezekiel Isaac Malekar

RSS Members

- M. S. Golwalkar
- Laxman Vasudev Paranjape
- Mohan Bhagwat
- Nathuram Godse

Marathi Kirtankar

- Indurikar Maharaj

== Politics ==
Speaker of Lok Sabha

- Ganesh Vasudev Mavalankar
- Shivraj Patil
- Manohar Joshi
- Sumitra Mahajan

First female President of India

- Pratibha Patil

Deputy Prime Minister of India

- Yashwantrao Chavan

First female Chief Minister of Goa

- Shashikala Kakodkar

First female Chief Minister of Rajasthan

- Vasundhara Raje

First Chief Minister of Goa

- Dayanand Bandodkar

First Chief Minister of Uttar Pradesh

- Govind Ballabh Pant

First Chief Minister of Bombay State

- B. G. Kher

First Hindu and first man of Indian descent to be elected to the Scottish Parliament

- Sandesh Gulhane

First General Secretary of the Communist Party of India.

- S.V. Ghate

Founder of All India Trade Union Congress

- Narayan Malhar Joshi

Goa's first woman parliamentarian

- Sanyogita Rane

Samyukta Maharashtra Movement

- Keshavrao Jedhe
- Shreedhar Mahadev Joshi
- Shripad Amrit Dange
- Narayan Ganesh Gore
- Pralhad Keshav Atre
- Keshav Sitaram Thackeray
- Pandurang Mahadev Bapat
- S.K. Patil

Union Cabinet Ministers

- B. R. Ambedkar
- R. R. Diwakar
- N.V. Gadgil
- B. V. Keskar
- C. D. Deshmukh
- Govind Ballabh Pant
- Dr.Panjabrao Deshmukh
- Hari Vinayak Pataskar
- Yashwantrao Chavan
- Madhu Dandavate
- Tukaram Shrangare
- Shankarrao Chavan
- Vasant Sathe
- Saroj Khaparde
- Madho Rao Scindia
- Shivraj Patil
- Sharad Pawar
- Nitin Gadkari
- Suresh Prabhu
- Jyotiraditya Scindia

Others

- Marotrao Kannamwar
- Ashok Chavan
- Ajit Pawar
- Anant Gadgil
- Anand Dighe
- Babasaheb Ambedkar
- Bal Thackeray
- Balasaheb Vikhe Patil
- Balasaheb Desai
- Chhagan Bhujbal
- Devendra Fadnavis
- Dhulappa Bhaurao Navale
- Eknath Khadse
- Eknath Shinde
- K. B. Hedgewar
- Dutta Samant
- Gopal Krishna Gokhale
- Gopinath Munde
- Harshavardhan Patil
- Krishna Chandra Pant
- Kapil Moreshwar Patil
- Lokmanya Tilak
- Manohar Joshi
- Narayan Rane
- Prakash Ambedkar
- Pramod Mahajan
- Pratapsinh Rane
- Prithviraj Chavan
- Ramdas Athavale
- Radhakrishna Vikhe Patil
- Raj Thackeray
- Ratnappa Kumbhar
- R. R. Patil
- Raksha Khadse
- Shivajirao Patil Nilangekar
- Shivajirao Adhalarao Patil
- Shivraj Patil
- Shrikant Shinde
- Sushilkumar Shinde
- Vasantdada Patil
- Vasantrao Naik
- Vilasrao Deshmukh
- Vinod Tawde
- Vitthalrao Gadgil
- Uddhav Thackeray
- Sanjay Dhotre
- Anil Shirole
- Siddharth Shirole
- S. R. Patil
- Vivek Narayan Shejwalkar
- Yashodhara Raje Scindia
- Chandrakant Patil
- Udaysingrao Gaikwad
- Raju Shetti
- Ruturaj Patil
- Dhananjay Mahadik
- Satej Patil
- C. R. Patil
- Chandroji Angre
- Sambhaji Angre
- Dinkar Rao
- Kushabhau Thakre

United Kingdom and Irish politics

- Pratap Chitnis, Baron Chitnis
- Leo Varadkar

American politics

- Ameya Pawar
- Kumar P. Barve
- Kshama Sawant
- Nitin Pradhan
- Swati Dandekar
- Ajit V. Pai
- Shri Thanedar

Goa legislative Assembly

- Govind Gaude
- Ramesh Tawadkar
- Subhash Phal Desai
- Sudin Dhavalikar
- Nilkanth Halarnkar

== Bureaucrats and diplomats ==
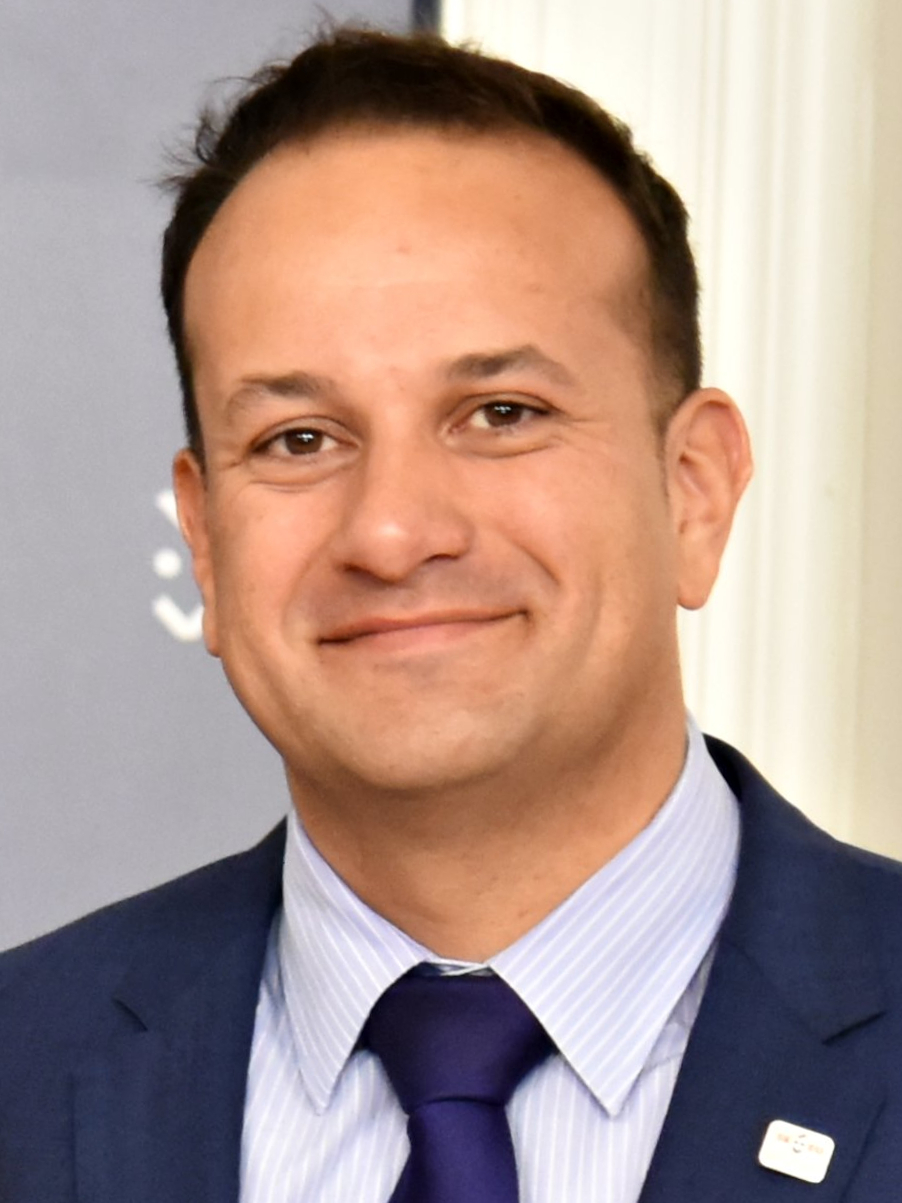
Leo Varadkar- Irish Fine Gael politician and Taoiseach

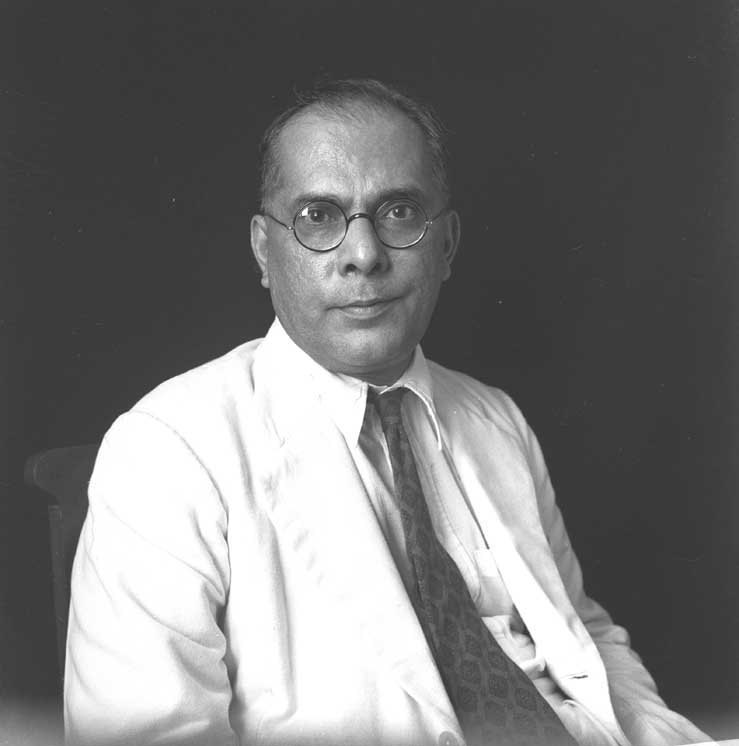
Yashwant Narayan Sukthankar was the second Cabinet Secretary of India.

Foreign Service

- R. D. Sathe
- Ambassador Dnyaneshwar Mulay
- Ashok B. Gokhale
- Apa Sahib
- Ravindra Mhatre
- Atul Khare
- Vijay Keshav Gokhale

Indian Administrative Service

- Avinash Dharmadhikari
- C. B. Bhave
- C. D. Deshmukh
- Kiran Karnik
- Vijay Kelkar
- B. G. Kher
- N. G. Gore
- Uttam Khobragade
- Devyani Khobragade
- Amit Khare
- Bhausaheb Ubale
- Gautam Bambawale

Indian Civil Service

- N. Vittal
- Y. N. Sukthankar
- B.G. Deshmukh
- Achyut Madhav Gokhale
- J. W. Bhore
- Gurunath Venkatesh Bewoor
- C. R. Krishnaswamy Rao Sahib
- D. S. Joshi
- R. Ramachandra Rao

== Founder, jurists and lawyers ==
Law and Justice Minister

- B.R. Ambedkar

Chief Justice of India

- D. Y. Chandrachud
- P. B. Gajendragadkar
- Y. V. Chandrachud
- V.N. Khare
- Sharad Arvind Bobde
- Uday Umesh Lalit

Supreme Court Judges

- Ajay Manikrao Khanwilkar
- P. B. Sawant
- Sudhakar Panditrao Kurdukar
- Hemant Laxman Gokhale
- Bhushan Ramkrishna Gavai
- U. U. Lalit
- Sujata Manohar
- V. D. Tulzapurkar
- J. R. Mudholkar
- Hemant Gokhale

International lawyers

- Harish Salve
- M. R. Jayakar
- Sakharam Ganesh Pandit

Others

- Moropant Vishvanath Joshi
- G. S. Khaparde
- Prabodh Dinkarrao Desai
- J. R. Mudholkar
- Naresh Harishchandra Patil
- Ujjwal Nikam
- S. B. Tambe
- V. S. Sirpurkar

== Business, trade and industries ==
Baba Kalyani was chairman and managing director of Bharat Forge.

Father of Indian Trade Union Movement

- Narayan Meghaji Lokhande

Founder of the Asia's first Cooperative sugar factory.

- Vithalrao Vikhe Patil

Others

- Abasaheb Garware
- Chandrashekhar Agashe
- Dnyaneshwar Agashe
- Baba Kalyani
- Baburao Govindrao Shirke
- Baburaoji Parkhe
- Deepak Ghaisas
- Dinesh Keskar
- Vasudev Salgaocar
- D.S.Kulkarni
- Girish Paranjpe
- Harsh Chitale
- Kalpana Saroj
- Kiran Karnik
- Laxmanrao Kirloskar
- Nitin Paranjpe
- Panditrao Agashe
- Rajendra Pawar
- Raosaheb Gogte
- Ravi Pandit
- Sanjay Kirloskar
- Shri Thanedar
- Subhash Runwal
- Suhas Patil
- Suresh Haware
- Vikram Pandit
- Vivek Ranadive
- Vasantrao Ghatge
- Dilip Dandekar
- Mandar Agashe
- Rajeev Samant
- Sunil Khandbahale
- Dajikaka Gadgil
- Vithal Balkrishna Gandhi
- Leena Tewari
- Prakash Apte
- Vivek Ranadivé
- Sachin S. Lawande
- Abhi Talwalkar
- Rajendra Singh Pawar

== Fiscal policy leaders ==
First Indian to be appointed the Governor of the Reserve Bank of India.

- C. D. Deshmukh

RBI Governors

- C. D. Deshmukh
- K. G. Ambegaonkar
- B. N. Adarkar

Economists

- Bhalchandra Mungekar
- Narendra Jadhav
- Srikant Datar
- Sukhadeo Thorat
- Ajit Ranade
- Avinash Dixit
- Dattatreya Gopal Karve
- Devdatta Dabholkar
- Dhananjay Ramchandra Gadgil
- Gopal Krishna Gokhale
- Lalita D. Gupte
- Ram G. Takwale
- Sukhadeo Thorat
- Vivek Kulkarni
- Suresh Tendulkar
- Usha Thorat
- Amrita Narlikar
- Vijay Kelkar
- Vikram Limaye

== Academicians/educationists ==
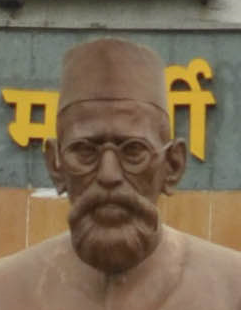
Dhondo Keshav Karve

Ancient Maharashtrian academicians

- Nagarjuna
- Shripati
- Bhaskaracharya
- Hemadri a.k.a. Hemāḍi Panḍita or Hemāḍapanta
- Jñaneśvara
- Jayatirtha
- Gaṇeśa Daivajna
- Bhattoji Dikshita
- Munishvara
- Kamalakara
- Gagabhatta
- Jagannatha Samrat
- Bhaskararaya

Founder of India's First Women University

- Dhondo Keshav Karve

Founder of Indian Sociology & Sociology in India

- G. S. Ghurye

Founder and president of the Symbiosis Society

- S. B. Mujumdar

Founding director of the Indian Institute of Technology Kanpur

- P. K. Kelkar

Founder of Fergusson College

- Lokmanya Tilak

First female teacher of India

- Savitribai Phule

First female Indian anthropologist

- Irawati Karve

Most qualified person of India

- Shrikant Jichkar

Pioneers in women's education

- Jyotiba Phule
- Shalini Moghe
- Justice Ranade
- Ramakrishna Gopal Bhandarkar

Founder of Balwadi

- Tarabai Modak

Indologists

- Pandurang Vaman Kane
- V.S. Sukthankar
- Irawati Karve
- G. T. Deshpande
- Malati Shendge
- R. N. Dandekar

Global Teacher Prize recipient

- Ranjitsinh Disale

Father of Marathi journalism.

- Balshastri Jambhekar

Others

- Gopal Ganesh Agarkar
- Achyut Kanvinde
- Ajit Rangnekar
- Anutai Wagh
- D. Y. Patil
- Dilip Gaonkar
- Jayant Naik
- Madho Rao Scindia
- T. Gopala Rao
- Laxmanshastri Joshi
- C. D. Deshpande
- Surendra Sheodas Barlingay
- Chitra Naik
- Anand Teltumbde
- T. Madhava Rao
- Prabhakar Vaidya
- Anant Raje
- Uday Salunkhe
- Vishnushastri Chiplunkar
- Pravin Patkar
- P. A. Inamdar
- Shivrampant Damle
- Jyoti Gogte
- Trimbak Krishna Tope

== Sciences ==
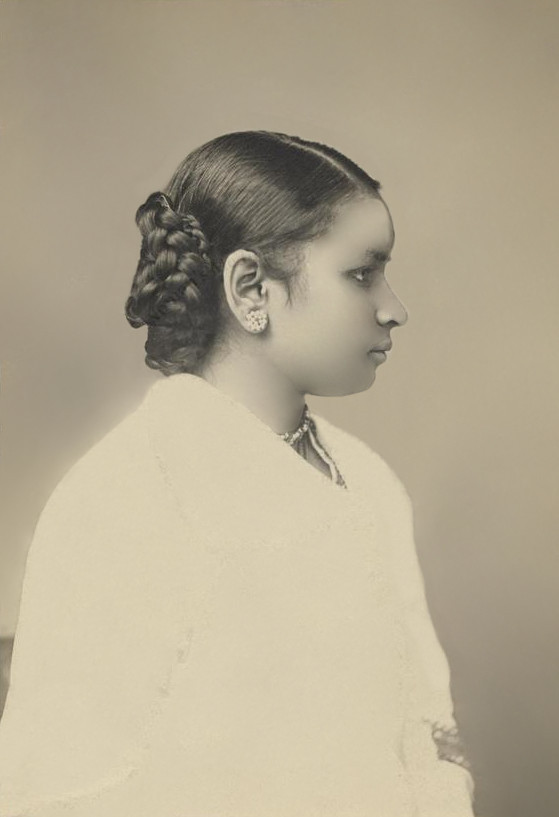
Dr. Anandi Gopal Joshi, first Indian lady doctor and physician

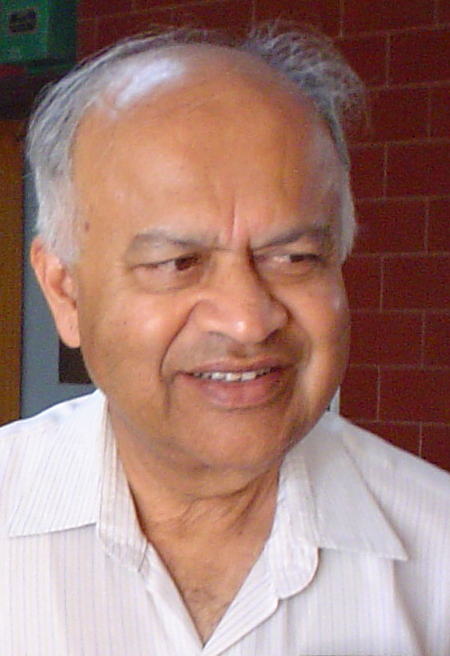
Astrophysicists Jayant Narlikar

=== Chemistry ===
- Bal Dattatreya Tilak
- N. K. Naik
- Raghunath Anant Mashelkar
- Shankar Abaji Bhise
- Shridhar Ramachandra Gadre
- Shridhar Sathe
- Waman Bapuji Metre
- B. D. Kulkarni
- Vivek Ranade
- Ashish Kishore Lele
- J. B. Joshi
- G. D. Yadav
- Narasinh Narayan Godbole
- Pramod P. Wangikar
- Yogesh M. Joshi
- Amol Arvindrao Kulkarni
- Samir Mitragotri
- Sagar Jamane

=== Earth sciences ===
First Indian Women to Antarctica

- Aditi Pant

Seed Mother of India

- Rahibai Soma Popere

Father of the Indian Seed Industry

- B. R. Barwale

Others

- Pandurang Khankhoje
- Waman Bapuji Metre
- Ashok Gadgil
- Raghunath Vithal Khedkar
- Madhav Gadgil
- Nalini Nadkarni
- Atmaram Sadashiv Jayakar
- Nandini Nimbkar
- Pandurang Vasudeo Sukhatme
- Raghavendra Gadagkar
- Shya Chitaley
- S. B. Mujumdar
- Shankar Purushottam Agharkar
- Shripad Dabholkar
- B. V. Nimbkar
- Satish Ramnath Shetye
- Natasha Mhatre
- Prafullachandra Vishnu Sane
- K. V. Ghorpade
- Atmaram Bhairav Joshi
- Dadaji Ramaji Khobragade
- Isaac David Kehimkar
- Sharad P. Kale
- B.G. Matapurkar

=== Engineering and technology ===
Father of Indian Super Computers

- Vijay P. Bhatkar

First U.S. Chief Data Scientist

- DJ Patil

Others

- Abhi Talwalkar
- Arvind Joshi
- Aniruddha M. Gole
- Atul Chitnis
- Aravind Joshi
- Girish Wagh
- Prashant Ranade
- Satyendra Pakhale
- Shamkant Navathe
- Subhash Khot
- Arun G. Phadke
- Anil Kamath
- Suhas Patankar
- Vikas Joshi
- Vishnu Madav Ghatage
- Yashavant Kanetkar
- Shakuntala Joshi
- Ramesh Raskar
- Deepak B. Phatak
- Sarita Adve
- Sunil Khandbahale
- Ashwin Gumaste
- Achyut Godbole
- Sanjay Govind Dhande

=== Mathematics and statistics ===
First Indian to be Senior Wrangler

- R. P. Paranjpye

Others

- Eknath Ghate
- Bapudeva Sastri
- Damodar Dharmananda Kosambi
- Chandrashekhar Khare
- D. R. Kaprekar
- Dinesh Thakur
- Kapil Hari Paranjape
- M. N. Vartak
- Narendra Karmarkar
- Rahul Pandharipande
- Mangala Narlikar
- Rajeeva Karandikar
- S. S. Shrikhande
- Shreeram Shankar Abhyankar
- Vinay V. Deodhar
- Vivek Borkar
- Pandurang Vasudeo Sukhatme
- Subhash Khot
- Ravindra Shripad Kulkarni
- Vishnu Vasudev Narlikar
- Ravindra Bapat

=== Medicine and surgery ===
First Indian Female Physician

- Anandi Gopal Joshi

First Indian Female to receive PhD

- Kamala Sohonie

Father of Pathology and Medical Research

- V. R. Khanolkar

ICMR Scientists

- Chintaman Govind Pandit
- Raman Gangakhedkar

Immunologist

- K. B. Sainis
- Dinakar M. Salunke

Others

- Abhay and Rani Bang
- Amit Prabhakar Maydeo
- Atul Gawande
- Bhau Daji
- Chetan E. Chitnis
- Nilima Arun Kshirsagar
- Dwarkanath Kotnis
- Himmatrao Bawaskar
- Irawati Karve
- Krishna Chandra Chunekar
- Kamal Ranadive
- Prakash Amte
- S. B. Mujumdar
- Kanhoba Ranchoddas Kirtikar
- Shekhar C. Mande
- Shashank R. Joshi
- Shubha Tole
- Suresh Jayakar
- Bhalchandra Nilkanth Purandare
- Vithal Nagesh Shirodkar
- Kshama Metre
- Ramakant Krishnaji Deshpande
- Jayant B. Udgaonkar
- Rajesh Sudhir Gokhale
- N. R. Pathak
- Sanjeev Galande
- Sakharam Arjun
- Kshama Metre
- Tatyarao Lahane
- Ashok Laxmanrao Kukade
- Suhas Pandurang Sukhatme
- Rajendra Achyut Badwe
- Pramod P. Wangikar
- Jerusha Jhirad
- Jyeshtharaj Joshi
- Vikas Mahatme
- Mansukh C. Wani
- Maneesha S. Inamdar
- Milind Vasant Kirtane
- Jagannath Dixit
- Nikhil Dhurandhar
- Prabhu B. Patil
- Ganesh Bagler
- Suresh Jadhav (biotechnology executive)

=== Physics ===
Astronomy

- Venkatesh Bapuji Ketakar
- Bal Gangadhar Tilak

Nuclear scientists

- Anil Kakodkar
- Suhas Pandurang Sukhatme
- Vijay Raghunath Pandharipande
- Shivram Baburao Bhoje
- Waman Dattatreya Patwardhan

Fellow of Royal Society

- Raghunath Anant Mashelkar
- Subhash Khot

Theoretical physicists

- Abhay Ashtekar
- Atish Dabholkar
- Rohini Godbole

Astro - physicists

- Jayant Narlikar
- Amol Dighe
- Avinash Deshpande
- Nissim Kanekar
- S.M. Chitre
- Chanda Jog
- Shrinivas Kulkarni

ISRO and DRDO scientists

- Vasant Gowarikar
- Pramod Kale
- Vasudev Kalkunte Aatre

Indian Institute Of Technology(IIT) - Chairman/Directors

- P. K. Kelkar
- Abhay Karandikar

Aerospace engineering

- N. K. Naik
- Shivkar Bapuji Talpade

Others

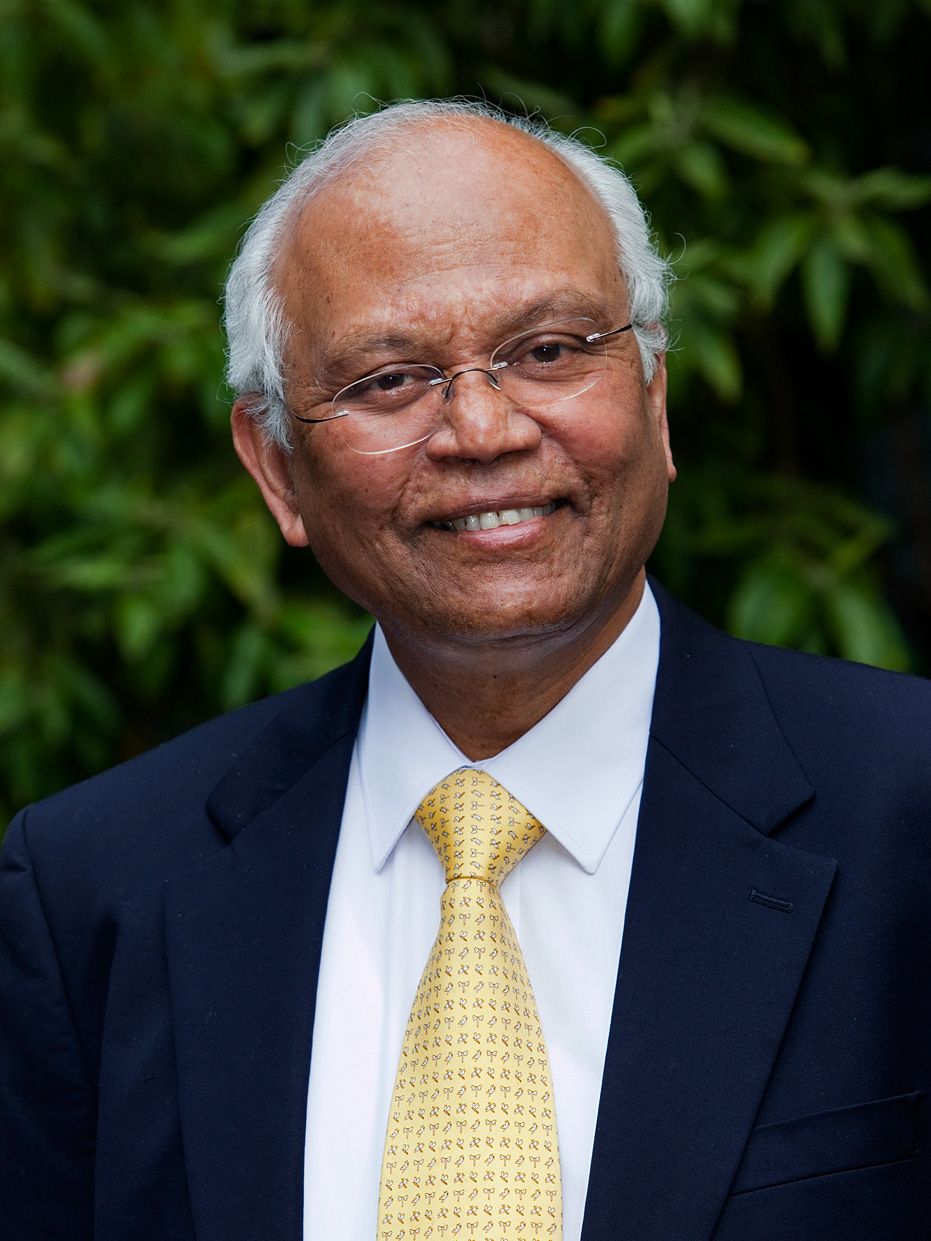
Raghunath Anant Mashelkar

- Anupam Saraph
- Sachin Lawande
- Arun Nigavekar
- Gopal H. Gaonkar
- Pramod Khargonekar
- Sulabha K Kulkarni
- Umesh Waghmare
- Sanjay Govind Dhande
- Dilip Devidas Bhawalkar
- Sanjeev Dhurandhar
- Sunil Khandbahale
- Neelima Gupte
- Vivek Borkar
- Mandar Madhukar Deshmukh

=== Industrial design ===
- Satyendra Pakhale
- Sumant Moolgaokar

== Arts ==
=== Cinema and theatre ===
Father of Indian Cinema

Dadasaheb Phalke - Maker of India's first full-length feature Raja Harishchandra

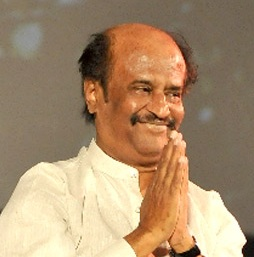
Rajinikanth -Shivaji Rao Gaekwad

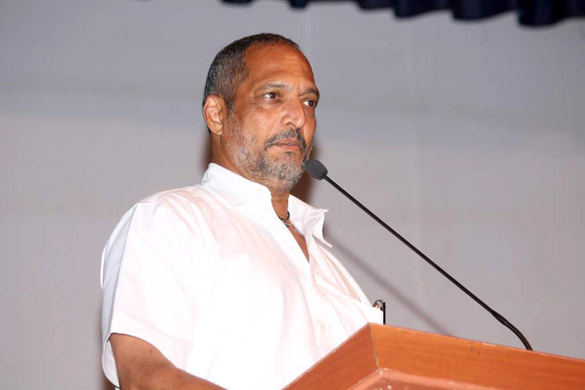
Nana Patekar

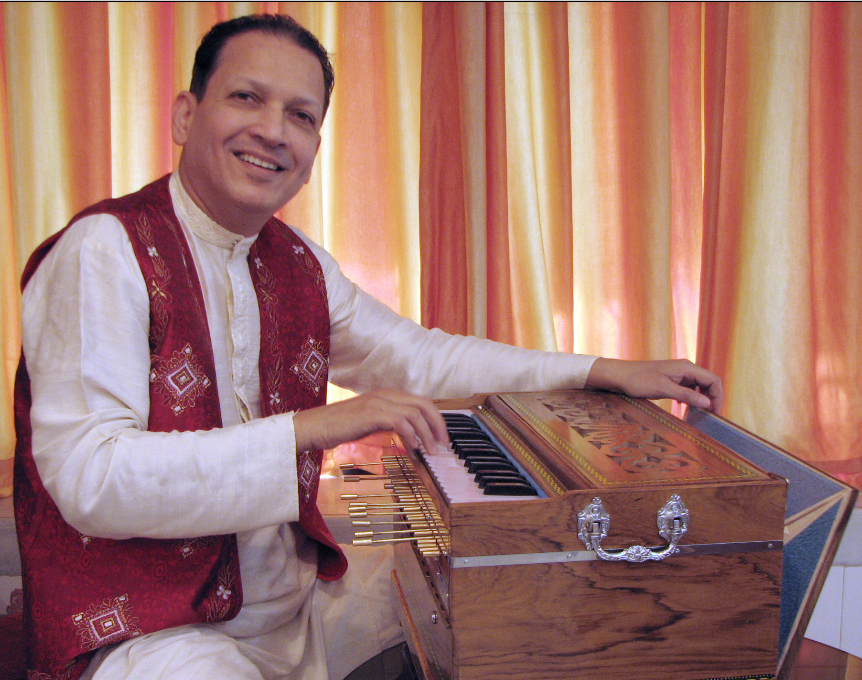
Dr. Vidyadhar Oke with 22-microtone harmonium

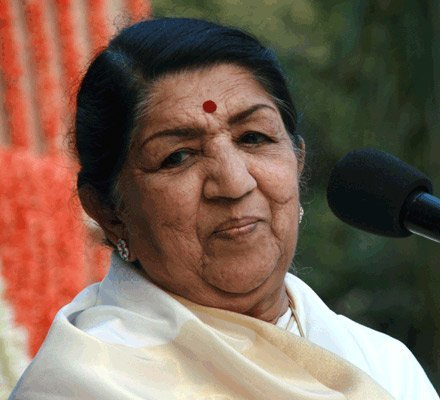
Lata Mangeshkar

First Indian to receive the Oscar

Bhanu Athaiya

First female actress of India

Durgabai Kamat

Dada Saheb Phalke Award - Lifetime contribution to Indian Cinema

- Durga Khote
- V. Shantaram
- Lata Mangeshkar
- Bhalji Pendharkar
- Asha Bhosle
- Rajinikanth

Actors

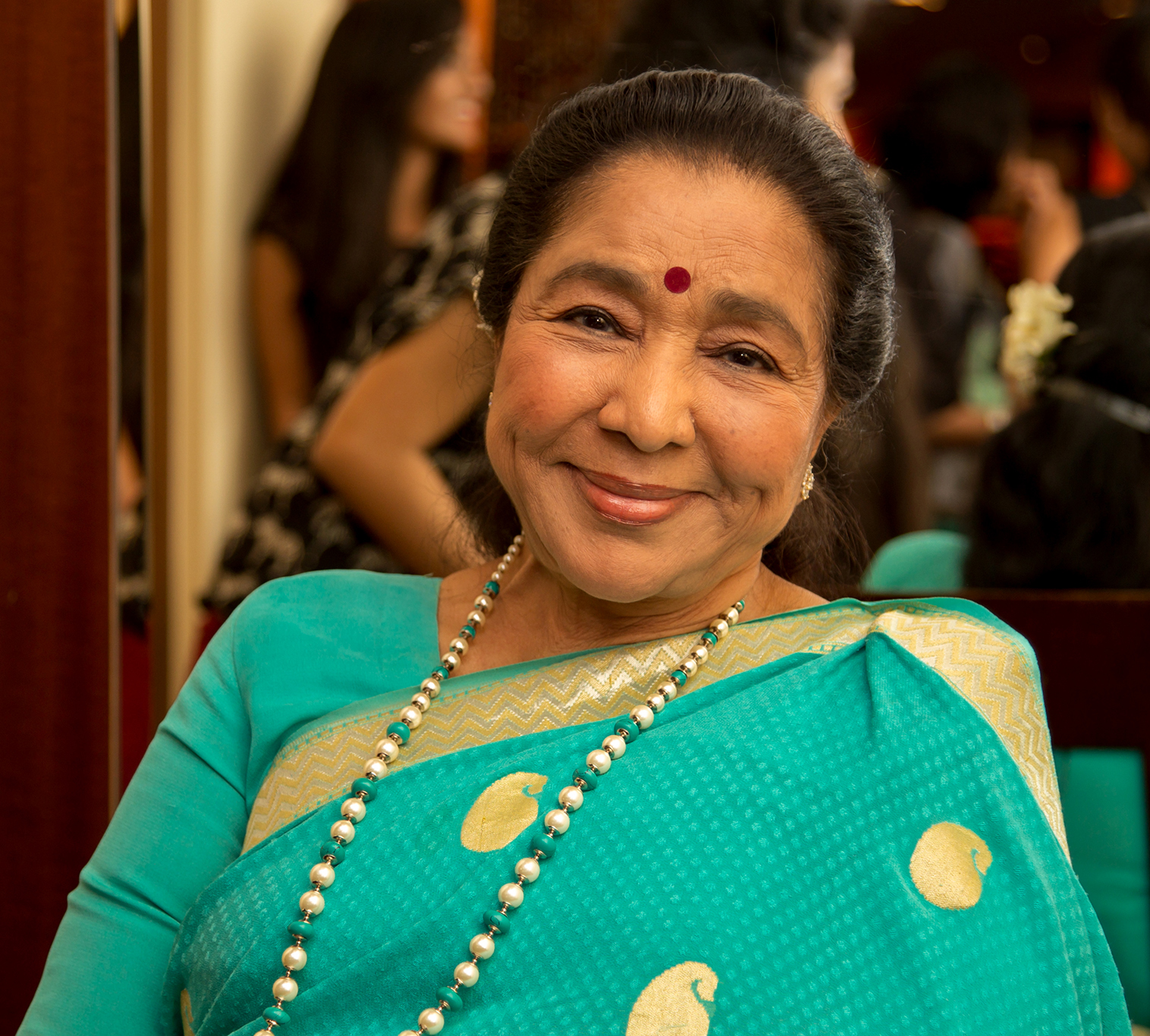
Asha Bhosle

- Ajinkya Dev
- Ashok Saraf
- Amol Palekar
- Bharat Jadhav
- Dada Kondke
- David Abraham Cheulkar
- Dilip Prabhavalkar
- Kanan Kaushal
- Kashinath Ghanekar
- Kuldeep Pawar
- Laxmikant Berde
- Mahesh Kothare
- Makrand Deshpande
- Milind Gunaji
- Milind Soman
- Mohan Agashe
- Mohan Gokhale
- Nana Patekar
- Nagesh Bhosale
- Nitish Bharadwaj
- Nilu Phule
- Prashant Damle
- Prasad Oak
- Rajnikant
- Ramesh Bhatkar
- Raqesh Vashisth
- Riteish Deshmukh
- Sachiin J Joshi
- Sachin Khedekar
- Sachin Pilgaonkar
- Sadashiv Amrapurkar
- Sanjay Narvekar
- Sayaji Shinde
- Shivaji Satam
- Shreyas Talpade
- Shriram Lagoo
- Siddharth Jadhav
- Subodh Bhave
- Sudhir Joshi
- Upendra Limaye
- Vikram Gokhale
- Vijayendra Ghatge
- Viju Khote
- Vivek Lagoo
- Mohan Joshi
- Ankush Chaudhari
- Arun Sarnaik
- Ravindra Mahajani
- Gashmeer Mahajani
- Akash Thosar
- Umesh Kamat
- Pushkar Shrotri
- Swapnil Joshi
- Keshavrao Date
- Shrikant Moghe
- Master Vithal
- Harshvardhan Rane

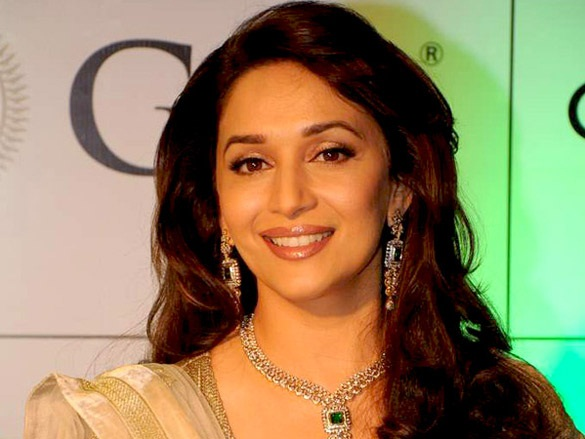
Madhuri Dixit

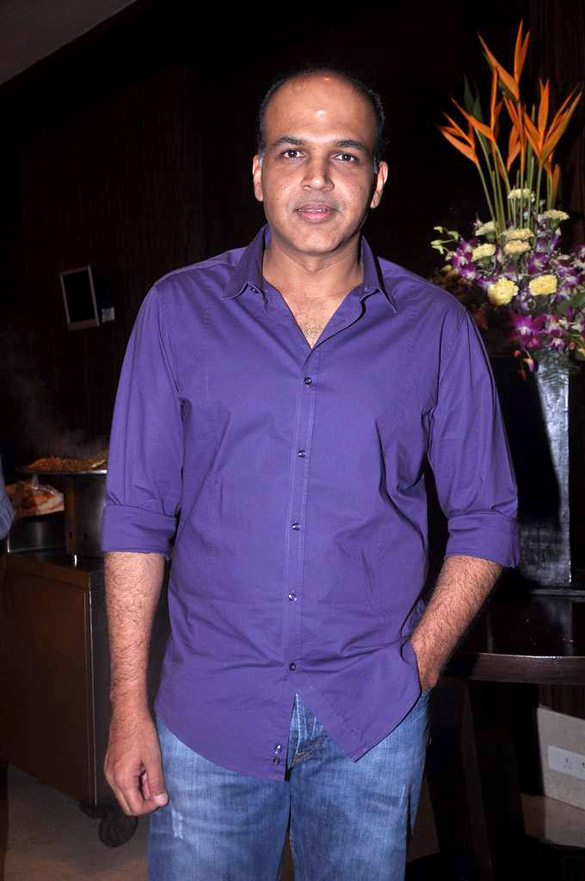
Ashutosh Gowariker, directed Lagaan (nominated for Oscars, has 5 filmfare, 7 international awards)

Actresses

- Aditi Sarangdhar
- Aaditi Pohankar
- Amruta Khanvilkar
- Amruta Patki
- Ankita Lokhande
- Anjana Mumtaz
- Antara Mali
- Ashalata Wabgaonkar
- Ashwini Bhave
- Bhagyashree Patwardhan
- Bhargavi Chirmule
- Durga Khote
- Durgabai Kamat
- Hansa Wadkar
- Shanta Apte
- Gauri Pradhan Tejwani
- Jayshree Gadkar
- Jyothika
- Kajal Kiran
- Kajol
- Kimi Katkar
- Kavita Lad
- Leela Chitnis
- Lalita Pawar
- Madhuri Dixit
- Madhu Sapre
- Mamta Kulkarni
- Manasi Moghe
- Manjari Phadnis
- Mayuri Kango
- Mithila Palkar
- Mrinal Kulkarni
- Mrunal Thakur
- Mugdha Godse
- Mukta Barve
- Nagma
- Namrata Shirodkar
- Nanda
- Nikki Tamboli
- Nishigandha Wad
- Nivedita Joshi
- Nutan
- Padmini Kolhapure
- Pallavi Joshi
- Priya Bapat
- Priya Tendulkar
- Radhika Apte
- Ranjana Deshmukh
- Reema Lagoo
- Renuka Shahane
- Rinku Rajguru
- Sagarika Ghatge
- Sakhi Gokhale
- Sai Tamhankar
- Saiyami Kher
- Sandhya Shantaram
- Sarika
- Shakuntala Paranjpye
- Shashikala
- Shilpa Shirodkar
- Shilpa Tulaskar
- Shobhana Samarth
- Shibani Dandekar
- Smita Patil
- Sonali Bendre
- Shraddha Kapoor
- Sonalee Kulkarni
- Sonali Kulkarni
- Sulochana
- Sharvari Wagh
- Shriya Pilgaonkar
- Supriya Pilgaonkar
- Supriya Karnik
- Sulbha Arya
- Tanuja
- Tanvi Azmi
- Tara Deshpande
- Urmila Matondkar
- Usha Kiran
- Vandana Gupte
- Varsha Usgaonkar
- Shilpa Shinde
- Vidya Malvade
- Rohini Hattangadi
- Sai Deodhar
- Shivani Surve
- Meenakshi Shirodkar
- Leena Chandavarkar
- Isha Koppikar
- Nalini Jaywant

Directors

- Abhinay Deo
- Amol Gupte
- Amol Palekar
- Anand Patwardhan
- Ashutosh Gowariker
- Bhalji Pendharkar
- Bhagwan Dada
- Baburao Mistry
- Dadasaheb Phalke
- Deepak Kadam
- Deepshikha Deshmukh
- Dinkar D. Patil
- Dadasaheb Torne
- Gauri Shinde
- Jabbar Patel
- Kunal Deshmukh
- Madhur Bhandarkar
- Master Vinayak
- Mahesh Kothare
- Mahesh Manjrekar
- N. Chandra
- Nagraj Manjule
- Nishikant Kamat
- Paresh Mokashi
- Raja Nawathe
- Raja Paranjpe
- Raja Thakur
- Sachin Kundalkar
- Sachin Pilgaonkar
- Sai Paranjpe
- Umesh Vinayak Kulkarni
- V Shantaram
- Vishram Sawant
- Vishnupant Damle
- Swapna Waghmare Joshi
- Satish Rajwade
- Anant Mane

Models and beauty pageant winners

- Aditi Gowitrikar
- Anusha Dandekar
- Madhu Sapre
- Mugdha Godse
- Rakhi Sawant
- Ujjwala Raut
- Sonali Raut
- Manasi Moghe
- Lopamudra Raut
- Namrata Shirodkar
- Meera Deosthale

Hollywood

- Aditya J Patwardhan
- Omi Vaidya
- Deep Katdare
- Shirish Korde
- Devika Bhise
- Michelle Khare
- Janina Gavankar
- Nivedita Kulkarni
- Karsh Kale

Bigg-Boss (Hindi) show winners

- Shilpa Shinde
- Tejasswi Prakash

=== Literature ===
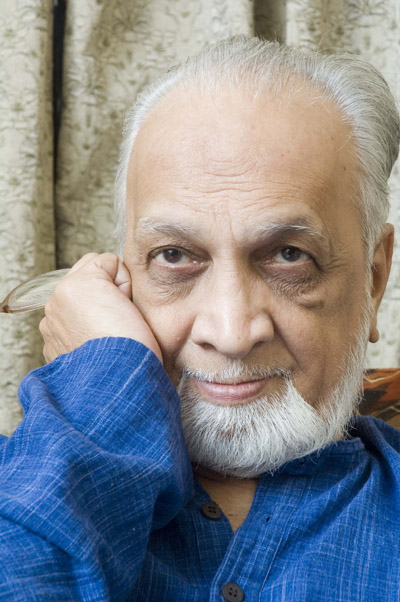
Playwright Vijay Tendulkar

Ancient Maharashtrian litterateurs

- Hāla
- Pravarasena II
- Bharavi
- Dandi
- Bhavabhuti
- Akalajalada
- Rajashekhara
- Neelakantha Chaturdhara

Jnanpith Award winners - Outstanding contribution in Indian Literature

- Vishnu Sakharam Khandekar
- Vinda Karandikar
- Ravindra Kelekar
- Bhalchandra Nemade
- Kusumagraj
- D. R. Bendre

Noted Marathi writers in non-Marathi languages

- D. R. Bendre - Considered as the greatest Kannada lyric poet of the 20th century.
- Gajanan Madhav Muktibodh - One of the pioneers of modern Hindi poetry.
- Kaloji Narayana Rao- One of the greatest Telugu poets. His birth anniversary is celebrated as Telangana Language Day
- Madhavrao Sapre - Writer and journalist in Hindi
- Madhusudan Kalelkar - Writer in Hindi cinema

Others

- Acharya Atre
- Annabhau Sathe
- Arun Kolatkar
- Arun Sadhu
- Balwant Moreshwar Purandare
- Bahinabai Chaudhari
- Bal Samant
- Dattaram Maruti Mirasdar
- Daya Pawar
- Dilip Chitre
- D. M. Mirasdar
- G. A. Kulkarni
- Gajanan Digambar Madgulkar
- Ganesh Trimbak Deshpande
- Gangadhar Gadgil
- Gopal Ganesh Agarkar
- Govind Purushottam Deshpande
- Hamid Dalwai
- Hari Narayan Apte
- Hemant Divate
- Indira Sant
- Irawati Karve
- Jaywant Dalvi
- Laxman Mane
- Madhu Limaye
- Nirja
- Madhu Mangesh Karnik
- Mahesh Elkunchwar
- Malati Bedekar
- Manya Joshi
- Manohar Malgonkar
- Mohan Samant
- Anant Kanekar
- Nagnath S. Inamdar
- Namdev Dhasal
- Narayan Gangaram Surve
- Narayan Hari Apte
- Purushottam Bhaskar Bhave
- Purushottam Laxman Deshpande
- Ram Ganesh Gadkari
- Ranjit Desai
- Ratnakar Matkari
- Sadanand Rege
- Saleel Wagh
- Sandeep Khare
- Satish Alekar
- Shanta Shelke
- Shivaji Sawant
- Shridhar Bhaskar Warnekar
- Shrikrishna Raut
- Sharmila Rege
- Suresh Bhat
- Vasant Abaji Dahake
- Vasant Purushottam Kale
- Vasant Kanetkar
- Vasudha Patil
- Vijay Tendulkar
- Vilas Sarang
- Vishnu Vaman Shirwadkar
- Vishram Bedekar
- Vishwas Patil
- Gopal Nilkanth Dandekar
- Jagdish Khebudkar
- Shakuntala Karandikar

==== Columnists and journalists ====
- Arun Sadhu
- Balshastri Jambhekar
- Raja Shamraj
- Nanasaheb Parulekar
- Waman Gopal Joshi
- Madhavrao Bagal
- Atmaram Raoji Bhat
- Yadunath Thatte
- Madhav Yeshwant Gadkari
- Govind Talwalkar
- Ganpatrao Jadhav
- Vidyadhar Gokhale
- Praful Bidwai
- Nikhil Wagle
- Anubha Bhonsle
- Uttam Kamble
- Sanjay Raut
- Rajdeep Sardesai
- Shobhaa De

==== Historians ====
- Amrit Gangar
- Anant Sadashiv Altekar
- Babasaheb Purandare
- Conjeevaram Hayavadana Rao
- D. R. Bhandarkar
- Dattatray Balwant Parasnis
- Dattatraya Ganesh Godse
- Datto Vaman Potdar
- Dinkar G. Kelkar
- Gangadhar Pathak
- Govind Sakharam Sardesai
- K. N. Dikshit
- M. N. Deshpande
- M. K. Dhavalikar
- Ninad Bedekar
- Prachi Deshpande
- Prakashchandra Pandurang Shirodkar
- Ramchandra Narayan Dandekar
- S. T. Joshi
- Sadashiv Ranade
- Sadashiv Vasantrao Gorakshkar
- Sethu Madhav Rao Pagadi
- Shridhar Venkatesh Ketkar
- Tryambak Shankar Shejwalkar
- V. S. Wakaskar
- Vasudev Vishnu Mirashi
- Vidyadhar Johrapurkar
- Vishnushastri Krushnashastri Chiplunkar
- Vishwanath Kashinath Rajwade
- Vasudeo Sitaram Bendrey

=== Other applied arts ===
Father of Indian Circus - Vishnupant Moreshwar Chatre

First Ventriloquist in Modern India - Y. K. Padhye

Father of Indian Comic Books - Anant Pai

Photographers/cinematographers

- Atul Kasbekar
- Baburao Painter
- Gautam Rajadhyaksha
- Waman Thakre
- Debu Deodhar
- Amol Gole
- Jagdish Mali
- Anna Salunke

Costume/fashion designers

- Bhanu Athaiya
- Nachiket Barve
- Anita Dongre

Production designers

- Nitin Chandrakant Desai
- Vishnupant Govind Damle

Cartoonists

- Bal Thackeray
- S. D. Phadnis
- D. G. Kulkarni
- Maya Kamath
- S. N. Gorakshakar
- Vasant Sarwate
- Raj Thackeray

Sculptors

- Valay Shende
- Ram V. Sutar
- Sadashiv Sathe
- Pramod Kamble
- Subodh Kerkar
- Vinayak Pandurang Karmarkar
- Bhalchandra Dattatray Mondhe

Painters

- Gopi Kukde
- Pratap Mullick
- S. K. Bakre
- H. A. Gade
- D. G. Kulkarni
- N. S. Bendre
- M. V. Dhurandhar
- Pralhad Anant Dhond
- M. R. Acharekar
- Shripad Damodar Satwalekar
- Amruta Patil
- Sawlaram Lakshman Haldankar
- Ketaki Pimpalkhare
- Sambhaji Kadam
- Tryambak Vasekar
- Sudhir Patwardhan
- Prafulla Dahanukar
- S. M. Pandit
- Prabha Badgelwar
- Jivya Soma Mashe
- Vasudeo S. Gaitonde
- Raghunath Krishna Phadke

Calligraphers/typographers

- Raghunath K. Joshi
- Vinay Saynekar

== Music ==
=== Hindustani classical music ===
- Ajay Pohankar
- Ajit Kadkade
- Anand Bhate
- Arati Ankalikar-Tikekar
- Ashwini Bhide-Deshpande
- Bal Gandharva
- C. R. Vyas
- Mysore Sadashiva Rao
- Hirabai Badodekar
- Jyotsna Bhole
- Jitendra Abhisheki
- Kesarbai Kerkar
- Kishori Amonkar
- Krishnarao Phulambrikar
- Kumar Gandharva
- Mahesh Kale
- Manik Varma
- Mogubai Kurdikar
- Prabha Atre
- Rahul Deshpande
- Manjusha Kulkarni-Patil
- Satish Vyas
- Sanjeev Abhyankar
- Shrikrishna Narayan Ratanjankar
- Shrinivas Khale
- Shruti Sadolikar
- Sureshbabu Mane
- Ulhas Kashalkar
- Devaki Pandit
- Uday Bhawalkar
- V. G. Jog
- Vasantrao Deshpande
- Padma Talwalkar
- Veena Sahasrabuddhe
- Vidyadhar Oke
- Vikas Kashalkar
- Vishnu Digambar Paluskar
- Vishnu Narayan Bhatkhande
- Vinayakrao Patwardhan
- K. G. Ginde
- Sumati Mutatkar
- Shounak Abhisheki
- D. V. Paluskar
- Deenanath Mangeshkar
- Bhaskarbuwa Bakhale
- Sawai Gandharva
- Dhondutai Kulkarni
- Balakrishnabuwa Ichalkaranjikar
- B. R. Deodhar
- Ramdas Kamat
- Narayanrao Vyas

=== Music directors ===
- Arun Paudwal
- Anil Mohile
- Anand Modak
- C. Ramchandra
- Datta Naik
- Datta Davjekar
- Hridaynath Mangeshkar
- Laxmikant Kudalkar
- Ram Kadam
- Ram-Laxman
- Sudhir Phadke
- Shrinivas Khale
- Shridhar Phadke
- Vasant Desai
- Vasant Prabhu
- Ashok Patki
- Govindrao Tembe
- Sneha Khanwalkar
- Yashwant Dev

=== Modern music ===
- Ajay–Atul
- Amitraj
- Ashutosh Phatak
- Avdhoot Gupte
- Ajit Parab
- AV Prafullachandra
- Digvijay Bhonsale
- Gaurav Dagaonkar
- Karsh Kale
- Kaushal Inamdar
- Milind Date
- Milind Ingle
- Nilesh Moharir
- Salil Kulkarni
- Sandeep Shirodkar
- Sneha Khanwalkar
- Rohan-Rohan
- Rahul Ranade

=== Singers ===
- Aarya Ambekar
- Adarsh Shinde
- Anupama Deshpande
- Anuradha Paudwal
- Arun Date
- Asha Bhosle
- Bela Shende
- Hema Sardesai
- Kumari Kanchan Dinkarrao Mali-Shah
- Lata Mangeshkar
- Manik Varma
- Meena Mangeshkar
- Nihira Joshi
- Sudesh Bhosle
- Prajakta Shukre
- Rahul Vaidya
- Rohit Shyam Raut
- Sadhana Sargam
- Sanjivani
- Shalmali Kholgade
- Shahir Vitthal Umap
- Sudhir Phadke
- Shridhar Phadke
- Swapnil Bandodkar
- Suresh Wadkar
- Usha Mangeshkar
- Vaishali Mhade
- Vaishali Samant
- Avadhoot Gupte
- Swanand Kirkire
- Digvijay Bhonsale

Winner of Indian Idol (Season 1)

- Abhijeet Sawant

== Sports ==
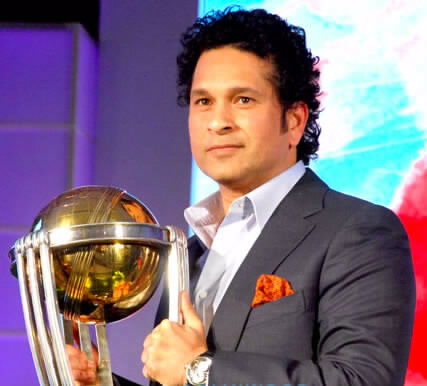
Sachin Tendulkar

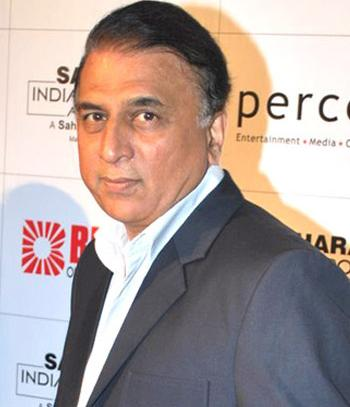
Sunil Gavaskar

First Individual Olympic Medal for India

- Khashaba Dadasaheb Jadhav

First Individual Paralympic Medal for India

- Murlikant Petkar

First Indian to score 100 international 100's

- Sachin Tendulkar

First Indian woman to cross Gobi Desert

- Sucheta Kadethankar

First Indian woman to obtain WIM title

- Jayshree Khadilkar

India's first Olympic Marathon runner

- Phadeppa Dareppa Chaugule

=== Cricket ===
- Aavishkar Salvi
- Abey Kuruvilla
- Aditya Tare
- Ajinkya Rahane
- Ajit Agarkar
- Ajit Wadekar
- Arjun Tendulkar
- Anshuman Gaekwad
- Armaan Jaffer
- Ashutosh Agashe
- Bapu Nadkarni
- Baloo Gupte
- Chandu Sarwate
- Chandrakant Pandit
- Chandrasekhar Gadkari
- Chandrakant Patankar
- Chandu Borde
- Arundhati Kirkire
- Sanjay Jagdale
- Dhawal Kulkarni
- Dattu Phadkar
- Dattaram Hindlekar
- Dilip Sardesai
- Dilip Vengsarkar
- Eknath Solkar
- Hemu Adhikari
- Hemant Kanitkar
- Hrishikesh Kanitkar
- Khandu Rangnekar
- Kiran More
- Kedar Jadhav
- Lisa Sthalekar
- Manohar Hardikar
- Mona Meshram
- Nilesh Kulkarni
- Rahul Dravid
- Paras Mhambrey
- Poonam Raut
- Pranav Dhanawade
- Pravin Amre
- Ramesh Powar
- Ramnath Parkar
- Ramakant Achrekar
- Rohan Gavaskar
- Rohit Sharma
- Ruturaj Gaikwad
- Sachin Tendulkar
- Salil Ankola
- Sameer Dighe
- Sanjay Bangar
- Subhash Gupte
- Sairaj Bahutule
- Sandeep Patil
- Shardul Thakur
- Sanjay Manjrekar
- Shubhangi Kulkarni
- Smriti Mandhana
- Surya Kumar Yadav
- Sunil Gavaskar
- Sushil Nadkarni
- Vinod Kambli
- Umesh Yadav
- Vijay Hazare
- Vijay Manjrekar
- Zaheer Khan
- Wasim Jaffer
- Pravin Tambe
- Viraj Bhosale
- Datta Gaekwad
- Shivajirao Gaekwad
- Abhijit Karambelkar
- C. R. Mohite
- Nana Joshi
- Tushar Deshpande
- Rajvardhan Hangargekar
- Darshan Nalkande
- B. B. Nimbalkar

=== Chess ===
- Abhijit Kunte
- Akshayraj Kore
- Anupama Gokhale
- Bhagyashree Thipsay
- Divya Deshmukh
- Eesha Karavade
- Jayshree Khadilkar
- Mrunalini Kunte
- Praveen Thipsay
- Rohini Khadilkar
- Ramchandra Sapre
- Shardul Gagare
- Swapnil Dhopade
- Vasanti Khadilkar
- Abhimanyu Puranik
- Vidit Gujrathi

=== Others ===
- Aditi Mutatkar – Badminton
- Anjali Bhagwat - Shooter
- Ashish Mane - Mountaineer
- Brahmanand Sankhwalkar – Footballer
- Damayanti Tambay – Badminton
- Gaurav Natekar – Tennis
- Kavita Raut – Runner
- Krushnaa Patil – Mountaineer
- Mahesh Gawli – Footballer
- Nandu M. Natekar – Badminton
- Nikhil Kanetkar – Badminton
- Rahi Sarnobat - Shooter
- Raju Gaikwad - Footballer
- Ramchandra Parab – Footballer
- Ramesh Gokhale - Bridge
- Sameer Naik – Footballer
- Tejaswini Sawant - Shooter
- Tushar Khandekar – Field hockey
- Harsha Bhogle – Commentator
- Meghana Erande - Voice artist
- Shridhar Chillal – Longest fingernails
- Savitri Khanolkar – Designer of PVC
- Arundhati Pantawane – Badminton
- Tanvi Lad – Badminton
- Sanjivani Jadhav – Runner
- Sundeep Waslekar - Strategic Foresight Group
- Jyoti Amge - Smallest women
- Bhimrao Kesarkar - Silver medalist in men's javelin at Summer Paralympics 1984
- Sangram Chougule - Bodybuilding
- Sunil Jadhav - Bodybuilding

== Outside Maharashtra ==
Bene Israel

- Eli Ben-Menachem
- Liora Itzhak
- Samson Kehimkar
- Eban Hyams
- Nissim Ezekiel
- Jerusha Jhirad
- Ezra Mir
- Leela Samson
- Reuben Dhondji Ashtumkar
- David Abraham Cheulkar

Thanjavur

- Reddy Row
- Serfoji I
- Serfoji II
- Shahuji I
- Thanjavur Subha Rao
- Tukkoji
- V. P. Madhava Rao
- N. Vittal
- Palladam Sanjiva Rao
- R. Balaji Rao
- R. Ramachandra Rao
- R. Raghunatha Rao
- Sir T. Madhava Rao
- R. Venkata Rao
- T. Ananda Rao
- T. Rama Rao
- T. Venkata Rao
- Nakul Abhyankar
- N. Madhava Rao
- T. R. Ramachandran
- Bharati Shivaji

Uttarakhand

- Govind Ballabh Pant
- K.C. Pant
- Ra'ana Liaquat Ali Khan

United Kingdom, Ireland and Europe

- Pratap Chitnis, Baron Chitnis
- Leo Varadkar - Ireland P.M
- Atul Chitnis
- Satyendra Pakhale
- Mangesh Panchal
- Arvinn Gadgil
- Sandesh Gulhane

Mexico

- Pandurang Sadashiv Khankhoje

South East and Far East

- Dwarkanath Kotnis
- Yogendra Puranik

Canada

- Natasha Mhatre

Australia

- Anusha Dandekar
- Neel Kolhatkar
- Minoti Apte
- Lisa Sthalekar

United States

- Sakharam Ganesh Pandit
- Pramod Khargonekar
- Dinesh Thakur
- Chandrashekhar Khare
- Anil Nerode
- Avinash Kamalakar Dixit
- Aravind Joshi
- Abhay Ashtekar
- Ashok Gadgil
- Shrinivas Kulkarni
- Janina Gavankar
- Nivedita Kulkarni
- Deep Katdare
- Omi Vaidya
- DJ Patil
- Karsh Kale
- Shirish Korde
- Abhi Talwalkar
- Sachin Lawande
- Srikant Datar
- Vikram Pandit
- Vivek Ranadivé
- Suhas S. Patil
- Arun G. Phadke
- S. T. Joshi
- Kumar P. Barve
- Swati Dandekar
- Kshama Sawant
- Ameya Pawar
- Ramesh Raskar
- Atul Gawande
- Sushil Nadkarni
- Nalini Nadkarni
- Devika Bhise
- Shreeram Abhyankar
- Narendra Karmarkar
- Nitin Pradhan
- Gopal H. Gaonkar
- Rahul Pandharipande
- Ajit V. Pai
- Samir Mitragotri
- Vijay Raghunath Pandharipande
- Bharti Kirchner
- Saurabh Netravalkar
- Aditya J Patwardhan
- Shya Chitaley
- Shri Thanedar
- Raj Date
- Michelle Khare

UAE

- Zulekha Daud UAE's first Woman Doctor

== Awardee ==
First Indian to receive Magsaysay Award (Asia's Nobel)

- Vinoba Bhave

Ramon Magsaysay - Asia's Noble

- Vinoba Bhave
- Pandurang Shastri Athavale
- Baba Amte
- Rajanikant Arole
- Mabelle Arole
- Prakash Amte
- Mandakini Amte
- Harish Hande

Bharat Ratna - Highest Civilian Award

- Govind Ballabh Pant
- Dhondo Keshav Karve
- Pandurang Vaman Kane
- Vinoba Bhave
- B. R. Ambedkar
- Lata Mangeshkar
- Sachin Tendulkar
- Nanaji Deshmukh

Ashok Chakra - India's highest peacetime military decoration award for valour, courageous action or self-sacrifice away from the battlefield.

- Hemant Karkare
- Vijay Salaskar
- Ashok Kamte
- Tukaram Omble
- Jagannath Raoji Chitnis
- Vijay Salaskar

Param Vir Chakra - India's highest military decoration, awarded for displaying distinguished acts of valour during wartime.

- Rama Raghoba Rane
- Ardeshir Tarapore

Victoria Cross

- Yeshwant Ghadge
- Namdeo Jadhav

Padma Vibhushan- Second Highest Civilian Award of India

- Balasaheb Gangadhar Kher
- Hari Vinayak Pataskar
- Kaka Kalelkar
- Dattatraya Shridhar Joshi
- P. B. Gajendragadkar
- C. D. Deshmukh
- Premlila Vithaldas Thackersey
- Baba Amte
- Lakshman Shastri Joshi
- Pandurang Shastri Athavale
- Nanaji Deshmukh
- Lata Mangeshkar
- Kishori Amonkar
- Jayant Narlikar
- Nirmala Deshpande
- V. N. Khare
- Asha Bhosle
- Sachin Tendulkar
- Anil Kakodkar
- Vijay Kelkar
- Raghunath Anant Mashelkar
- Sharad Pawar
- Balwant Moreshwar Purandare
- Prabha Atre
- M. F. Husain
- Arun Shridhar Vaidya
- Vasudev Kalkunte Aatre
- Rajinikanth
- Madhav Shrihari Aney
- Kaloji Narayana Rao

Shanti Swarup Bhatnagar Prize

- Prafullachandra Vishnu Sane
- Madhav Gadgil
- Jayant B. Udgaonkar
- Dinakar Mashnu Salunke
- Shekhar C. Mande
- Sanjeev Galande
- Shubha Tole
- Rajesh Sudhir Gokhale
- Raghavendra Gadagkar
- Bal Dattatreya Tilak
- Shridhar Ramachandra Gadre
- Girjesh Govil
- Pramod Sadasheo Moharir
- Janardan Ganpatrao Negi
- Shridhar Ramachandra Gadre
- Ashwin Gumaste
- Amol Arvindrao Kulkarni
- Yogesh M. Joshi
- Ashish Kishore Lele
- Vivek Ranade
- Vivek Borkar
- Jyeshtharaj Joshi
- B. D. Kulkarni
- Suhas Pandurang Sukhatme
- Raghunath Anant Mashelkar
- Kapil Hari Paranjape
- Rajeeva Laxman Karandikar
- Eknath Prabhakar Ghate
- Jayant Vishnu Narlikar
- Ramanath Cowsik
- Varun Sahni
- Atish Dabholkar
- Umesh Waghmare
- Nissim Kanekar
- Mandar Madhukar Deshmukh
- Chetan Eknath Chitnis
- Santosh G. Honavar
- Vidita Ashok Vaidya

== Criminals and Gangsters ==
- Arun Gawli, Indian gangster turned politician
- Dawood Ibrahim Kaskar, Indian crime lord and terrorist who was founder of D-company.
- Shabir Ibrahim Kaskar, Indian gangster
- Rajendra Sadashiv Nikalje (often known as Chota Rajan), Indian gangster
- Maya Dolas, Indian gangster and former member of D-company
- Manya Surve, Indian gangster
- Dilip Buwa, Indian gangster and sharpshooter
- Ravi Pujari, Indian gangster and extortionist
- Chota Shakeel, Indian gangster and lieutenant of Dawood Ibrahim.

== See also ==
- List of people from Maharashtra
- List of people from Nagpur
