= Pandharipande =

Pandharipande is an Indian surname. Notable people with the surname include:

- Rahul Pandharipande (born 1969), Indian mathematician
- Vijay Raghunath Pandharipande (1940–2006), Indian-American physicist
