= V. S. Wakaskar =

Vinayak Sadashiv Wakaskar (born 16-2-1884) was a noted Maratha and Shivaji historian from Baroda.

== Selected bibliography ==
- 91 Kalami Bakhar - Bhonsale Gharanyachi Chitravali, Venus Publications, 1930.
- Krishnaji Anant Sabhasad Bakhar - Shri Shivprabhunche charitra, Venus Publications, 1960.

== See also ==
- List of Historians
- List of historians by area of study
- List of Marathi people
- Chandraseniya Kayastha Prabhu
