= G. T. Deshpande =

Indian writer (1910–1989)

Ganesh Trimbak Deshpande
- Born: 14 August 1910; Wadnergangai, Amravati district, Bombay Presidency (now part of Maharashtra)
- Died: 18 November 1989 (aged 79)
- Occupations: scholar, academic, poet, literary critic, professor
- Awards: 1959: Sahitya Akademi Award

Academic background
- Education: Nagpur University

Academic work
- Institutions: Nagpur University, Nagpur
- Main interests: Vedas, Vedanta, Hindu philosophy

Ganesh Trimbak Deshpande (14 August 1910 – 18 November 1989), was an Indian writer, scholar and critic from Maharashtra. Deshpande has authored more than 12 classical works. He has attained international renown and recognition by his scholarly contribution to literary treasure. His Bharatiya Sahitya Shastra work published in 1958, brought him the highest national literary distinction of Sahitya Akademi Award in 1959.

== Life ==
G. T. Deshpande was born in a Deshastha Brahmin family on 14 August 1910 in Wadnergangai, a village in Amravati district of Maharashtra. Deshpande studied law after his graduation with Sanskrit as one of the subjects for Bachelor of Arts in 1934 and Master of Arts in Sanskrit in 1940 from Nagpur University. Deshpande started his career as an advocate. Deshpande taught Sanskrit and Law in Shivaji Arts College, Amravati from (1946 - 1958). He later joined Department of Sanskrit in Nagpur University as professor and worked from (1959 - 1972) and was the Head of the Department of Humanities from (1968 - 1972).

== Works ==
Deshpande has authored more than 12 classical works om Vedas, Alankarashastra, Grammar and Indian Philosophy.

- Bharatiya Sahitya Shastra. Popular Prakashan. 1958.
- Alankar Pradeep
- Sankhya Karika
- Indological papers. Vidarbha Samshodhan Mandal. 1971.
- Abhinavagupta. Sahitya Akademi Publications. 1989.
- Pre-Paninian Grammar. Popular Prakashan. 2011. ISBN 978-8171548934.
- Indian Poetics. Popular Prakashan. 2009. ISBN 978-8179912850.

== Awards and honours ==
- 1959 : Sahitya Akademi Award
- D.Litt., 1960: Nagpur University, Nagpur, India
