= Nivedita Kulkarni =

American actress

- Education: Washington University in St. Louis
- Occupations: Writer, actress, comedian
- Website: Archived 5 November 2024 at the Wayback Machine

Nivedita Kulkarni is an American actress, model, writer, and comedian. She performs regularly at the Upright Citizens Brigade Theater, and is known for appearing in Bank of America commercials.

== Career ==
After earning a degree in Econometrics from Washington University in St. Louis, Kulkarni moved to New York and began her acting career.

She was subsequently cast in a principal role in Tochi Onyebuchi's film Lippizaners, which released in 2013.

Kulkarni also wrote 2 articles for Huffington Post about herself, titled "The Craft of Acting" and the review for her play "How I Died".

In 2024, speaking with the Gothamist, she talked about her struggling her career despite the ongoing strikes and how her 2014 organization Nuva helps women in the entertainment industry find jobs. That year, Nuva had meetups with around 30 women every few weeks to find jobs. She started trading cryptocurrency to make money.

== Filmography ==
Film
Year	Title	Role	Notes
2012	Lippizaners	Maggie	
2015	East of Main Street	Self	Documentary
2016	Swapped American Psycho	Claire McDermott	Short film

Television
Year	Title	Role	Network	Notes
2008	Desi States of America	Day Player		Also writer
2009	Royal Pains	Wedding Guest	USA Network	
2012	The Untitled Web Series That Morgan Evans is Doing	Party Girl	MTV	
2013	I'd Kill For You	Joan Conner	Discovery ID	
2013	Redrum	Ms. Patel	Discovery ID	

Stage
Year	Title	Role	Notes
2009	Sex Lives of Disney Princesses	Pocahontas	Upright Citizens Brigade Theatre (August 2009 – November 2009)
2009	Samsara	Suraiya	Dramatists Guild
2013	Parking Space	Lucille	Producers Club
2013	Women Of The Wild West	The Squaw	Producers Club
2014	How I Died	Sanya Patel	Strawberry One-Act Festival

== Recognition ==
- The Kilroys (2017) for Nuva Comedy/Asian American Script Lab (Founder/CEO)
