= Ram Ingole =

Indian social worker

- Occupation: Social worker
- Organization(s): Amrapali Utkarsh Sangh; Vimalashram Gharkul; Navin Desai Residential School
- Known for: Rehabilitation of sex-workers and their children; Rehabilitation of orphans; Education of children of migrant quarry workers
- Awards: Bade Dilwale Award; Literacy Hero Award; Nashikrao Tirpude Lifetime Achievement Award; Lokmata Swayamsevi Sanstha Puraskar (for Vimalashram Gharkul); Rashtrasant Tukadoji Maharaj Jeevan Sadhana Award

Ram Ingole is an Indian social worker based in Nagpur, Maharashtra.

== Career ==
Ingole works to rehabilitate sex-workers and their children in Nagpur. He founded an NGO called Amrapali Utkarsh Sangh in 1993. Today, some of the rehabilitated children have gone on to become lawyers and engineers.

Ingole runs an orphanage called Vimalashram Gharkul in Nagpur.

Ingole runs Navin Desai Residential School near Nagpur which provides free education to children of migrant quarry workers.

== Awards ==
- Ingole received the Bade Dilwale Award in 2013 and the Literacy Hero Award in 2017.
- Ingole was awarded the Nashikrao Tirpude Lifetime Achievement Award in 2024.
- Ingole received the Lokmata Swayamsevi Sanstha Puraskar on behalf of Vimlashram Gharkul in 2019.
- Ingole has also been felicitated by the Nagpur Municipal Corporation.
- Ingole has received the Rashtrasant Tukadoji Maharaj Jeevan Sadhana Award.
