= Reuben Dhondji Ashtumkar =

Indian soldier and revolutionary against British rule

Reuben Dhondji Ashtumkar (c. 1820 – 1899) was a Bene Israel soldier who fought in the Indian Rebellion of 1857.

== Biography ==
Born near Bombay, India, Ashtumkar entered military service in the Eighth Regiment native infantry on March 5, 1839. He participated in the pursuit of the rebel army under Tantia Tope in Gujarat, 1857–58. He was present at the engagement of Hykullze, and served with a field force against the Niakara Bheels in the Rewa Kanta district in 1857–58. He served in the Sind campaign in 1842, including the march to Kandahar. He was also in Abyssinia.

Ashtumkar was appointed jemadar on January 1, 1856; subedar on June 7, 1858; and was raised to the rank of subedar-major January 1, 1870. He was decorated with the Order of British India of the second class, with the title of bahadur on October 27, 1872, and the same order of the first class with the title of sirdar bahadur from January 1, 1877.
