= Jagannath Raoji Chitnis =

Lieutenant Colonel Jagannath Raoji Chitnis AC
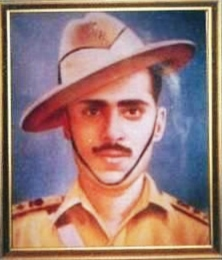
- Portrait of Lt Col J.R. Chitnis
- Born: 20 August 1918; Satara, Maharashtra, India
- Died: 14 June 1956 (aged 37); Nagaland, India
- Military career
- Allegiance: India
- Branch: Indian Army
- Service years: 1942–1956
- Rank: Lieutenant Colonel
- Service number: IC-3472
- Unit: 3 Gorkha Rifles
- Awards: Ashoka Chakra

Lieutenant Colonel Jagannath Raoji Chitnis, AC (20 August 1918 – 14 June 1956) was an Indian Army officer in 3 Gorkha Rifles who was posthumously awarded India's highest peacetime military decoration Ashoka Chakra.

== Early life ==
Lieutenant Colonel Jagannath Raoji Chitnis was born on 20 August 1918 in Satara, Maharashtra. He was the son of Sri Raoji Gopal Chitnis.

== Military career ==
Lt Col Chitnis was commissioned into the Third Battalion of the Gorkha Rifles (then part of the British Indian Army) on 12 April 1942. After passing out from OTS Bangalore, Lt Col Chitnis served with his unit in different operational areas and evolved into an experienced and battle-hardened soldier.

By 1956, Lt Col Chitnis had put in about 14 years of service and had been promoted to the rank of a Lt Col. In 1956, he had become commanding officer of 1/3 Gorkha Rifles (since Independence, part of the Indian Army) and was serving in the northeastern border of the country.

== Naga Hills attack ==
During 1956, Lt Col Jagannath Raoji Chitnis was posted in Nagaland as Commanding Officer of 1/3 Gorkha Rifles. On 14 June 1956, Lt Col Chitnis accompanied by Subedar Major Nain Singh was heading towards Zunhebeto from Mokokchung with a treasury chest containing the pay of the battalion. There was a convoy of eight jeeps with a platoon as escort. On nearing the 21st km milestone, around 100 Naga rebels belonging to Gen Kaito Sema's Federal Army opened fire on the middle jeep of the convoy. These rebels were heavily armed with LMGs (Light Machine Guns), sten guns and rifles. The sudden attack resulted in three of the jeeps getting isolated.

Lt Col Chitnis quickly assessed the situation and halted the other five jeeps. He along with four of his soldiers had already sustained injuries in the ensuing gunfire. After quickly assembling his troops, he arranged for covering the incessant firing. Leading from the front and backed by his platoon, he began moving towards the militants’ position amidst ongoing gunfire. About 150 yards short of the rebels’ bunkers, Lt Col Chitnis ordered a counter-attack despite being wounded in the leg. He forged ahead undeterred and attacked the rebels with a bayonet, killing one and injuring another. Thereafter when an LMG opened fire on his party from a flank, he again led a bayonet charge against the LMG post and got critically injured in the stomach. Because of his injuries, he collapsed 15 yards from the rebel bunker but continued to motivate and guide his platoon to the rebel positions.

Lt Col Chitnis died of his injuries, but his troops succeeded in destroying the rebel camp, resulting in 20 rebels killed.

== Ashoka Chakra awardee ==
Lt Col Jagannath Raoji Chitnis, on account of his extraordinary courage, exemplary leadership and unparalleled devotion to duty was awarded India's highest gallantry peacetime award, “ Ashok Chakra”. Lt Col J S Chitnis is survived by his son Captain Nandu Chitnis, Master Mariner with the Shipping Corporation of India.
