= Amit Prabhakar Maydeo =

Indian gastroenterologist

- Born: Girgaon, Mumbai, India
- Occupation: Gastroenterologist
- Awards: Padma Shri

Amit Prabhakar Maydeo is an Indian gastroenterologist and endoscopy expert known for his pioneering efforts on therapeutic endoscopy and endoscopic retrograde cholangiopancreatography (ERCP). In 2013, he was honoured by the Government of India with the Padma Shri, the fourth highest civilian award, for his contributions to the fields of medicine and medical education. His son, Dr. Rohan Maydeo, is a surgeon from MGM Medical College and Hospital, Aurangabad.

== Biography ==
Suddenly, I feel a big burden on my shoulders.But at the same time, I also feel that my responsibility towards those needing medical care has increased, said Dr. Maydeo on hearing about the Padma Shri award.

Amit Prabhakar Maydeo was born in a family with meagre financial resources in Girgaon, a southern Mumbai area in the western Indian state of Maharashtra. After graduating in medicine, his initial specialization was in surgery, but an internship at a German Hospital introduced him to the minimally invasive technique of endoscopy.

Maydeo is credited with the establishment of the first endoscopic centre in India, Baldota Institute of Digestive Sciences, considered as the most modern gastroenterology and endoscopic centre in India where he works in the capacity of the Director. Reports credit him with introducing the concept of endoscopy in India and starting the first educational course on the topic. He is also reported to have done path breaking work on therapeutic endoscopy and endoscopic retrograde cholangiopancreatography (ERCP). His researches have also been quoted to have developed new protocols in the treatment of pancreatic and common bile duct (CBD) stones.

Amit Maydeo, a recipient of the civilian award of Padma Shri, lives along the Bhulabhai Desai Road, popularly known as Breach Candy, in Mumbai.

== Positions ==
Amit Prabhakar Maydeo, a former President of the Society of Gastrointestinal Endoscopy of India, is the Managing Director of the Institute of Advanced Endoscopy, he also holds positions of prominence such as:

- Director - Baldota Institute of Digestive Sciences, Global Hospital, Mumbai
- Consultant, Gastroenterologist - Breach Candy Hospital, Mumbai
- Honorary Consultant Gastroenterologist - Jaslok Hospital, Mumbai
- Consultant Gastroenterologist - Prince Aly Khan Hospital, Mumbai

Maydeo is also connected with two firms, Elcom Instruments Industries and Centre for Digestive and Kidney Diseases India, in the capacity of the Director.

== See also ==
- Endoscopic retrograde cholangiopancreatography
