= Valay Shende =

- Born: 15 September 1980 (age 45); Nagpur, India
- Education: Govt. Chitrakala Mahavidyalaya, Nagpur. Sir Jamsetjee Jeejebhoy School of Art Mumbai University
- Occupations: Contemporary artist and sculptor
- Website: www.valayshende.com

Valay Shende (15 September 1980, Nagpur, Maharashtra, India) is a sculptor and artist. In 1999 he received his diploma in Art Teaching from Govt. Chitrakala Mahavidyalaya, Nagpur, and then he went on to train at the Sir Jamsetjee Jeejebhoy School of Art, Mumbai, from which he graduated with a Bachelor of Fine Arts in sculpturing in 2004. Shende later completed an artist residency at the Open 'Air' Program, Point Éphémère, Paris in 2006.His latest exhibition, Migrating Histories of Molecular Identities, shows artwork that represent situations through "the deconstruction of matter in the form of molecular discs of metal and portraits". His work has been exhibited in Mumbai at the Dr. Bhau Daji Lad Museum, and various other cities. Shende's work has been featured in The Daily Telegraph.

== Career ==
As a multimedia artist, Valay Shende, works with the mediums of sculpture, photography, video and installation. His works aim to create a "language that communicates beyond borders to act as a contribution of knowledge and references of our histories and present times to future generations". In 2011, Shende installed a large-scale truck installation, entitled TRANSIT, at the Musée d'art contemporain de Lyon (Lyon Museum of contemporary Art) in France.

== Selected exhibitions ==
=== Selected Solo Exhibitions ===
- 2019 ‘Marriott, Champs Elysees', Curated by Opera Gallery, Paris.
- 2019 ‘Spirit Of Bombay', Palladium Mumbai.
- 2015 ‘From Day to Day’, Opera Gallery, Paris
- 2015 ‘Migrating Histories of Molecular Identities’, special project at Dr. Bhau Daji Lad Museum, Mumbai
- 2009 'Indian Encounters', Kashya Hildebrand, Zurich
- 2009 'Recent Works by Valay Shende', Sakshi Gallery, Mumbai
- 2007 'Recent Works by Valay Shende', Sakshi Gallery, Mumbai

=== Group Shows on Artsy ===
- 28 May - 11 June 2020 - "Sculptures", Opera Gallery Dubai
- 13–28 December 2019 - Masters and Contemporary, Opera Gallery Miami
- 05 - 19 October 2017 - Gold, Opera Gallery Paris

=== Fair History on Artsy ===
- India Art Fair, New Delhi, 2019
- Giving Back to Nature, Opera Gallery Beirut, 17 May - 3 June 2017
- Opera Gallery at Art Central Opera Gallery, 2017
- The Public House of Art at Art Aspen 2017, The Public House of Art, 2017
- Grand Opening: Miami Design District, Opera Gallery, Miami, USA 2016
- 19 June - 9 July 2015 - Candyland, Opera Gallery Hong Kong

Exhibition	Type	Museum	City	Year
"Migrating Histories of Molecular Identities"	solo	Dr. Bhau Daji Lad Museum	Mumbai, India	2013
"Recognition System" (Kuandu Biennale)	group	Kuandu Museum of Fine Arts	Taipei, Taiwan	2014
"Indian Highway"	group	MAXXI	Rome, Italy	2011
"Indian Encounters"	solo	Galerie Kashya Hildebrand	Zürich, Switzerland	2009
"Recent Works by Valay Shende"	solo	Sakshi Gallery	Mumbai, India	2009
"Still Moving Image"	group	Devi Art Foundation	Gurgaon, India	2008
"Recent Works by Valay Shende"	solo	Sakshi Gallery	Mumbai, India	2007
"Bombay Maximum City"	group	Lille 3000	Lille, France	2006
"Between Myth and History" (Indian Video Art)	group	Tate Modern	London, UK	2006
"Indian video Art: History in Motion"	group	Fukuoka Art Museum	Fukuoka, Japan	2004
"Seni, Art & Contemporary"	group	Singapore Art Museum	Singapore	2004
"I Love My India"	group	Total Museum of Contemporary Art	Seoul, South Korea	2003
"Move on Asia"	group	Alternative Space LOOP	Seoul, South Korea	2003
