= B.G. Matapurkar =

Indian scientist and poet

Balkrishan Ganpatrao MatapurkarHindi: डा. बालक्रिशन गणपतराव मातापुरकर is an Indian medical researcher and multi-lingual poet. He first defined the term "organ regeneration" and was awarded a US patent on adult stem cells used for organ regeneration.

== Works ==
- Salhan, Sudha (August 2011). Textbook of Gynecology. JP Medical Ltd. p. 625. ISBN 978-93-5025-369-4.
- Bharadwaj, Aditya; Glasner, Peter E. (2009). Local Cells, Global Science: The Rise of Embryonic Stem Cell Research in India. Taylor & Francis. ISBN 978-0-415-39609-7.
