= Nanasaheb Parulekar =

Indian newspaper editor (1898-1973)

- Born: 20 September 1897
- Died: 8 January 1973 (aged 75)
- Occupation: Journalist
- Spouse: Shanta Genevieve Pommeret
- Children: 1 daughter

Narayan Bhikaji Parulekar, commonly referred as Nanasaheb Parulekar (20 September 1897 – 8 January 1973), was the founding editor of Sakal, a Marathi daily newspaper, launched in January 1932. He also remained the chairman of the Press Trust of India.

Today, Sakal is the flagship daily of Pune-based Sakal Media Group, which also runs newspapers including Sakaal Times and Gomantak, and sells almost 300,000 copies in Pune district and over 1,000,000 copies across Maharashtra.

Parulekar was a recipient of the civilian honour of the Padma Bhushan.

== Personal life ==
He was married to a Frenchwoman Shanta Genevieve Pommeret and had daughter Claude Lila Parulekar, a noted animal rights activist.
