= Mandar Madhukar Deshmukh =

Indian physicist (born 1974)

- Born: 1974 (age 51–52)
- Education: B.Tech. Indian Institute of Technology, Bombay; Ph.D. Cornell University; Postdoctoral fellow Harvard University
- Awards: Shanti Swarup Bhatnagar Prize for Science and Technology; B. M. Birla Science Prize in Physics; IBM Faculty Award
- Scientific career
- Fields: nanoscale and mesoscopic physics
- Workplaces: Tata Institute of Fundamental Research
- Doctoral advisor: Prof. D. C. Ralph

Mandar Madhukar Deshmukh (born 1974) is an Indian physicist specialising in nanoscale and mesoscopic physics at the Tata Institute of Fundamental Research, Mumbai. He was awarded the Shanti Swarup Bhatnagar Prize for Science and Technology in 2015, the highest science award in India, in the physical sciences category. He is an alumnus of Jnana Prabodhini Prashala in Pune. He obtained BTech degree from Indian Institute of Technology Bombay in 1996 and PhD degree from Cornell University under the guidance of D.C. Ralph in 2002. Before coming to Tata Institute of Fundamental Research, he was a postdoctoral researcher in the group of Hongkun Park at Harvard University.

== Personal life ==
His wife Prita Pant also Ph.D. from Cornell University is an associate professor at IIT Bombay.
