= Vinay Saynekar =

Indian calligrapher

Vinay Saynekar is a type designer, calligrapher and a design educator. He completed his graduation from Sir J.J. Institute of Applied Art, Mumbai University and joined a paper company, Chimanlal’s Pvt Ltd, as Chief Design Consultant in 1981. He worked for some time and then returned to his college to teach and has been a teacher of typography and calligraphy in JJ since 1984. He has taken several lectures in various Art and Design Colleges, on typefaces and their design. He also visited West Germany, the Netherlands and Great Britain for the same purpose in 1988.

He participated in a group show called ‘3 Calligraphers’.

He is a member of Aksharaya – an organisation for the 'Letter Conscious' People.

He wrote a book for calligraphy enthusiasts – Aksharsaundarya: Nirmiti ani Itihas (Beautifying Letters: Creation and History). He has organized workshops for children to introduce them to the world of calligraphy.

== Designed fonts ==
In his association with the typographer Prof R K Joshi, he designed fonts for Microsoft Corporation including Tunga for Kannada script and Vrinda for Bengali script.

He was a member of the Font Design Team in the Centre for Development of Advanced Computing (CDAC) for almost 15 years from 1992–2007. He has been a part of font designs in Devanagari, Assamese, Bengali, and Kannada. The fonts made for Linux are Jan Marathi, Jan Bengali and Jan Kannada.

His recent works include typefaces designed in Bengali and Kannada Script for Vodafone and Virgin Mobile ads in Indian regions.
