= Manaji Rao Scindia =

Maharaja of Gwalior from 1764 to 1768

5th Maharaja of Gwalior
- Reign: 10 July 1764 – 18 January 1768
- Predecessor: Kadarji Rao Scindia
- Successor: Mahadaji Shinde
- Died: 1800
- House: Scindia
- Religion: Hinduism

Manaji Rao Scindia, popularly known as Manaji Phakde, was the legitimate heir of the eldest branch of the House of Scindia, but was passed over by Madhavrao I, who appointed his brother Mahadaji Shinde to succeed.

In 1780, he joined forces with the Chhatrapati of Kolhapur against the Peshwa government.

Manaji Rao Scindia Scindia Dynasty Born: ? Died: af.1777
Regnal titles
Preceded by Kadarji Rao Scindia	Maharaja of Gwalior; 1764–1768	Succeeded by Mahadaji Scindia
