= Malati Shendge =

Indian indologist

Malati J. Shendge (1934–2015) was an Indologist. She received her Ph.D. in Buddhism from the University of Delhi. She had been a fellow of the Indian Council of Historical Research, and of the Indian Institute of Advanced Study, Shimla. She was a faculty member at Jawaharlal Nehru University, and Founder Director (Hon.) of the Rang Datta Wadekar Centre for the study of Indian Tradition, Pune.

== Theories ==
Shendge has written a number of books on the connections between the Indus Valley Civilization and Vedic culture. Her early work, The Civilized Demons, reinterprets the heavenly battle between the Asuras and the Devas described in the Rigveda as a historical record of an earthly war in the Indus Valley between the Asuras (identified by her as being the Assyrian people) already living in the valley as the Harappan Civilization, and the invading Devas (identified by her with the Aryans). Her 1997 book The Language of the Harappans extends this theory by claiming that the unknown Harappan language was the Akkadian language of Mesopotamia, and that Sanskrit is a descendant of Akkadian. In Unsealing the Indus Script (2009) she purports to decode the Indus script based on this theory.

== Books ==
- (1977) The Civilized Demons: the Harappans in Rig Veda
- (1989) Rigveda: The Original Meaning and its Recovery
- (1993) Indian Historiography and Ethnolingustic [sic] History
- (1996) The Aryas: Facts Without Fancy and Fiction. Abhinav. ISBN 9788170173182
- (1995) Songs and Ruins: Rigveda in Harappan Setting
- (1997) The Language of the Harappans: From Akkadian to Sanskrit. Abhinav. ISBN 81-7017-325-6
- (2004) Sat-Sashastrika Hevajratika
- (2009) Unsealing the Indus Script: Anatomy of its Decipherment
- (2009) Buddhahood in this Body: Japanese Esoteric Buddhism (Shin-gon) in Context
