= Sadanand Rege =

Indian poet

Sadanand Shantaram Rege
- Selected Writings of Sadanand Rege, Edited by Vasant Abaji Dahake, Publisher Sahitya Akademi, 1996/2010/2013
- Born: 21 June 1923; Rajapur, Ratnagiri, Maharashtra, India
- Died: 21 September 1982 (aged 59); Mumbai, India
- Education: M.A. English, 1961
- Alma mater: University of Mumbai
- Occupations: College teacher, Poet, Dramatist, Short-story writer, Translator, Cartoonist, Painter
- Known for: Modern poetry in Marathi
- Awards: Government of Maharashtra, Soviet Land Nehru Award

Sadanand Rege (21 June 1923 – 21 September 1982) was a Marathi poet, playwright, short-story writer, translator, cartoonist and painter. He was born in Rajapur, Ratnagiri, Maharashtra.

During his lifetime, his twenty eight books were published. His three books of poetry won government of Maharashtra award for literary achievements. His translation of Vladimir Mayakovsky's poems into Marathi: 'Pant Ghatlela Dhag' won him Soviet Land Nehru Award.

He was a trained painter and even held two exhibitions of his paintings in Norway where he was traveling.

He taught at Ramnarain Ruia College from 1962 until his death in 1982. Earlier he held a number of jobs including a stint in Indian Railways as a clerk.

== Published works ==
=== Poetry ===
- Aksharvel, 1950
- Gandharva, 1960
- Devapudhcha Diva, 1965
- Brankushicha Pakshi, 1980
- Vedya Kavita, 1980

=== Plays ===
See 'Translations' below

=== Short story collections ===
- Jeevanachi Vastre, 1952
- Kalokhachi Pise, 1954
- Chandane, 1959
- Chandra Savali Korato, 1963
- Masa aani Itar Vilakshan Katha, 1965
- Sadanand Rege: Nivadak Katha: Sampadak: Arvind Gokhale, 1988

=== Translations into Marathi ===
- Midia, Popular Prakashan, 1993 ISBN 9788171856688 ISBN 8171856683 (Marathi translation of Euripides's Medea (play))
- Pach Diwas, Popular Prakashan, 1991 ISBN 9788171852598 ISBN 8171852599 (Marathi translation of Henry Zeiger's play 'Five Days', 1965)
- Pant Ghatlela Dhag, 1971 (Marathi translation of Vladimir Mayakovsky)
- Trunparne, 1982 (Marathi translation of Walt Whitman)
- Jayketu, 1959 Original Writer Sophocles
- Brand, 1963 Original Writer Henrik Ibsen
- Badshah, 1965 Original Writer Eugene O'Neill
- Jyanche Hote Praktan Shapit, 1965 Original Writer Eugene O'Neill
- Gochi, 1974 Original Writer Tadeusz Różewicz
- Raja Idipas, 1977 Original Writer Sophocles
- Chandra Dhalala, 1947 Original Writer John Steinbeck
- Moti, 1950 Original Writer John Steinbeck
- Band, 1958 Original Writer George Orwell
- Tambade Tattu, 1962 Original Writer John Steinbeck
- Chandrotsav, 1966 Original Writer Bette Bao Lord
- Saseholpat, 1968 Original Writer Lin Yutang
