= N. R. Pathak =

Indian politician

Dr N. R. Pathak
- Eminent Doctor and ex-MLA from Miraj
- Born: September 30, 1915; Wai, Satara District, Maharashtra, India
- Died: November 30, 1985; Miraj, Maharashtra, India

Dr Narsinha Ramchandra Pathak (30 September 1915 - 30 November 1985) was a medical doctor, social worker and MLA from Miraj, India. He is the founder of Pathak Trust, Miraj which carries charitable activity in Miraj mainly in the form of an orphanage, and an old-age home.

== Biography ==
=== Early days ===
Pathak was born in Wai of Satara District. His father, Ramchandra Pathak, was a police officer of the erstwhile princely state of Miraj. He was the youngest of three brothers. His early life was tough and was ridden with poverty. He lost his eldest brother and father at an early age when he was just eighteen. He studied at Miraj High School and Willingdon College. Later when he joined Miraj Medical School with sponsorship from then Raja of Miraj H.H. shri. Balasaheb Patwardhan. In 1942 he got married. He got immense support from his mother Sitabai, brother Bhausaheb ( Bhausaheb was personal secretary to Raja and later Chief Police Inspector of Miraj State) and wife Mrs Vimaltai in all his works.

=== Inspiration ===
When he was posted at The Wanless Hospital in Miraj he saw the plight of helpless orphan children. The very fact that if people come from miles away and serve the poor and needy then why the local people cannot inspired him to start something for the orphan children. He accepted the first orphan baby on 2nd Oct 1948 thus the orphanage was started. Soon the number of children grew. Till 1970 all the expenses of orphanage were done personally by him. In order to meet the growing needs donations were required and Government grant was necessary hence the Pathak Trust was established in 1969.

=== Medical career ===
After his training he joined Karnataka Health Institute, at Ghataprabha and worked under guidance of Dr Kokatnoor as Medical Officer. Then he returned to Miraj to work as medical officer in the Miraj State run Hospital. He established his own Pathak Hospital in Miraj in 1947. He was a very bright surgeon. He carried out many a surgery during his career that included a variety from cataracts to laparotomies to orthopedic surgeries and on occasions rare operations like drainage of brain abscess. He was very careful about the poor class. He operated many patients for free even paid their expenses for travel back home after discharge. For 18 years from 1952 to 1970 he carried out cataract operations free of cost at his hospital in Month of May as charity. He trained many aspiring doctors and nurses at his hospital. He started a sanatorium for patients of tuberculosis and also was pivotal in starting local branch of the Red Cross society.

=== Political career ===
Miraj constituency was a neglected area during his time. He was very passionate for poor and raised the voice for oppressed people of Miraj and the eastern parts (Miraj Purva Bhaag). As his popularity grew people insisted that he stand for election, hence he contested 1968 assembly election but lost by a narrow margin. But next time in 1972 he was elected with a majority and it was really noteworthy as he fought this elections solely on public support without joining any political party. He served as member of local assembly for Miraj constituency from 1972-77. He had a major heart attack during the Nagpur assembly session in 1975 and retired from active politics after his tenure was over. He did many useful works for people of his constituency.

=== Personal information ===
He later on became a member of the local assembly of Maharashtra from Miraj constituency in 1972. He also started an orphanage, and a shelter for women. He traveled extensively all over the world. He was interested in agriculture and tried many experiments himself. He died on 30 November 1985 of a heart attack at Miraj.
