= Shivlinga Shivacharya =

Lingayat Saint and Social Reformer

Shivling Shivacharya Maharaj (1916-2020), also known as Rashtrasant, was a freedom fighter from Ahmedpur, Latur.

He was involved in the Quit India movement of 1942.

== Education ==
He was an MBBS graduate from 1945 and studied at the Warud Pathshala in Solapur. He also studied at the Lahore University.

== College founding ==
He founded the Dr. Shivling Shivacharya Maharaj Pratishthan's College of Education, established by D.B. Lohare in 2008. The college is approved by NCTE and Permanently Affiliated to Swami Ramanand Teerth Marathawada University Nanded.

== Death ==
He died on September 1, 2020 at the age of 104 after being treated for respiratory issues at a private hospital in Nanded for four days.
