= Sachin Lawande =

American businessman

- Born: Sachin S. Lawande; 1966 or 1967 (age 59–60)
- Education: Bombay University; Southern Illinois University
- Occupation: Businessman
- Title: CEO, Visteon
- Term: June 2015-

Sachin S. Lawande (born 1966/67) is an Indian American businessman, the president and CEO of Visteon, a Fortune 500 American automotive electronics company, since June 2015.

== Early life ==
Lawande earned a bachelor's degree in electronics and telecommunications from Goa Engineering College in India, and a master's degree in electrical engineering from Southern Illinois University at Edwardsville in the USA.

== Career ==
Lawande joined Harman International Industries in 2006. From 2011 to 2013, Lawande was co-president of Harman's lifestyle and infotainment divisions. From 2013 to 2015, Lawande was executive vice president and president of Harman's infotainment division.

Lawande has been president and CEO of Visteon since June 2015.

In March 2020, Lawande purchased US$251,000 of Visteon stock, at $50.25 per share.
