= Amol Arvindrao Kulkarni =

Indian research scientist

- Education: Institute of Chemical Technology
- Awards: Shanti Swarup Bhatnagar Prize for Science and Technology (2020)
- Scientific career
- Fields: Chemical Engineering
- Workplaces: National Chemical Laboratory

Amol Arvindrao Kulkarni (born 1976) is an Indian research scientist at National Chemical Laboratory, Pune. He earned his PhD from the Institute of Chemical Technology, Mumbai in chemical engineering. His research expertise includes design and development of microreactors.

He helped with the establishment of the first-of-its-kind microreactor laboratory in India. He has also successfully developed the first-ever scalable continuous process for silver nanowires.

He has been awarded the prestigious Shanti Swarup Bhatnagar Prize for Science and Technology, one of the highest Indian science awards for his contributions to Engineering Sciences in 2020. He has also been a research fellow at Massachusetts Institute of Technology (MIT), USA in 2010. He is also been young associate of the Indian Academy of Sciences (2011–14).

== Awards and honors ==
- Asian Scientist 100, Asian Scientist (2021)
- VASVIK award for ‘Chemical Sciences & Technology’ (2016)
- CSIR Young Scientist Award (2011)
- AV Rama Rao Chair Professor
- INSA Young Scientist Award (2009)
- Humboldt Fellow (2004)

== Selected bibliography ==
=== Articles ===
- Sharma, Brijesh M.; Atapalkar, Ranjit S.; Kulkarni, Amol A. (2019). "Continuous flow solvent free organic synthesis involving solids (reactants/products) using a screw reactor". Green Chemistry. 21 (20): 5639–5646. doi:10.1039/C9GC02447F. S2CID 202871091.
- Sharma, Mrityunjay K.; Potdar, Shital B.; Kulkarni, Amol A. (January 2017). "Pinched tube flow reactor: Hydrodynamics and suitability for exothermic multiphase reactions". AIChE Journal. 63 (1): 358–365. doi:10.1002/aic.15498.
- Sebastian Cabeza, Victor; Kuhn, Simon; Kulkarni, Amol A.; Jensen, Klavs F. (May 2012). "Size-Controlled Flow Synthesis of Gold Nanoparticles Using a Segmented Flow Microfluidic Platform". Langmuir. 28 (17): 7007–7013. doi:10.1021/la205131e. hdl:10261/369816. PMID 22475028.

=== Patents ===
- Continuous Flow Process For The Preparation Of Sulphoxide Compounds (2012)
