= Ashwin Gumaste =

Indian computer engineer

- Education: University of Texas, Dallas
- Known for: Work on Carrier Ethernet switch routers and SDN
- Awards: 2010 DAE-SRC Outstanding Research Investigator Award; 2012 DOS Hari Om Prerit Vikram Sarabhai Award; 2013 DST Swarnajayanti Fellowship; 2016 NASI-Reliance Industries Platinum Jubilee award; 2010 INAE Young Engineer Award; 2012 Vikram Sarabhai Research Award; 2013 IBM Faculty Award; 2018 Shanti Swarup Bhatnagar Prize; 2018 Fellow, INAE; 2024 Fellow, NASI
- Scientific career
- Fields: Computer network; Telecommunication
- Workplaces: Fujitsu Network Communications; Cisco Systems; IIT Bombay; Massachusetts Institute of Technology
- Doctoral advisor: Imrich Chlamtac

Ashwin Gumaste is an Indian computer engineer/AI Architect and a former institute chair professor at the department of computer science and engineering of the Indian Institute of Technology, Bombay. He is known for his work on Carrier Ethernet Switch routers—the largest technology transfer between any IIT and industry and more recently on network verification. He is a Fellow of the INAE and the NASI.

Ashwin Gumaste, started his career with Fujitsu Laboratories of America in Richardson Tx, USA, as a member of research staff (2001–05), and held positions at Fujitsu Network Communications and Cisco Systems. Prior to his current appointment Gumaste has also served as the James R. Isaac Chair Assistant professor at IITB before holding the institute chair associate professorship of the institution. He also held positions as a visiting scientist at Massachusetts Institute of Technology at their research laboratory for electronics (Claude-E-Shannon group). Ashwin Gumaste holds 28 US patents.

Ashwin Gumaste has published 200+ peer-reviewed research articles in journals and conference proceedings, He has also published three books, viz. DWDM Network Designs and Engineering Solutions, First Mile Access Networks and Enabling Technologies and Broadband services : business models and technologies for community networks.

Ashwin Gumaste, is also a recipient of the Dept of Science and Tech Swaranajayanti fellowship , and has received honors such as DAE-SRC Outstanding Research Investigator Award (2010), the Young Engineer Award of the Indian National Academy of Engineering (2010), the Vikram Sarabhai Research Award (2012) and the IBM Faculty Award (2012).

The Council of Scientific and Industrial Research, the apex agency of the Government of India for scientific research, awarded him the Shanti Swarup Bhatnagar Prize for Science and Technology, one of the highest Indian science awards, for his contributions to engineering sciences in 2018.

The Supreme Court of India appointed Ashwin Gumaste on the Technical Committee for investigating the use of malware Pegasus in 2021. The committee was chaired by Retd Justice Raveendran.

== Developed products and technologies ==
The Carrier Ethernet Switch Router (CESR) developed by Gumaste in and his team in 2011 and was transferred to PSU ECIL. The CESRs are a family of three products - a table-top switch with 4x1G and 8FE ports, a metro edge device with data-center capability, and a core router with 96 Gbit/s cross-connect capability. One of the salient features of the CESRs was a 1-microsecond port-to-port latency across layer 0–3. The CESRs were also developed as a carrier-class technology. The CESRs have been widely deployed, such as in service providers and data-centers. In the year 2018, Gumaste and his team developed a terabit SDN router in collaboration with ANURAG DRDO.

== Selected bibliography ==
=== Books ===
- Ashwin Gumaste; Tony Antony (2003). DWDM Network Designs and Engineering Solutions. Cisco Press. ISBN 978-1-58705-074-9.
- Ashwin Gumaste; Tony Antony (2004). First Mile Access Networks and Enabling Technologies. Cisco Press. ISBN 978-1-58705-129-6.
- Chlamtac, Imrich; Gumaste, Ashwin; Szabo, Csaba (2005). Broadband services : business models and technologies for community networks. Chichester: John Wiley. ISBN 0470022485. OCLC 85820660.

=== Articles ===
- Gumaste, Ashwin; Bidkar, Sarvesh; Sharma, Sidharth; Kushwaha, Aniruddha; Das, Tamal; Ghodasara, Puneet; Hote, Saurabh (1 August 2017). "Developing and Deploying a Carrier-Class SDN-Centric Network Management System for a Tier 1 Service Provider Network". Journal of Optical Communications and Networking. 9 (8): 711–729. doi:10.1364/JOCN.9.000711. ISSN 1943-0639. S2CID 42962660.
- Bidkar, S.; Mehta, R.; Singh, T.; Gumaste, A. (2014). "On the Design, Implementation, Analysis, and Prototyping of a 1-μs, Energy-Efficient, Carrier-Class Optical-Ethernet Switch Router". Journal of Lightwave Technology. 32 (17): 3043–3060. Bibcode:2014JLwT...32.3043B. doi:10.1109/JLT.2014.2336374. S2CID 19639954.
- Gumaste, A.; Das, T.; Mathew, A.; Somani, A. (2011). "An Autonomic Virtual Topology Design and Two-Stage Scheduling Algorithm for Light-trail WDM Networks". Journal of Optical Communications and Networking. 3 (4): 372–389. doi:10.1364/JOCN.3.000372. S2CID 16139629.
- Gumaste, A.; Kushwaha, A.; Bheri, B.; Das, T.; Wang, J. (2016). "On the Unprecedented Scalability of the FISSION (Flexible Interconnection of Scalable Systems Integrated using Optical Networks) Datacenter". Journal of Lightwave Technology. 34 (21): 5074–5091. Bibcode:2016JLwT...34.5074G. doi:10.1109/JLT.2016.2581319. S2CID 13159296.
- Gumaste, Ashwin; Das, Tamal; Kushwaha, Aniruddha (19 March 2017). "Does it Make Sense to put Optics in Both the Front and Backplane of a Large Data-Center?". Optical Fiber Communication Conference. Optical Society of America. pp. M3K.3. doi:10.1364/OFC.2017.M3K.3. ISBN 978-1-943580-23-1. S2CID 38843358.

== See also ==
- Access network
- Broadband
- Telecommunications
- Software-defined networking
