= Uday Salunkhe =

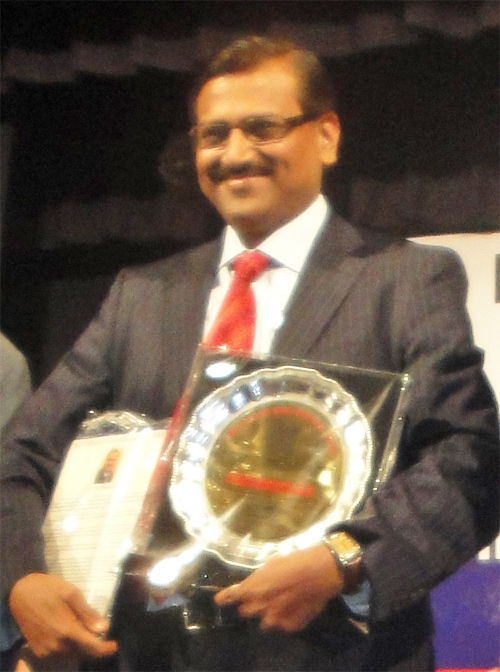
- Dr. Uday Salunkhe receiving award at 12th Annual Convention on Leadership
- Born: 19 January 1966 (age 60)
- Education: Shardhashram, Mumbai; MMS, Welingkar Institute of Management Development & Research, Mumbai; PhD Turn Around Strategies for Sick Units, University of Pune
- Occupations: Professor and academician

Dr. Uday Salunkhe is the director of the Welingkar Institute of Management Development & Research, Mumbai and Bangalore. He is the chairman of Ad Hoc Board of Studies in Management Courses of Mumbai University and Chairman of the Local Management Committee of Association of Management Development Institutions in South Asia (AMDISA) – a SAARC initiative. He took over as the President of Association of Indian Management Schools (AIMS) for year 2007–2008. AIMS is the 2nd largest body of management schools in the world with more than 500 member. His work is strongly influenced by the likes of Jack Welch and Arya Chanakya.

== Education and career ==
Uday Salunkhe is a mechanical engineer with a management degree in 'Operations', and a Doctorate in 'Turnaround Strategies'. Salunkhe has to his credit several years of experience in the corporate world including Mahindra & Mahindra, ISPL and other companies before joining Welingkar in 1995 as faculty for Production Management. Salunkhe joined Welingkar in 1995 as a Professor and was appointed as director of the Welingkar Institute in the year 2000. He guided many notable management graduates like Meghana Pandit, Tito Adicula, Ritesh Deore, Bhavesh Jain to name a few

== Affiliations ==
Salunkhe has been invited as visiting fellow at the Harvard Business School, US and European University, Germany. He has also delivered seminars at the Asian Institute of Management, Manila. He served as the President of Association of Indian Management Schools (AIMS), the second largest network of management schools in the world. He is currently the President of the National HRD Network (NHRDN), Mumbai Chapter. He was also appointed one of the independent directors of Datamatics.

== Achievements ==
The Welingkar Institute of Management has recently been conferred "Autonomous Status for its University programs".from 2015-2020 under the leadership of Group Director Prof Dr Uday Salunkhe. He was conferred the "Grand Davos Award" at the World Communication Forum, Davos 2014, for tremendous contribution and lifelong dedication to the field of business communication in India and the region. Salunkhe was conferred with the Prestigious Eisenhower Fellowship in 2012. He is a recipient of the Ravi J. Mathai National Fellow Award conferred by the Association of Indian Management Schools for his exemplary contribution to India Inc. and society at large, in the fields of applied management and education

The 12th Annual Convention on Leadership has conferred the 'Prof. Dharni Sinha Memorial Award for Excellence in Management Education' to Salunkhe. This award recognises his excellence and contribution to management education. Welingkar Institute of Management was ranked 7th in West India and 16th in India's Top 50 Business Schools by the Hindustan Times Best B Schools in India Survey 2010. Under Salunkhe's visionary leadership, Welingkar Institute has been ranked 8th in the private B-School category by Outlook in the B-School Survey 2008, 3rd in Student Exchange Program category, 7th in Faculty Exchange Program category and 16th in Top 50 B-Schools category.

The institute was honoured with the Dewang Mehta Business Award, 2008 in the following categories: Business School which encourages innovations that lead to better development, Business School Leadership Award, Business School with Best Academic Input (Syllabus) in Marketing and Retail/Services. The award is in recognition of leadership, development, innovation and industry interface of business schools. The Dewang Mehta Business Award recognises talent and leadership amongst the Business Schools across India. This institute has received JJ Irani Award as a Best Management Institute, in September 2006. He has initiated several international partnerships with universities across the globe to facilitate faculty & student exchange programs, study internships in the United States, United Kingdom, Sweden, France etc. Salunkhe has also been involved in the official bodies of the university and the Directorate of Technical Education to improve the quality of management education. The Economic Times in February 2011 did a story on how students from non-IIM institutes like Welingkar are receiving prestigious offers from companies in finance and IT sector. Salunkhe was quoted as saying, "India Inc is back on its feet. Sectors like IT, ITeS and finance are getting a lot of international business, which is creating opportunities for students."
