= Vijay Raghunath Pandharipande =

Indian-American physicist

Vijay Raghunath Pandharipande (August 7, 1940 – January 3, 2006) was an Indian-American physicist, who played a leading role in the development of the nuclear many-body problem.

== Biography ==
Pandharipande obtained his bachelor's and master's degree from Nagpur University in 1959 and 1961 respectively. He earned his PhD degree from University of Bombay in 1969.

After working at Niels Bohr Institute and Cornell University, Pandharipande joined the University of Illinois at Urbana-Champaign in 1972, becoming a faculty member there in the next year. He became a full professor in 1977 and stayed there the rest of his life.

In recognition of his fundamental contributions to determining the structure of light nuclei by solving the Schrödinger problem with more than three nucleons using realistic nucleon-nucleon interactions supplemented by three-body forces, Pandharipande was awarded the prestigious Tom W. Bonner Prize in Nuclear Physics of the American Physical Society in 1999.

His son, Rahul Pandharipande is a leading mathematician working on algebraic geometry.
