= List of battles involving the Maratha Empire =

This is a list of the battles involving the Maratha Empire, from the Maratha Rebellion under Shivaji to its dissolution in 1818.

Battle	Date	Allies	Enemies	Contemporary Location	Result
Shivaji's rebellion against the Bijapur Sultanate
Battle of Pratapgarh	10 November 1659	Marathas	Bijapur	Pratapgarh, Bijapur	Victory
Battle of Pavan Khind	22 September 1660	Marathas	Bijapur	Vishalgad, Bijapur	Inconclusive
Battle of Panhala	mid 1660–22 September 1660	Marathas	Bijapur	Panhala, Bijapur	Defeat
Siege of Ponda (1666)	January 1666	Marathas	Bijapur	Ponda, Bijapur	Defeat
Maratha insurgency against the Mughal Empire
Battle of Chakan	23 June – 14 August 1660	Marathas	Mughal Empire	Chakan, Mughal Empire	Defeat
Battle of Surat	5 January 1664	Marathas	Mughal Empire	Surat, Mughal Empire	Victory
Battle of Purandar	31 March – 12 June 1665	Marathas	Mughal Empire	Purandar, Mughal Empire	Defeat
Battle of Sinhagad	4 February 1670	Marathas	Mughal Empire	Sinhagad Fort, Mughal Empire	Victory
Battle of Salher	February 1672	Marathas	Mughal Empire	Salher, Mughal Empire	Victory
Battle of Bhupalgarh	7 February – 2 April 1679	Maratha Kingdom	Mughal Empire	Bhupalgarh, Mughal Empire	Defeat
Battle of Kalyan	1682–1684	Maratha Kingdom	Mughal Empire	Kalyan, Mughal Empire	Defeat
Battle of Ramsej	April 1682–1688	Maratha Kingdom	Mughal Empire	Ramsej, Maratha Kingdom	Defeat
Battle of Wai	December 1687	Maratha Kingdom	Mughal Empire	Wai, Mughal Empire	Victory
Siege of Panhala (1701)	January – 28 May 1701	Maratha Kingdom	Mughal Empire	Panhala,	Defeat
Mughal Civil War (Sayyid brothers)
Battle of Balapur	19 June – 31 July 1720	Mughal Empire (Sayyid faction) • Sayyid Brothers • Maratha Kingdom • Rohilkhand • Bundi State	Mughal Empire • Emperor Shah Alam I • Viceroyalty of the Deccan	Balapur, Mughal Empire	Defeat
Battle of Bundelkhand
Battle of Jaitpur	1728-29	Maratha Confederacy	Mughal Empire	Jaitpur, Panna State	Victory
Maratha–Nizam Wars
Battle of Bhopal	24 December 1737	Maratha Confederacy	Mughal Empire	Bhopal, Mughal Empire	Victory
Battle of Palkhed	28 February 1728	Maratha Confederacy	Hyderabad Deccan	Palkhed, Hyderabad Deccan	Victory
Maratha-Rajput Wars
Battle of Pilsud	1715	Maratha Confederacy	Kingdom of Amber	Pilsud, Kingdom of Amber	Defeat
Battle of Mandsaur	1732	Maratha Confederacy	Kingdom of Amber	Mandsaur, Kingdom of Amber	Victory
Battle of Kakkor	1759	Maratha Confederacy	Kingdom of Amber	Kakkor, Kingdom of Amber	Defeat
Maratha invasions of Bengal
First Maratha invasion of Bengal	April – September 1742	Maratha Confederacy: Kingdom of Nagpur	Bengal Subah	Bengal, Odisha	Defeat
Battle of Katwa (1742)	27 September 1742	Maratha Confederacy: Kingdom of Nagpur	Bengal Subah	Katwa, Bengal Subah	Defeat
Second Maratha invasion of Bengal	March – May 1743	Maratha Confederacy: Kingdom of Nagpur	Bengal Subah; Maratha Confederacy under Peshwa Balaji Baji Rao	Bengal, Bihar and Odisha	Defeat
Third Maratha invasion of Bengal	March 1744	Maratha Confederacy: Kingdom of Nagpur	Bengal Subah	Bengal, Bengal Subah	Defeat
Fourth Maratha invasion of Bengal	February 1745 – March 1747	Maratha Confederacy: Kingdom of Nagpur	Bengal Subah	Bengal, Bihar, Odisha	Inconclusive
Siege of Barabati (1745)	March – 6/12 May 1745	Maratha Confederacy: Kingdom of Nagpur	Bengal Subah	Barabati Fort, Cuttack, Odisa, Bengal Subah	Victory
Battle of Naubatpur (1745)	14–21 December 1745	Maratha Confederacy: Kingdom of Nagpur	Bengal Subah	Naubatpur, Bihar, Bengal Subah	Defeat
Battle of Bhagalpur (1745)	November/December 1745	Maratha Confederacy: Kingdom of Nagpur	Bengal Subah	Bhagalpur, Bihar, Bengal Subah	Defeat
Battle of Rani Sarai	16 April 1748	Maratha Confederacy: Kingdom of Nagpur Afghan rebels	Bengal Subah	Rani Sarai, near Barh, Bihar	Defeat
Siege of Cuttack (1749)	May – June 1749	Maratha Confederacy: Kingdom of Nagpur	Bengal Subah	Cuttack, Odisha, Bengal Subah	Inconclusive
Maratha–Jat Wars
Battle of Kumher	1754	Mughal Empire • Maratha Confederacy • Kingdom of Jaipur	Kingdom of Bharatpur	Kumher, Bharatpur	Defeat
Afghan–Maratha War
Battle of Delhi	1757	Mughal Empire • Maratha Confederacy	Afghanistan • Rohilkhand	Delhi, Mughal Empire	Victory
Battle of Narela	1757	Maratha Confederacy	Afghanistan	Narela, Durrani Empire	Defeat
Battle of Taraori (1759)	1759	Maratha Confederacy	Afghanistan	Taraori, Durrani Empire	Defeat
Battle of Barari Ghat	1760	Maratha Confederacy	Afghanistan	Barari Ghat, Durrani Empire	Defeat
Battle of Sikandarabad	1760	Maratha Confederacy	Afghanistan	Sikandarabad, Durrani Empire	Defeat
Battle of Kunjpura	1760	Maratha Confederacy	Afghanistan	Kunjpura, Durrani Empire	victory
Battle of Samalkha (1760)	1760	Maratha Confederacy	Afghanistan	Samalkha, Durrani Empire	Defeat
Battle of Meerut (1760)	1760	Maratha Confederacy	Afghanistan	Meerut, Durrani Empire	Defeat
Battle of Panipat	1761	Mughal Empire • Maratha Confederacy	Afghan Empire • Rohilkhand • Amb State • Khanate of Kalat • Kingdom of Awadh	Panipat, Mughal Empire	Defeat
Maratha-Nizam War
Battle of Rakshasbhuvan	1763	Maratha Confederacy	Hyderabad Deccan	Rakshasbhuvan, Maratha Confederacy	Victory
Battle of Kharda	March 1795	Maratha Confederacy	Hyderabad Deccan	Kharda, State of Hyderabad	Victory
First Maratha-Mysore War
Maratha-Rohillakhand War
Battle of Delhi	1771	Mughal Empire • Maratha Confederacy	Rohilkhand	Delhi, Mughal Empire	Victory
Second Maratha-Mysore War
Battle of Saunshi	1777	Maratha Confederacy	Mysore	Saunshi, Mysore Kingdom	Defeat
First Battle of Nargund	1778	Maratha Confederacy	Mysore	Nargund, Maratha Confederacy	Defeat
Second Battle of Nargund	1785	Maratha Confederacy	Mysore	Nargund, Mysore Kingdom	Defeat
Battle of Adoni	1786	Maratha Confederacy	Mysore	Adoni, Maratha Confederacy	Defeat
Battle of Savanur	1786	Maratha Confederacy	Mysore	Savanur, Maratha Confederacy	Defeat
Maratha-Rajput Wars
Battle of Patan	1790	Gwalior State	Kingdom of Amber; Marwar	Patan, Amber	Victory
Battle of Merta	1790	Gwalior State; Indore State	Marwar	Merta, Marwar	Victory
Battle of Fatehpur	1799	Gwalior State; Indore State	Amber	Merta, Amber	Defeat
Battle of Malpura	1800	Gwalior State; Indore State	Amber; Marwar	Malpur, Amber	Victory
