= Battle of Kunjpura =

Part of the Maratha-Afghan Wars in 1760

- Part of Afghan-Maratha War
Date	17 October 1760
Location	Kunjpura, Haryana
Result	Maratha victory

Belligerents
Maratha Empire	Durrani Empire; Kingdom of Rohilkhand

Commanders and leaders
Sadashiv Rao Bhau; Ibrahim Khan Gardi; Mahadaji Scindia; Jankoji Rao Scindia; Malharrao Holkar	Najabat Khan (DOW); Abdus Samad Khan †; Momin Khan †; Mian Qutb Shah (executed)

Strength
Unknown	Unknown

Casualties and losses
Unknown	20,000

The Battle of Kunjpura was fought on 17 October 1760, and it was a significant engagement during the Maratha-Afghan Wars. It was led by the prominent Maratha commander Bhau, and marched towards Kunjpura, approximately 150 kilometers north of Delhi, due to high floods preventing the transportation of supplies from the Panjab, particularly from Sirhind. This was a significant temptation for Bhau to embark on the journey.

== Battle ==
Bhau, the Maratha leader, traveled approximately 150 kilometers north of Delhi to Kunjpura due to high floods preventing the transportation of supplies from the Panjab, particularly from Sarhind. This was a significant attraction for Bhau to embark on the journey. Bhau arrived in Kunjpura on 16 October. Najabat Khan, the governor of Kunjpura, had arranged two lines of defense outside and inside the town's walls. Sardar Abdus Samad Khan Muhammadzai, the governor of Sarhind, and Qutab Shah Rohilla, a religious preceptor of Najib, led 5,000 men outside the walls. Inside the walls, Najabat Khan commanded 10,000 Afghans. The Marathas encircled them during the night and attacked in the morning on 17 October. Both Afghan commanders fought valiantly, but Ibrahim Khan Gardi's artillery heavily bombarded them. Abdus Samad was killed, and Qutab Shah was injured. The remaining Afghans and Rohillas forced Najabat Khan to open a gate to let them in. The Marathas also rushed in simultaneously. The town and fort were immediately taken over. Qutab Shah was brutally tortured to death for his previous act of beheading Dattaji. Najabat Khan died due to his injuries. His two sons were apprehended and perished during the Panipat campaign. His third son Daler Khan managed to escape and succeeded his father later on. The Marathas seized an enormous amount of loot, including 64 lakhs of rupees in cash, two lakh maunds of wheat and other provisions, 3,000 horses, many camels, numerous guns, and an abundance of ammunition.

== See also ==
- Third Battle of Panipat
