= Battle of Samalkha =

Maratha-Durrani Empire War of 1760

- Part of Afghan-Maratha War
Date	26 October 1760
Location	Samalkha, India
Result	Durrani victory

Belligerents
Durrani Empire	Maratha Empire

Commanders and leaders
Ahmad Shah Durrani Rao Jeta Gujar Atai Khan	Govind Pant Bundela

Strength
Unknown	5,000 Cavalry

Casualties and losses
1,000+ killed	2,000+ killed

The Battle of Samalkha was a skirmish that took place between two rival forces in the Samalkha district of Haryana. It occurred in 1760 and involved the Afghan army, led by Ahmad Shah Durrani, and the Maratha army, led by Govind Pant Bundela. This battle was a part of the Third Battle of Panipat, and resulted in severe destruction for the Maratha forces.

== Background ==
The Maratha forces were unable to prevent Ahmad Shah Durrani from crossing the Yamuna River. Ahmad Shah successfully crossed the river and set up a defensive camp near Panipat. The Marathas had planned to block Ahmad Shah's access back to Afghanistan. They sent Govind Pant Bundela with five thousand cavalry to halt further Afghan advances.

== Battle ==
On the afternoon of October 26, Ahmad Shah's advance guard reached Samalkha, about halfway between Sonipat and Panipat, where they encountered the vanguard of the Marathas. A fierce skirmish ensued, in which the Afghans lost 1,000 men but forced the Marathas back to their main body, resulting in the slaughter of over 2,000 Marathas, who continued to retreat slowly for several days.

== Aftermath ==
Najib ad-Dawlah was dispatched by Ahmad Shah to prevent Maratha supplies flowing in from Delhi, defeating the forces of Naro Shankar, the Maratha governor of Delhi. Sadashivrao in response sent Govind Pant Bundela to invade Rohilla territories and cut off Afghan supplies. Marching with 12,000 horsemen, the Maratha detachment advanced up to Meerut before being attacked by an Afghan contingent of 14,000 dispatched by Ahmad Shah on 17 December under Atai Khan. Bundela was killed and the Maratha force was routed, with large amounts of supplies being seized by the Afghans. In later encounters, Bundela, together with 10,000 informally trained cavalry who were not officially enlisted as soldiers, was involved in a foraging mission with around 500 men. They were ambushed by an Afghan force near Meerut, resulting in a clash in which Pant Bundela was killed by Atai Khan.

== Sources ==
- Gupta, Hari Ram (1978) [1937]. History of the Sikhs: Evolution of Sikh Confederacies (1707-1769) (3rd ed.). Munshiram Motilal Publishers. p. 85. ISBN 978-8121502481.
- Sarkar, Sir Jadunath (1971). 1754-1771 (Panipat). 3d ed. 1966, 1971 printing. Orient Longman. pp. 89–90.
- Singh, Ganda (1959). Ahmad Shah Durrani, father of modern Afghanistan. Asia Publishing House.
