= Padargad =

Fort in Raigad district, India

Padargad Fort
- Part of Sahyadri Hill Range
- Raigad district, Maharashtra

Site information
- Type: Hill fort
- Owner: IndiaGovernment of India
- Controlled by: Maratha Empire (1739-1818); United Kingdom: East India Company (1818-1857); British Raj (1857-1947); India (1947-)
- Open to the public: Yes
- Condition: Ruins

Location
- Shown within Maharashtra
- Coordinates: 19°03′09″N 73°31′21.7″E
- Height: 4490 Ft.

Site history
- Materials: Stone

Padargad is a small fort used for vigilance in the past. is situated to the east of Karjat in the Indian state of Maharashtra. It is on the Bhimashanker trek route in the Karjat area, because of its height and difficult climbing, it is not visited by most of the trekkers.

== History ==
Little history is known about the fort. The locals say that it is not a fort but a sort of lighthouse from where the directions were given to know the advancements of the enemy through the Ganapati Ghat road. It can be called a watch tower to keep a vigil on the Mawal area in the greater province of the Maratha. Records say that this fort along with Tungi fort was constructed by Aurangjeb while capturing the Kothaligad Fort.

== How to reach ==
The base village is Khandas which is 31 km from Karjat. Karjat is well connected by road and railway from Mumbai and Pune

== Trekking path ==
The starting point for the trek is Khandas village. The path to the Ganpati ghat leads to the small hamlet Padarwadi. From Padarwadi a narrow path to the south leads to the pinnacle of Padargad. The climb is somewhat difficult and only professional trekkers with proper equipment attempt the climb. The narrow climbing path to the top of the fort is locally called chimney.

== Places to visit ==
There is a large cave and few dried up water cut cisterns on the fort. The narrow pinnacle is called Kalavantins pinnacle.

== See also ==
- List of forts in Maharashtra
- Marathi People
- List of Maratha dynasties and states
- Maratha War of Independence
- Battles involving the Maratha Empire
- Maratha Army
- Maratha titles
- Military history of India
