= Najabat Khan =

Afghan chief and warrior (18th century)

Najabat Khan ( † 17 October 1760) was an Afghan warrior of the 18th century, and founder of a line of chiefs of Kunjpura which he was granted by Nader Shah in 1739 and the titlehood "Nawab". Najabat Khan was killed during the Battle of Kunjpura at his fort on 17 October 1760 by the Maratha Army led by Ibrahim Khan Gardi during preparations for the Third Battle of Panipat.

== Early life ==
Najabat Khan was born in the region of Ghorghushti in the Chach plains northeast of Attock, in the area along the upper parts of the Indo-Gangetic Plain that correspond to what is just nearby to the Hazara region. Having left the valley, he set out to the eastern parts of the Indo-Gangetic Plain to seek his fortunes. Najabat Khan entered into the service of the Mughal governor of Punjab, who was then Zakariya Khan, until he was made an imperial commander within the Mughal Army and obtained a tract in Karnal. During the decisive Battle of Karnal, he betrayed the Mughals and aided Nader Shah during his invasion of Delhi, and was therefore recognized as Nawab of Karnal by Nader Shah.

== Kunjpura chiefdom ==
In 1748 he obtained a sanad from the Durrani Padishāh Ahmad Shah Abdali, (Note: also known as Durr-e-Durran [Durrānī] 'Pearl of Pearls') who was then in the height of his power in Northern India, granting him a "hereditary jagir" of 149 villages. The villages were declared to be inam, or revenue-free, and he was to enjoy thenceforth the revenue payable to the Imperial Government, subject to the obligation of maintaining order in his ilaqa or possessions. These villages were in Karnal district, and it was from this base that he fought more battles against the Rajput Hill Rajas. In 1729 he founded Kunjpura and built a fort there. The fort was renowned for its strength and strategic position. He became a nawab after winning the respect of the Imperial leadership in Delhi.

In the early to mid 18th century, the Maratha Empire became the primary power in the Indian subcontinent. Afghan conqueror Ahmad Shah Abdali invaded north and northwestern India. Small regional powers asked for help from Abdali against the armies of Marathas, who occupied Mughal areas following the death of Aurangzeb. Nawāb Najābat Khān joined the army of Ahmad Shah Durrani and was killed before the Third Battle of Panipat in the Battle of Kunjpura, in which the Marathas stormed and defeated the Afghan garrison commanded by Najabat Khan who fell valiantly. The garrison at Kunjpura was separated on a different bank from the main Afghan force swollen by rainy conditions. Ahmad Shāh Abdāli was enraged by this and ordered an immediate crossing of the river at all costs beginning the Third Battle of Panipat resulting in the defeat and annihilation of 100,000 Marathas and the subsequent decline of Maratha power in northern India.

His son Dater Khan was a faithful chief of Ahmad Shah Durrani. He received a grant of 150 villages from the Shah in the parganahs of Bidauli, Indri, Karnal, Shahabad and Thanesar. He died in 1773 and was succeeded by his next son Gulsher Khan.

His direct descendants had embroiled in very costly legal disputes over inheritance issues - these were ultimately settled by the British colonial judiciary during the period of Crown control in India. After the partition of India, the last Nawab of Kunjpura, Nawab Ibrahim Ali Khan, migrated to Lahore in Pakistan, and died in 1953.

The Salarkhēl tribe claim to be descended from Nawab Najabat Khan through his elder brother Zabita Khan. It is stated in Tareekh-e-Kunjpura he was of the Jadoon or Kakar tribe. Nawab Najabat Khan's elder brother Zabita Khan returned to Ghorghushti without claim to any of endowment from the land in Kunjpura. Zabita Khan's descendants now live in the town of Ghorghushti. The ancestral home in Mohalla Ishaq Zai is still owned by the descendants of Nawab Najabat Khan's brother, which has attracted well-wishers from Kunjpura, Lahore, Karachi.

There is a mention of Nawab Najabat Khan in the Imperial Gazetteer of India V.16 that his community in India were considered Ghorghushti Pathans, who in Karnal, were assimilated in all their social observances with their neighbouring Hindustani Pathans, and are generally classed as "Hindustanis" although they are of Salarkhel Pashtun origin.
