= Battle of Meerut =

- Part of Afghan-Maratha War
Date	17 December 1760
Location	Meerut, Maratha Empire 28.98°N 77.71°E
Result	Durrani Empire victory

Belligerents
Durrani Empire	Maratha Empire

Commanders and leaders
Ahmad Shah Durrani; Atai Khan Rao Jeta Gujar.	Govind Pant Bundela †

Strength
14,000 cavalry	12,000 cavalry

Casualties and losses
Unknown	2,000 soldiers killed 20,000 slain at camp (Total 22,000)

The Battle of Meerut was a military skirmish initiated by Emperor Ahmed Shah Durrani in an attempt to capture Govind Pant Bundela, who had taken refuge in Meerut. Emperor Ahmad Shah dispatched Atai Khan with a small army of Afghans to Meerut. Bundela was ready to face the Afghan forces with his light cavalry of ten thousand soldiers, and a fierce battle ensued between the two adversaries in Meerut.

== Background ==
On the afternoon of the 26th of October, a significant battle erupted in Samalkha. The Afghan forces were under the direct command of the emperor, while the Marathas were led by Govind Pant Bundela. The Afghans were victorious in the battle, prompting Bundela to be executed. After the confrontation, Bundela escaped and sought refuge in Meerut, saving his life. Subsequently, the emperor deployed Atai Khan, along with the elite cavalry, to apprehend Bundela in Meerut.

== Battle ==
Najib ad-Dawlah was dispatched by Ahmad Shah to prevent Maratha supplies flowing in from Delhi, defeating the forces of Naro Shankar, the Maratha governor of Delhi. Sadashivrao Bhau in response sent Govind Pant Bundela to invade Rohilla territories and cut off Afghan supplies. Marching with 12,000 horsemen, the Maratha detachment advanced up to Meerut before being attacked by an Afghan contingent of 14,000 dispatched by Ahmad Shah on 17 December under Atai Khan. Govind Pant was killed and the Maratha force was routed, with large amounts of supplies being seized by the Afghans. In later encounters, Bundela, together with 10,000 informally trained cavalry who were not officially enlisted as soldiers, was involved in a foraging mission with around 500 men. They were ambushed by an Afghan force near Meerut, resulting in a clash in which Bundela was killed by Atai Khan. This was further aggravated by the loss of a detachment of 2,000 Maratha troops who had left Delhi on a mission to transport funds and provisions to Panipat.

== Aftermath ==
The passing of Govind Pant Bundela greatly distressed Sadashivrao Bhau. He mourned the loss of around 22,000 inhabitants within the Maratha Empire. Subsequently, the Maratha armies confronted Afghan forces at the battlefield of Panipat, resulting in a historical defeat.

== Bibliography ==
- Gupta, Hari Ram (1978). History of the Sikhs: Evolution of Sikh Confederacies, 1708-1769. Munshiram Manoharlal.
- Sarkar, Sir Jadunath (1971). Fall of the Mughal Empire: Volume 2, 1754-1771 (Panipat) (3rd; 1966, 1971 printing ed.). Orient Longman.
- Singh, Ganda (1959). Ahmad Shah Durrani: Father of Modern Afghanistan. Asia Publishing House.
