= Mir Haibat Khan Tanoli =

- Nawab; Dewan of Hazara

5th Dewan of Hazara of Kingdom of Amb
- Reign: 1783–1798
- Successor: Mir Nawab Khan Tanoli
- Born: 6 April 1740; Amb
- Died: 12 December 1798; Darband, Khyber Pakhtunkhwa
- Burial: 1798; Darband, Khyber Pakhtunkhwa
Names
- Mir Haibat Khan Tanoli
- Dynasty: Tanoli
- Father: Gul Muhammad Khan Tanoli
- Religion: Sunni Islam

Mir Haibat Khan Tanoli was the maternal cousin of Suba Khan Tanoli and the military chief or Wazir-e-Azam (Prime Minister) of Suba Khan Tanoli. He supported Suba Khan in Third Battle of Panipat and fought against the Hindu Jats and Sikh. After the death of Suba Khan Tanoli, he became the ruler and chief of Tanawal controlled by loya jirga in Tanoli Tribe. This created many rebellions inside the tribe. One son of Haibat khan, Hashim khan Tanoli, was killed by the son of Suba Khan Tanoli.
