= Kothaligad =

Fort in Raigad district, Maharashtra, India

Kothaligad/ Peth Fort
- Part of Sahyadri Hill Range
- Raigad district, Maharashtra
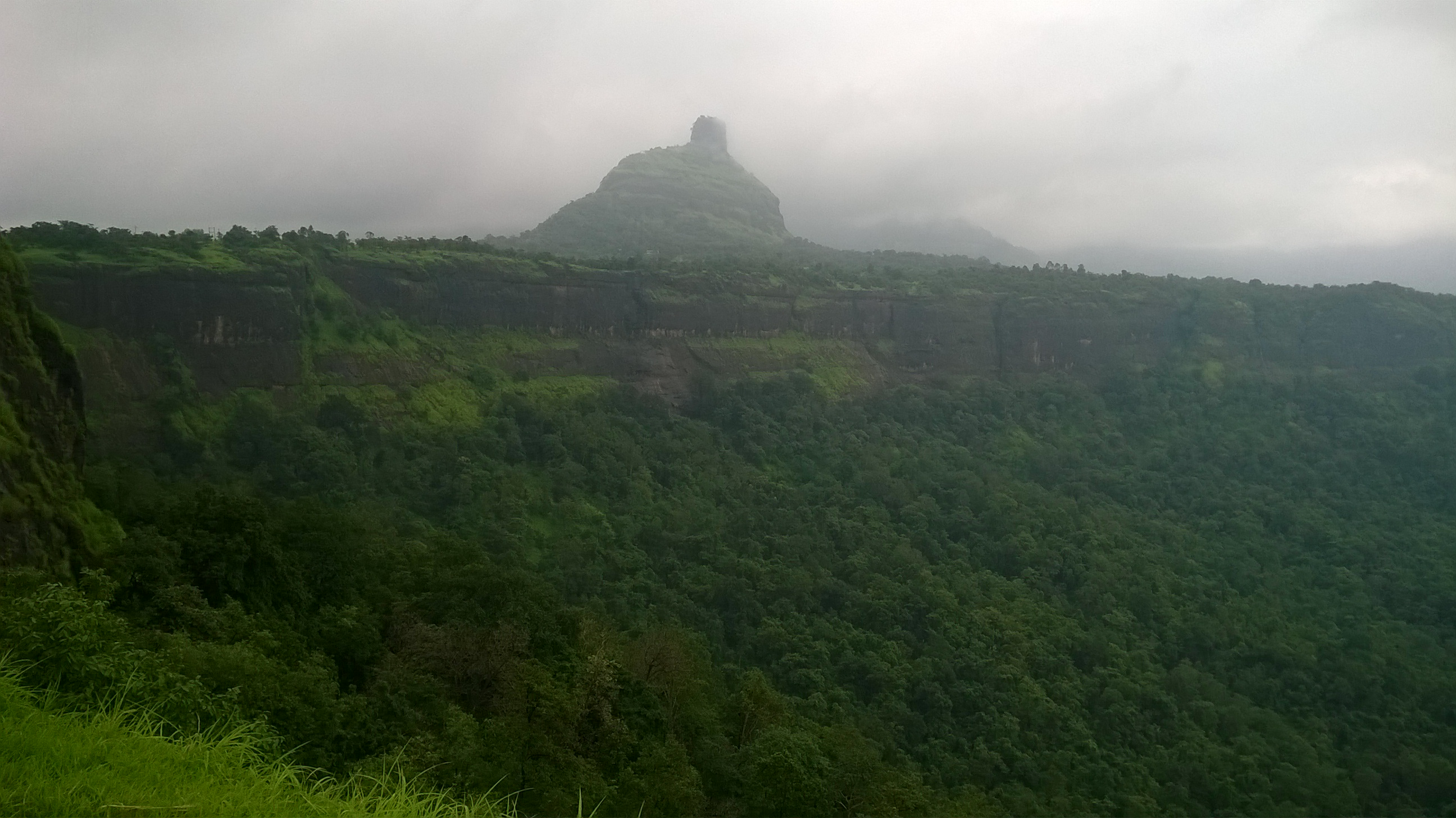
- Kothaligad fort

Site information
- Type: Hill fort
- Owner: Government of India
- Controlled by: Ahmadnagar (1521-1594); Portugal (1594); Maratha Empire (1739–1818); United Kingdom: East India Company (1818–1857); British Raj (1857–1947); India (1947–present)
- Open to the public: Yes
- Condition: Ruins

Location
- Shown within Maharashtra
- Coordinates: 18°59′32.3″N 73°30′45.6″E
- Height: 4490 ft.

Site history
- Materials: Stone

Kothaligad (also called Kotligad/ Kothligad/Peth) is a small fort (3100 ft) situated to the east of Karjat near Karjat-Murbad Road in the Indian state of Maharashtra. It is a famous trek in the Karjat area, because of its small height and easy climbing. It is also known as the Fort of Peth because of its vicinity to Peth village at its base.

== Features ==
There is a small temple and large cave at the base and a chimney like tunnel to the top of the fort. This pinnacle is carved from inside forming a staircase reaching the top. There is a tank of water (rock cut water cistern) at some distance from the cave and another one at the top of the fort. The stone is a single black expanse reaching till the Peth village standing on the fertile soil with abundant natural resources for water and farming.

== History ==
The cave and the temple carvings date back to the 13th century. Not much is known about the history until the 18th century. In 1684 Aurangjeb sent Abdul Kadir and Alai Biradkar to capture this fort. After a small skirmish, the fort was captured by Abdul Kadir. Aurangjeb honoured Abdul Kadir and renamed this fort as Miftah-ul-Fateh (Key to success). Many attempts were made later to win this fort by the Maratha Army, but they were not successful. In 1716, this cave was captured by the British. On 2 November 1817, it was recaptured by the Marathas under the leadership of Bapurao who was general of Bajirao Peshwa. The fort was recaptured by the British on 30 December 1817, by Captain Brooks. The British had the fort till 1862 as an outpost for vigilance on the surrounding valley and the hills all around it.

The locals say that this is not actually a fort but a sort of lighthouse from where the directions were given to know the advancements of the enemy. In fact, it can be called a watch tower to keep a vigil on the Mawal area in the greater province of the Maratha.

== Image gallery ==
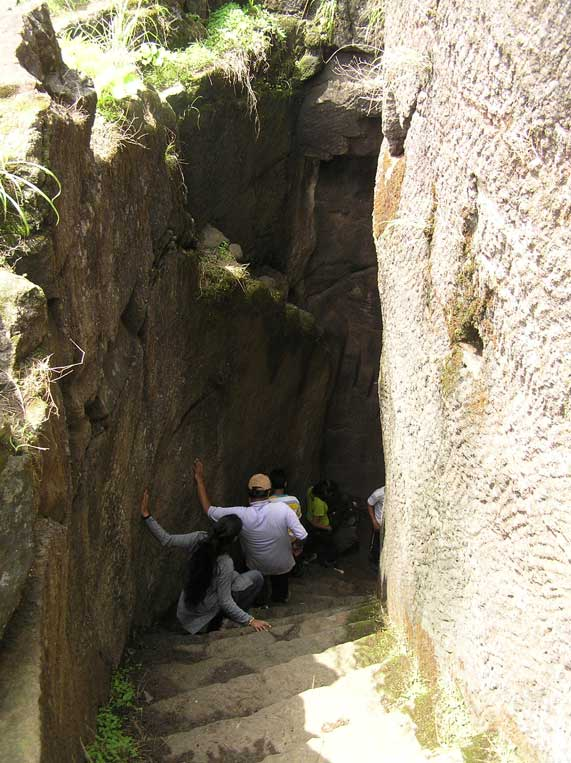
The steep steps of the chimney-like top of the fort are intact and are used by trekkers today.

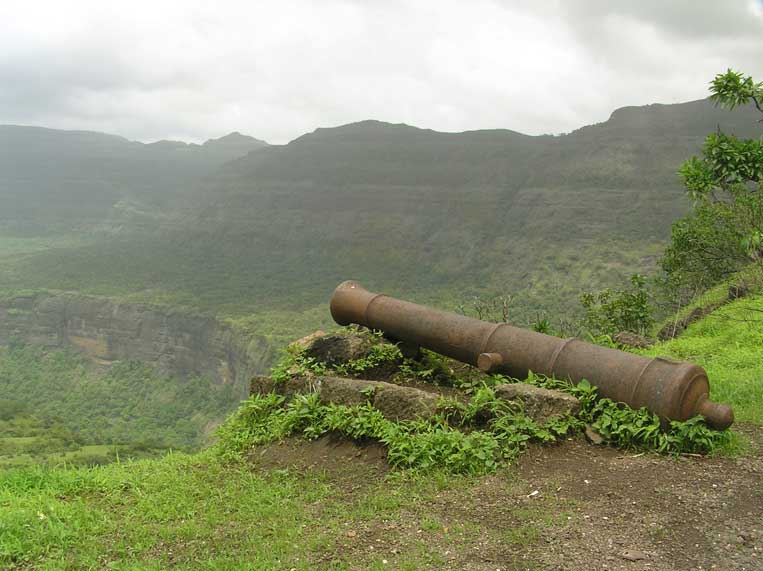
Cannons of Kothaligad fort

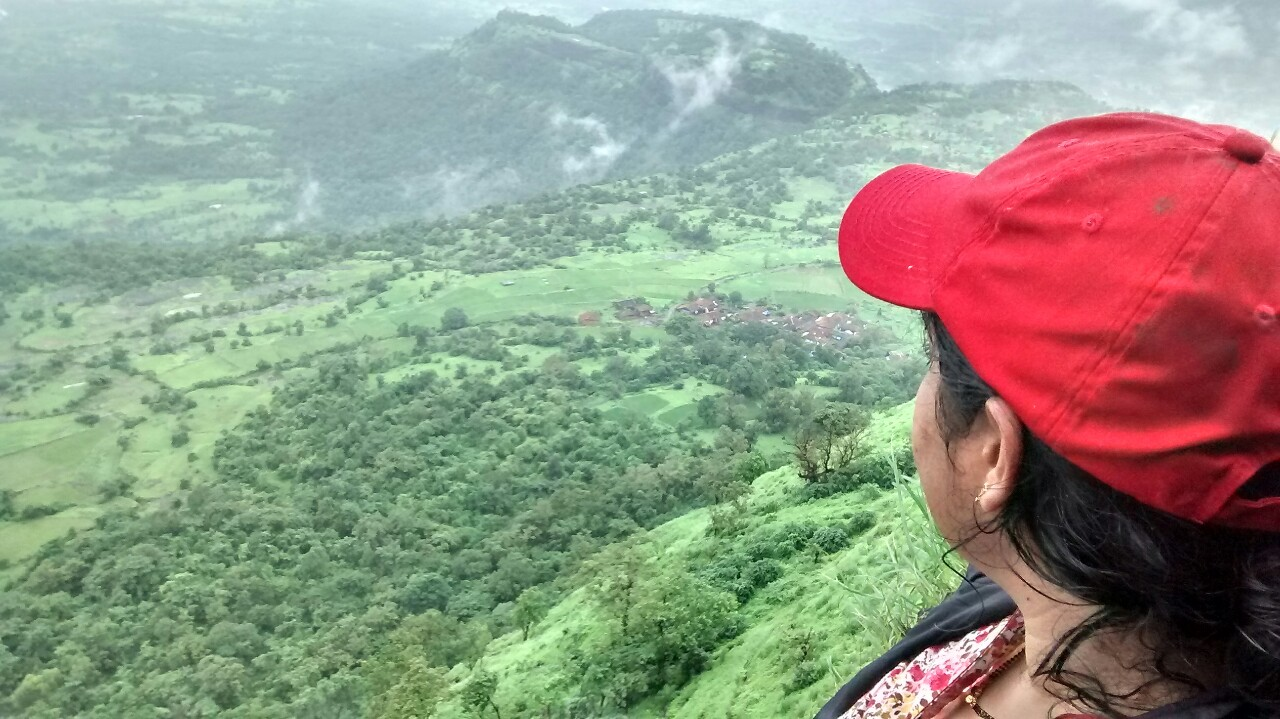
Kothaligad

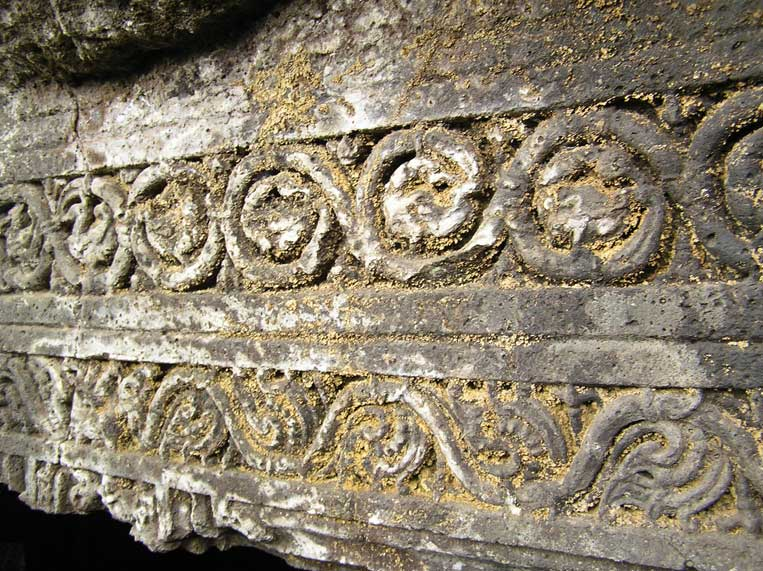
Carvings on the walls of Kothaligad fort

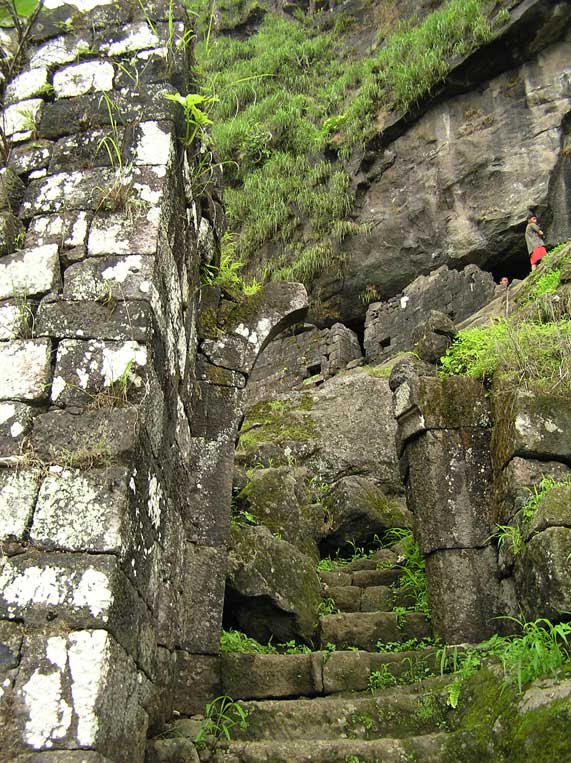
Main entrance, Kothaligad Fort

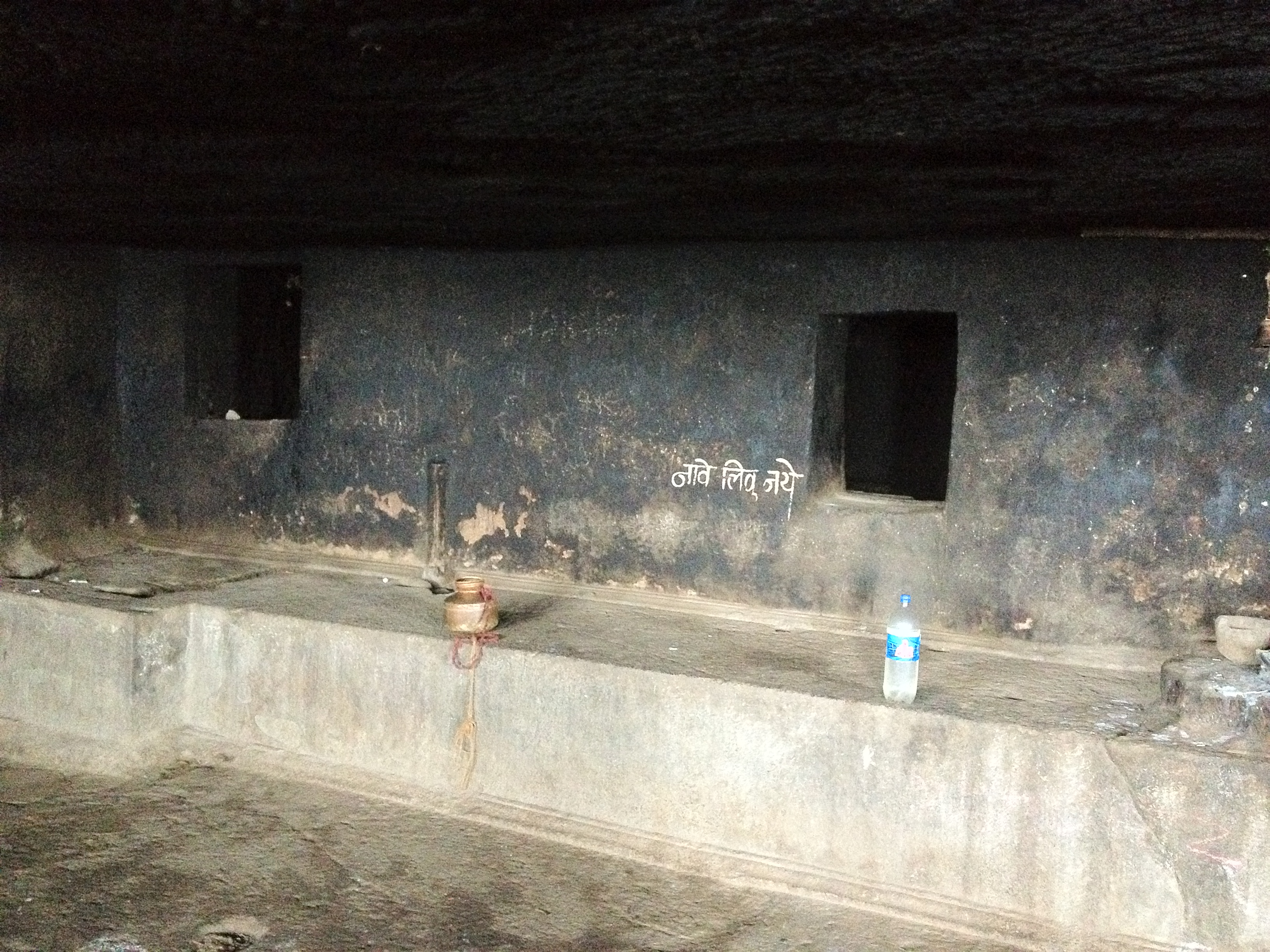
Caves near the Kothaligad Fort

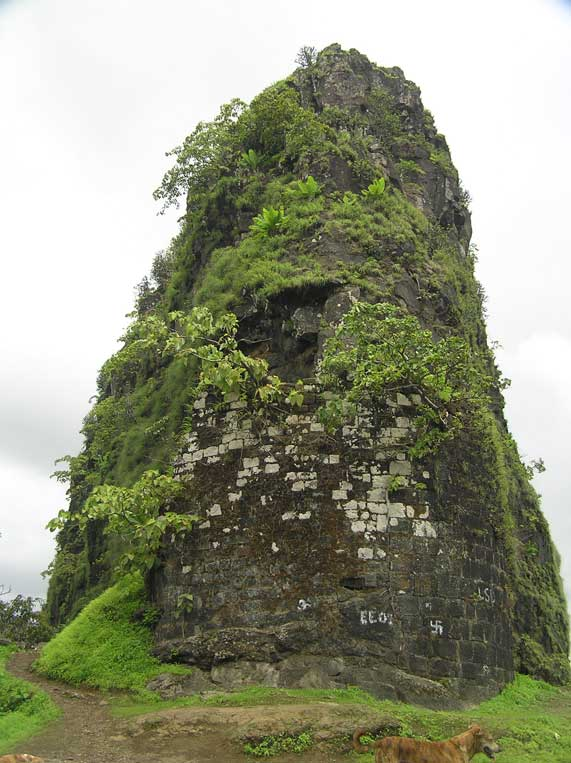
The distinctive chimney-like feature of Kotligad fort

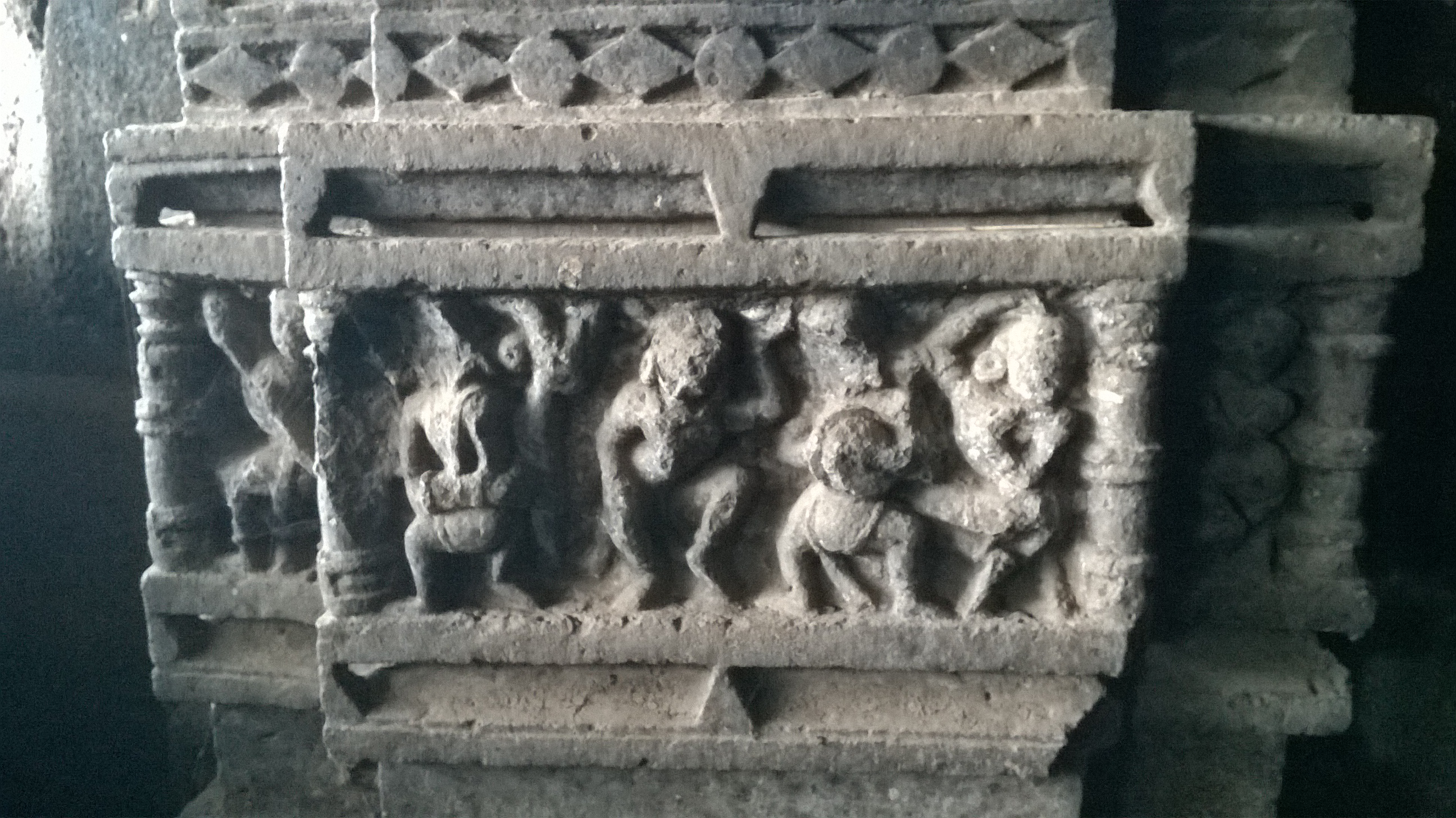
Sculpture on the pillars

== See also ==
- List of forts in Maharashtra
- Marathi People
- List of Maratha dynasties and states
- Maratha War of Independence
- Battles involving the Maratha Empire
- Maratha Army
- Maratha titles
- Military history of India
