= Birbal Negi =

18th-century Kumaoni commander

- Military career
- Allegiance: Kumaon Kingdom; Durrani Empire
- Rank: Commander
- Unit: Kumaoni contingent
- Conflicts: Third Battle of Panipat (1761)

Birbal Negi(puraniya negi) was a Rajput commander in the Kumaon Kingdom. Birbal Negi is traditionally identified as a native of Paithani village, near Dwarahat. His valour in the battle fought against the Rohillas by the Kumaon forces of Badakhera, prior to 3rd battle of Panipat ,is recorded in the historical work kalyanchandrodayam. Birbal Negi also fought in the Third Battle of Panipat in 1761 on the side of Ahmad Shah Durrani against Maratha Empire with his 4000 Kumaoni Rajput men. He is known for his role in battles during that time and is remembered in the history of Kumaon.

== Interference with Kumaoni commanders ==
After the Third Battle of Panipat, the Delhi Emperor wished to meet the brave Kumaoni commanders. However, Rahmat Khan, out of jealousy, blocked the meeting. Instead, he presented gifts to Hari Ram Joshi on behalf of the Emperor and sent him back to Kumaon. Rahmat Khan falsely claimed that the Kumaoni commanders and soldiers had returned to the hills, unable to endure the heat of the plains.
