= Third Battle of Panipat =

1761 battle between the Durrani Empire and Marathas

- Part of the Indian campaign of Ahmad Shah Durrani and the Afghan–Maratha War
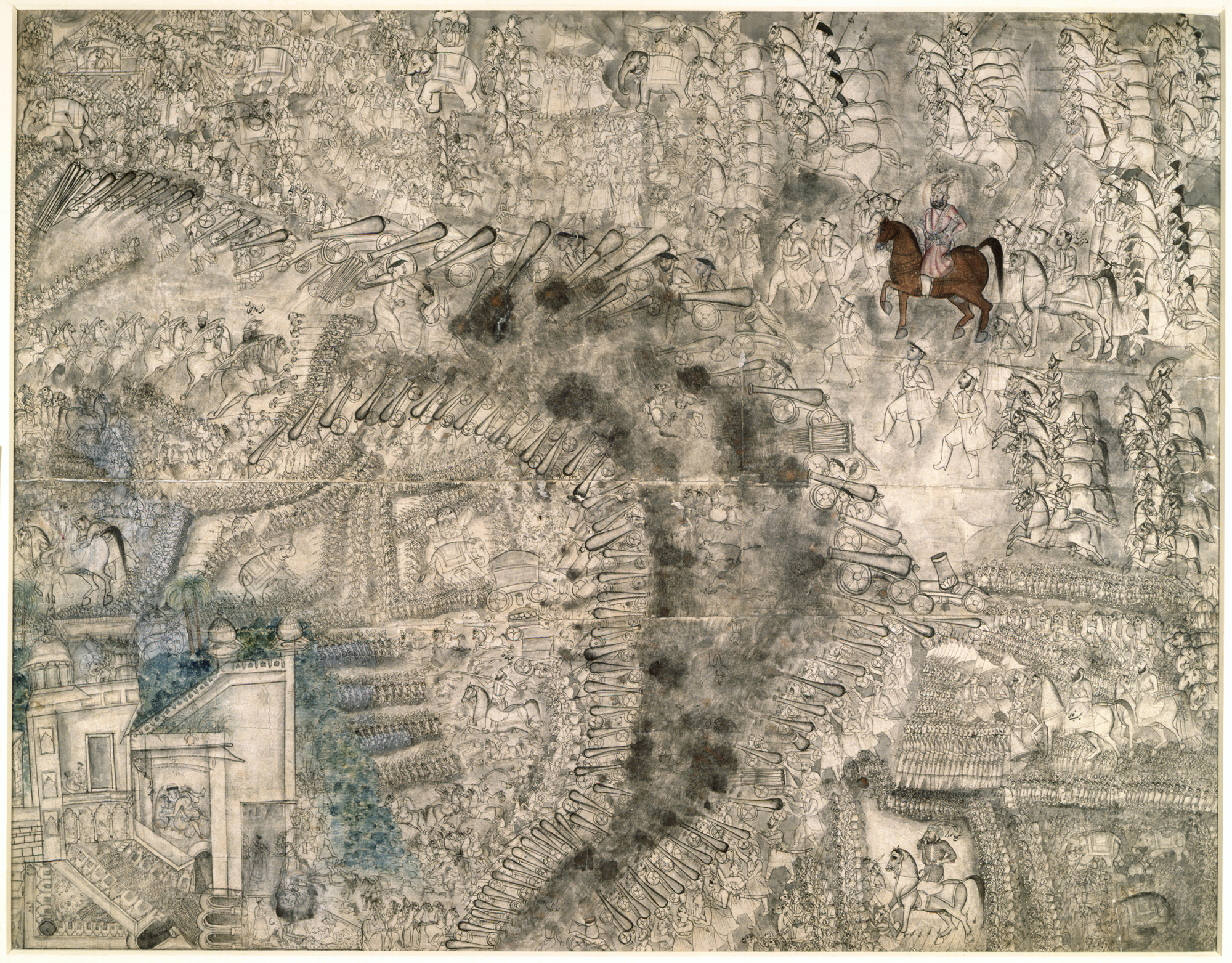
- Faizabad-style painting of the Third Battle of Panipat; the centre of the image is dominated by the twin arcs of the lines of guns firing at each other with smoke and destruction in between c. 1770
Date	14 January 1761
Location	Panipat (present-day Haryana, India) 29.39°N 76.97°E
Result	Durrani victory: Mughal emperor exiled to Awadh

Belligerents
Durrani Empire; Supported by: Rohilla Kingdom of Rohilkhand; Ahmadzai Khanate of Kalat; Nishapuri Kingdom of Awadh; Tanoli State of Amb; Chand Kingdom of Kumaon; Kalhora State of Sindh; Mughal nobles	Maratha Empire; Peshwa; Holkar State of Indore; Scindia State of Gwalior; Gaekwad State of Baroda

Commanders and leaders
Ahmad Shah Durrani (Shah of the Durrani Empire) Afghan officers: Timur Shah Durrani; Jahan Khan; Najabat Khan †; Ali Mohammad Khakwani; Wazir Shah Wali Khan; Atai Khan †; Shah Pasand Khan; Barkhurdar Khan; Abdus Samad Khan †; Wazirullah Khan; Zaman Khan Niazai; Rohilla, Kalat, Awadh, Amb, Kumaon, Sind and Mughal officers: Najib ad-Dawlah; Rahmat Khan Barech; Faizullah Ali Khan; Saadullah Khan; Zabita Khan; Dunde Khan Barech; Nasir Khan Ahmadzai; Mahmud Khan Ahmadzai; Shuja-ud-Daula; Qidwai Ghulam Amir Khan; Suba Khan Tanoli; Haibat Khan Tanoli; Hariram Joshi; Birbal Negi; Harshdev Joshi; Ghulam Shah Kalhoro; Ahmad Khan Bangash; Najaf Khan Bahadur; Mirza Jawan Bakht; Zain Khan Sirhindi; Amir Beg; Murad Khan; Shuja Quli Khan; Banghas Khan	Sadashiv Rao Bhau † (Sarsenapati of the Maratha Empire) Maratha officers: Vishwas Rao Bhat †; Shamsher Bahadur I; Malhar Rao Holkar; Mahadaji Scindia (WIA); Jankoji Rao Scindia (POW); Tukoji Rao Scindia (DOW); Damaji Rao Gaekwad; Ranoji Rao Bhoite (WIA); Ibrahim Khan Gardi (executed); Govind Pant Bundela †; Vitthal Vinchurkar; Antaji Manakeshwar †; Yeshwant Rao Pawar †; Shri. Arvandekar †; Sidhojiraje Gharge-Desai-Deshmukh †; Balwant Rao Mehendele †; Ambaji Ingle

Strength
41,800 Afghan cavalry, of which 28,000 was regular cavalry 32,000 Rohilla infantry 2,000 Zamburak (camel gun)	55,000 Maratha cavalry, of which 11,000 was regular cavalry 9,000 Gardi infantry 200,000 non-combatants (pilgrims and camp-followers)

Casualties and losses
15,000 Rohillas killed and wounded 5,000 Afghans killed and wounded	30,000 killed in battle 10,000 killed while retreating 10,000 missing
- 50,000 Maratha non-combatants executed following the battle 9,000 Marathas in revenge killings following the battle Estimated 22,000 Marathas enslaved

The Third Battle of Panipat (Note: Pashto: د پاني پت درېيمه جگړه Marathi: पानिपतची तिसरी लढाई Persian: سومین نبرد پانی پت Sanskrit: पाणिपेतस्य तृतीयं युद्धम्) took place on 14 January 1761 between the Maratha Empire and the invading army of the Durrani Empire. The battle took place in and around the city of Panipat, approximately 97 kilometres (60 mi) north of Delhi. The Afghans were supported by three key allies in India: Najib-ud-Daula who persuaded the support of the Rohilla chiefs, elements of the declining Mughal Empire, and most prized the Oudh State under Shuja-ud-Daula. The Maratha army was led by Sadashivrao Bhau, who was third-highest authority of the Maratha Confederacy after the Chhatrapati and the Peshwa. The bulk of the Maratha army was stationed in the Deccan Plateau with the Peshwa.

Militarily, the battle pitted the artillery, musketry, and cavalry of the Marathas against the heavy cavalry, musketry (jezail) and mounted artillery (zamburak) of the Afghans and the Rohillas led by Ahmad Shah Durrani and Najib ud-Daula. The battle is considered to have been the largest and one of the most eventful fought in the 18th century, and it had perhaps the largest number of fatalities in a single day reported in a classic formation battle between two armies.

The battle lasted for several days and involved over 125,000 troops; protracted skirmishes occurred, with losses and gains on both sides. The Afghan army ultimately emerged victorious from the battle after successfully destroying several Maratha flanks. The extent of the losses on both sides is heavily disputed by historians, but it is believed that between 60,000 and 70,000 troops were killed in the fighting, while the numbers of injured and prisoners taken vary considerably. According to the single-best eyewitness chronicle—the bakhar by Shuja-ud-Daula's Diwan Kashi Raja—about 40,000 Maratha prisoners were collectively massacred on the day after the battle. British historian Grant Duff includes an interview of a survivor of these massacres in his History of the Marathas and generally corroborates this number. Shejwalkar, whose monograph Panipat 1761 is often regarded as the single-best secondary source on the battle, says that "not less than 100,000 Marathas (soldiers and non-combatants) perished during and after the battle".

== Background ==
In 1757, Ahmad Shah Durrani appointed his son, Timur Shah, as the governor of Punjab. Since Timur Shah was a minor, the Durrani commander-in-chief, Jahan Khan, assumed control of the administration. Jahan Khan's rule was harsh—he forced Adina Beg Khan, the governor of Jalandhar Doab, to retreat to the hills and persecuted Sodhi Wadbhag Singh of Kartarpur. Determined to retaliate, Adina Beg Khan allied with Jassa Singh Ahluwalia by paying a large tribute and permitting the Sikhs to plunder the Jalandhar Doab and defeated the Afghans at Battle of Mahilpur (1757). By March 1758, Adina Beg Khan became uneasy with the growing influence of the Sikhs. He sought help from the Marathas, who had gained control of Delhi after defeating the Mughals in the Battle of Delhi (1757). Adina Beg offered the Marathas a large daily payment to assist him in capturing Lahore. Additionally, he persuaded the Sikhs to join forces with the Marathas against the Afghans. Adina Beg also gained the support of Raghunathrao and together they drove the Afghans out of Lahore. The Maratha and Sikh forces then pursued the retreating Afghans on horseback, eventually capturing Attock. The Punjab now came under Maratha rule, with Adina appointed subahdar of the Punjab in 1758 in return for a yearly tribute of seventy five lakh of rupees. Raghunathrao and Malhar Rao Holkar, the two commanders-in-chief of the Maratha forces, remained in Lahore for three months after which they retired to the Deccan leaving Adina in sole control.

This brought the Marathas into direct confrontation with the Durrani Empire of Ahmad Shāh Abdali. In 1759, he raised an army the core of which was from the Qizilbash, and recruited other troops such as the Pashtun tribes, Kurds, and Uzbeks. and made several gains against the smaller Maratha garrisons in Punjab. He then joined his Indian allies—the Rohillas of the Gangetic Doab, the Muslims of Northern India, and Shuja-ud-Daula—forming a broad coalition against the Marathas.

To counter this, Raghunathrao was supposed to go north to handle the situation. Raghunathrao asked for large number of soldiers, which was denied by Sadashivrao Bhau, his cousin and Diwan of Peshwa. Therefore, he declined to go. Sadashivrao Bhau was instead made commander in chief of the Maratha Army, under whom the Battle of Panipat was fought.

The Marathas, under the command of Sadashivrao Bhau, responded by gathering an army of between 45,000 and 60,000, which was accompanied by roughly 200,000 non-combatants, a number of whom were pilgrims desirous of making pilgrimages to Hindu holy sites in northern India. The Marathas started their northward journey from Patdur on 14 March 1760. Both sides tried to get the Nawab of Awadh, Shuja-ud-Daulah, into their camp. By late July Shuja-ud-Daulah made the decision to join the Afghan-Rohilla coalition, preferring to join what was perceived as the "army of Islam".

=== Rise of the Marathas ===
Grant Duff, describing the Maratha army:

The lofty and spacious tents, lined with silks and broadcloths, were surmounted by large gilded ornaments, conspicuous at a distance... Vast numbers of elephants, flags of all descriptions, the finest horses, magnificently caparisoned ... seemed to be collected from every quarter ... it was an imitation of the more becoming and tasteful array of the Mughuls in the zenith of their glory.

The Marathas had gained control of a considerable part of India in the intervening period (1712–1757). In 1758 they nominally occupied Delhi, captured Lahore and drove out Timur Shah Durrani, the son and viceroy of the Afghan ruler, Ahmad Shah Abdali. This was the high-water mark of Maratha expansion, where the boundaries of their empire extended north of the Sindhu river all the way down south to northern Kerala. This territory was ruled through the Peshwa, who talked of placing his son Vishwasrao on the Mughal throne. However, Delhi still remained under the control of Mughals, key Muslim intellectuals including Shah Waliullah and other Muslim clergies in India were frightened at these developments. In desperation they appealed to Ahmad Shah Abdali, the ruler of Afghanistan, to halt the threat. The Marathas attempted to turn over the support of the Gujarati Muslim Babis, the Indian Rohillas, Nizam brothers of the Deccan, and Shuja-ud-Dawlah.

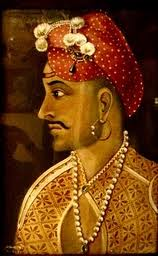
Sadashivrao Bhau

== Prelude ==
Ahmad Shah Durrani (Ahmad Shah Abdali), angered by the news from his son and his allies, was unwilling to allow the Marathas' spread go unchecked. By the end of 1759 Abdali with his Qizilbash and the Afghan tribes, had reached Lahore as well as Delhi and defeated the smaller enemy garrisons, and was joined by the Muslims of Northern India, the Rohillas, and Shuja-ud-Daula. Ahmed Shah, at this point, withdrew his army to Anupshahr, on the frontier of the Rohilla country, where he successfully convinced the Nawab of Oudh Shuja-ud-Daula to join his alliance against the Marathas. The Marathas had earlier helped Safdarjung (father of Shuja) in defeating Rohillas in Farrukhabad. Several high ranking nobles of the Mughal Empire were able to persuade Maharaja Deep Chand of the Kingdom of Kumaon, an old Himalayan ally of the Mughal Empire, to support the Afghan side in the battle.

The Marathas under Sadashivrao Bhau responded to the news of the Afghans' return to North India by raising an army, and they marched North. Bhau's force was bolstered by some Maratha forces under Holkar, Scindia, Gaikwad and Govind Pant Bundele. Suraj Mal (the Jat ruler of Bharatpur) also had joined Bhausaheb initially. This combined army captured the Mughal capital, Delhi, from an Afghan garrison in December 1759. Delhi had been reduced to ashes many times due to previous invasions, and in addition there being acute shortage of supplies in the Maratha camp. Bhau ordered the sacking of the already depopulated city. He is said to have planned to place his nephew and the Peshwa's son, Vishwasrao, on the Delhi throne. The Jats withdrew their support from the Marathas. Their withdrawal from the ensuing battle was to play a crucial role in its result. The first blood was drawn when the leader of the Rohillas, an Indian Muslim named Qutb Khan, attacked a small Maratha army led by Dattaji Shinde at Burari Ghat. Dattaji camped at the Buradi Fort, south of Panipat, deciding to only engage with Abdali with the aid of Malharao Holkar. He was beheaded and killed in an attack by Qutb Khan.

=== Suraj Mal's advice to Sadashiv Rao Bhau ===
Before Battle of Panipat a war council was formed by Maratha commander-in-chief Sadashiv Rao Bhau in which Raja Suraj Mal was invited to give advice for war strategy against Abdali.

Jat chief Raja Surajmal provided following advice :

- Women, children, old people, families of soldier and non combatants should either be left on the other side of Chambal in Maratha's stronghold of Jhansi and Gwalior or in protection of Suraj Mal’s one of 4 forts in Jat strongholds.
- Large baggage and heavy artillery should not be taken as they will slow down Maratha movement in the battlefield against Durrani’s forces.
- If Marathas find themselves on losing ground then a quick moving force will be able to move backwards in friendly country easily and Abdali will not be keen on crossing Chambal.
- Road for supply lines should be kept open so that Maratha army will not face problems in getting supplies during war
- One division of the Maratha army should be sent to Lahore and other to the east to destroy the supply lines so that Abdali will not be able to secure supplies from his allies for his army.
- A light cavalry guerrilla warfare will be suggested instead of conventional face-to-face warfare as Durrani will not be able to sustain a long warfare and when Monsoon will come both sides will find forces moving much slower, Durrani will be in much more disadvantage without supplies compared to Marathas and this will force Abdali to move back to his country.

Many of the Maratha generals found it good strategy as they themselves prefer guerrilla warfare but Sadashiv Rao Bhau found it dishonourable for a king and took this as result of Maratha general's old age and Suraj Mal's foolishness.

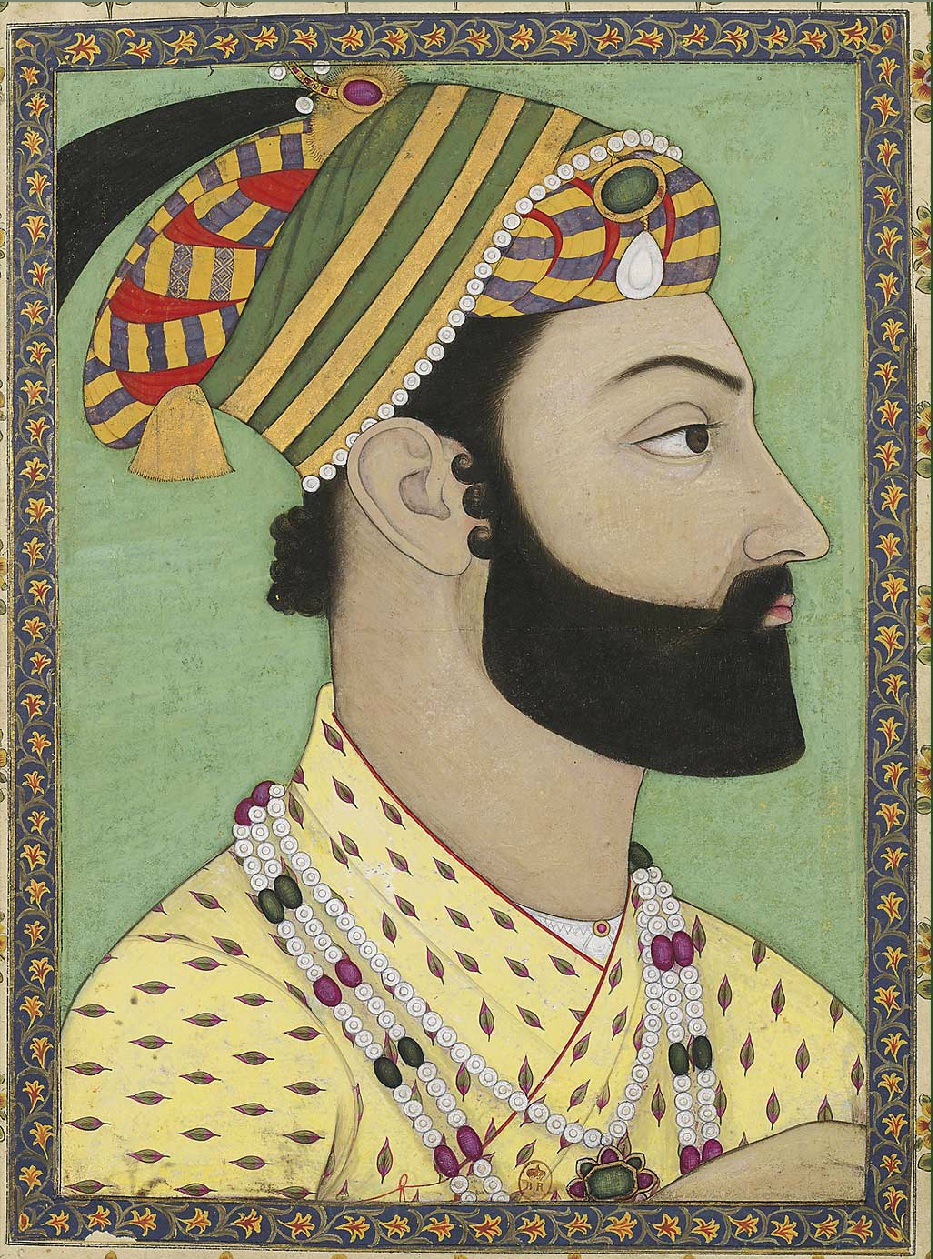
Portrait of Ahmad Shah Durrani

== Skirmishes before the battle ==
=== Afghan defeat at Kunjpura ===
With both sides poised for battle, manoeuvring followed, with skirmishes between the two armies fought around Karnal and Kunjpura. Abdus Samad Khan, the faujdar of Sirhind, had come to Kunjpura, on the banks of the Yamuna river 60 miles to the north of Delhi with a force of more than ten thousand and supplies for the Afghan force. Kunjpura was stormed by the Marathas who was running short of supplies. Aided by the musketeers under Ibrahim Gardi, the Marathas achieved a rather easy victory at Kunjpura against an army of around 15,000 Afghans posted there. Some of Abdali's best generals like Najabat Khan were killed. Abdus Samad Khan, the faujdar of Sirhind, was also killed during the battle. Mian Qutb Shah, who was responsible for beheading Dattaji Shinde at the Battle of Barari Ghat was executed by the Marathas after their capture of Kunjpura. Ahmad Shah was encamped on the left bank of the Yamuna River, which was swollen by rains, and was powerless to aid the garrison. The whole Afghan garrison was killed or enslaved. The massacre of the Kunjpura garrison, within sight of the Durrani camp, exasperated Abdali to such an extent that he ordered crossing of the river at all costs.

=== Afghans cross Yamuna and the Battles of Samalkha and Meerut ===
Ahmed Shah and his allies on 17 October 1760, broke up from Shahdara, marching south. Taking a calculated risk, Abdali plunged into the river, followed by his bodyguards and troops. Between 23 and 25 October they were able to cross at Baghpat(a small town about 24 miles up the river), unopposed by the Marathas who were still preoccupied with the sacking of Kunjpura and visit to nearby Kurukshetra; an important Hindu pilgrimage destination.

After the Marathas failed to prevent Abdali's forces from crossing the Yamuna River, they set up defensive works in the ground near Panipat, thereby blocking his access back to Afghanistan, just as Abdali's forces blocked theirs to the south. However, on the afternoon of 26 October, Ahmad Shah's advance guard reached Samalkha, about halfway between Sonepat and Panipat, where they encountered the vanguard of the Marathas. A fierce skirmish ensued, in which the Afghans lost 1,000 men but drove the Marathas back to their main body, which kept retreating slowly for several days. This led to the partial encirclement of the Maratha army. In skirmishes that followed, Govind Pant Bundele, with 10,000 light cavalry who weren't formally trained soldiers, was on a foraging mission with about 500 men. They were surprised by an Afghan force near Meerut, and in the ensuing fight, Bundele was killed. This was followed by the loss of a contingent of 2,000 Maratha soldiers who had left Delhi to deliver money and rations to Panipat. This completed the encirclement, as Ahmad Shah had cut off the Maratha army's supply lines.

With supplies and stores dwindling, tensions started rising in the Maratha camp. Initially the Marathas had moved in almost 150 pieces of modern long-range, French-made artillery. With a range of over a kilometre, these guns were some of the best of the time. The Marathas' plan was to lure the Afghan army to confront them while they had close artillery support.

=== Preliminary moves ===
During the next two months of the siege, constant skirmishes and duels took place between units from the two sides. In one of these Najib lost 3,000 of his Rohillas and was nearly killed himself. Facing a potential stalemate, Abdali decided to seek terms, which Bhau was willing to consider. However, Najib Khan delayed any chance of an agreement with an appeal on religious grounds and sowed doubt about whether the Marathas would honour any agreement.

After the Marathas moved from Kunjpura to Panipat, Diler Khan Marwat, with his father Alam Khan Marwat and a force of 2500 Pashtuns, attacked and took control of Kunjpura, where there was a Maratha garrison of 700–800 soldiers. At that time Atai Khan Baluch, son of the Shah Wali Khan, the Wazir of Abdali, came from Afghanistan with 10,000 cavalry and cut off the supplies to the Marathas. The Marathas at Panipat were surrounded by Abdali in the south, Pashtun tribes (Yousufzai, Afridi, Khattak) in the east, Shuja, Atai Khan and others in the north and other Pashtun tribes (Gandapur, Marwat, Durranis and Kakars) in the west. Unable to continue without supplies or wait for reinforcements from Pune any longer, Bhau decided to break the siege. His plan was to pulverize the enemy formations with cannon fire and not to employ his cavalry until the Afghans were thoroughly softened up. With the Afghans broken, he would move camp in a defensive formation towards Delhi, where they were assured supplies.

=== Formations ===
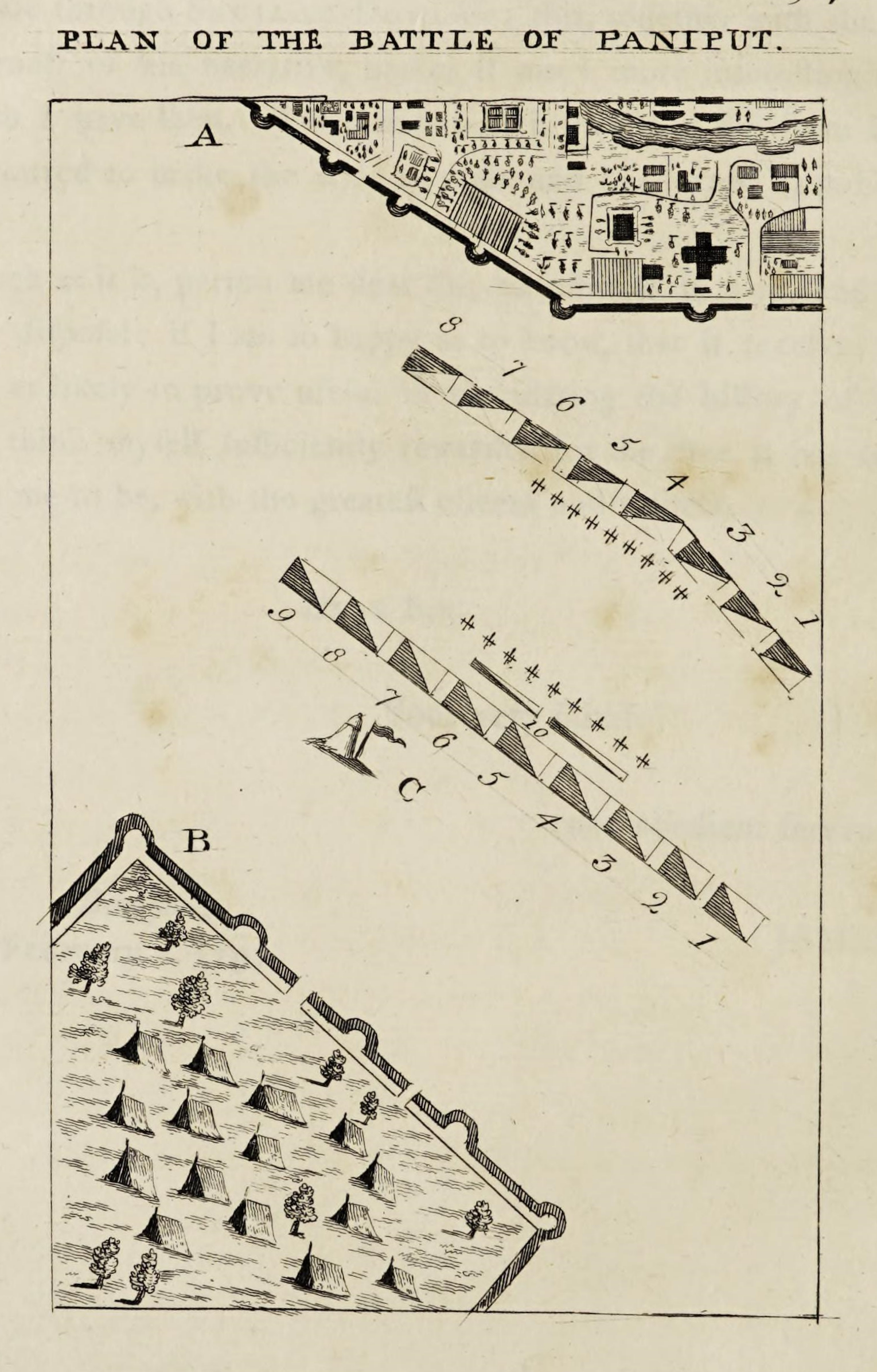
Plan of the Third Battle of Panipat based on Kashi raja (Casi Raja) Pandit's account

With the Maratha chiefs pressurizing Sadashivrao Bhau, to go to battle rather than perish by starvation, on 13 January, the Marathas left their camp before dawn and marched south towards the Afghan camp in a desperate attempt to break the siege. The two armies came face-to-face around 8:00 a.m.

The Maratha lines began a little to the north of Kala Amb. They had thus blocked the northward path of Abdali's troops and at the same time were blocked from heading south—in the direction of Delhi, where they could get badly needed supplies—by those same troops. Bhau, with the Peshwa's son and the royal guard (Huzurat), was in the centre. The left wing consisted of the Gardis under Ibrahim Khan. Holkar and Sindhia were on the extreme right.

The Maratha line was formed up some 12 km across, with the artillery in front, protected by infantry, pikemen, musketeers and bowmen. The cavalry was instructed to wait behind the artillery and bayonet-wielding musketeers, ready to be thrown in when control of the battlefield had been fully established. Behind this line was another ring of 30,000 young Maratha soldiers who were not battle-tested, and then the civilians. Many were ordinary men, women and children on their pilgrimage to Hindu holy places and shrines. Behind the civilians was yet another protective infantry line, of young, inexperienced soldiers.

On the other side the Afghans formed a somewhat similar line, a few metres to the south of today's Sanauli Road. Their left was being formed by Najib and their right by two brigades of troops. Their left centre was led by two Viziers, Shuja-ud-daulah with 3,000 soldiers and 50–60 cannons and Ahmad Shah's Vizier Shah Wali with a choice body of 19,000 mailed Afghan horsemen. The right centre consisted of 15,000 Rohillas under Hafiz Rahmat and other chiefs of the Rohilla Pathans. Pasand Khan covered the left wing with 5,000 cavalry, Barkurdar Khan and Amir Beg covered the right with 3,000 Rohilla cavalry. Long-range musketeers were also present during the battle. In this order the army of Ahmed Shah moved forward, leaving him at his preferred post in the centre, which was now in the rear of the line, from where he could watch and direct the battle.

== Battle ==
=== Early phases ===
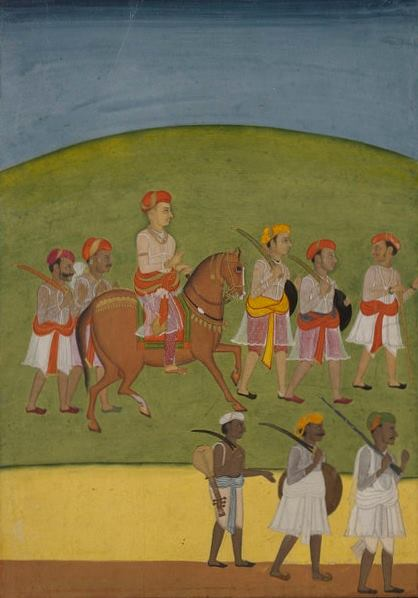
Balaji Rao's troops under the command of his cousin Sadashivrao Bhau fighting at Panipat

Before dawn on 14 January 1761, the Maratha troops broke their fast with sugared water in the camp and prepared for combat. They emerged from the trenches, pushing the artillery into position on their prearranged lines, some 2 km from the Afghans. Seeing that the battle was on, Ahmad Shah positioned his 60 smooth-bore cannon and opened fire.

The initial attack was led by the Maratha left flank under Ibrahim Khan, who advanced his infantry in formation against the Rohillas and Shah Pasand Khan. The first salvos from the Maratha artillery went over the Afghans' heads and did very little damage. Nevertheless, the first Afghan attack by Najib Khan's Rohillas was broken by Maratha bowmen and pikemen, along with a unit of the famed Gardi musketeers stationed close to the artillery positions. The second and subsequent salvos were fired at point-blank range into the Afghan ranks. The resulting carnage sent the Rohillas reeling back to their lines, leaving the battlefield in the hands of Ibrahim for the next three hours, during which the 8,000 Gardi musketeers killed about 12,000 Rohillas.

In the second phase, Bhau himself led the charge against the left-of-center Afghan forces, under the Afghan Vizier Shah Wali Khan. The sheer force of the attack nearly broke the Afghan lines, and the Afghan soldiers started to desert their positions in the confusion. Desperately trying to rally his forces, Shah Wali appealed to Shuja ud Daulah for assistance. However, the Nawab did not break from his position, effectively splitting the Afghan force's center. Despite Bhau's success and the ferocity of the charge, the attack did not attain complete success as many of the half-starved Maratha mounts were exhausted. Also, there were no heavy armoured cavalry units for the Marathas to maintain these openings. In order to turn about the deserting Afghan troopers, Abdali deployed his Nascibchi musketeers to gun down the deserters who finally stopped and returned to the field.

=== Final phase ===
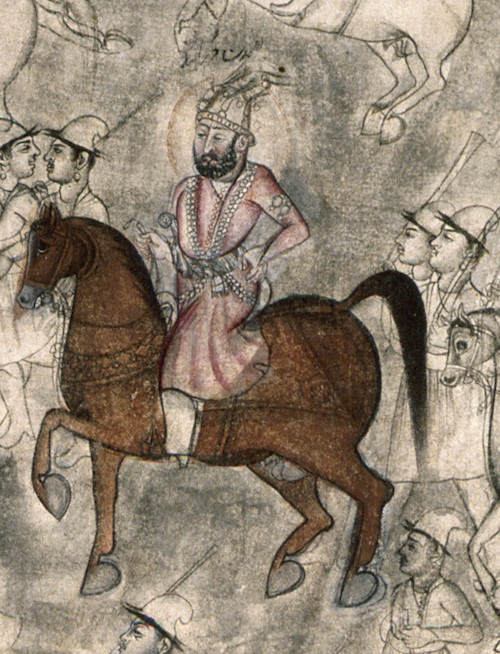
Ahmad Shah Durrani in battle

The Marathas, under Scindia, attacked Najib. Najib successfully fought a defensive action, however, keeping Scindia's forces at bay. By noon it looked as though Bhau would clinch victory for the Marathas once again. The Afghan left flank still held its own, but the centre was cut in two and the right was almost destroyed. Ahmad Shah had watched the fortunes of the battle from his tent, guarded by the still unbroken forces on his left. He sent his bodyguards to call up his 15,000 reserve troops from his camp and arranged them as a column in front of his cavalry of musketeers (Qizilbash) and 2,000 swivel-mounted shutarnaals or Ushtranaal—cannons—on the backs of camels.

The shutarnaals, because of their positioning on camels, could fire an extensive salvo over the heads of their own infantry, at the Maratha cavalry. The Maratha cavalry was unable to withstand the muskets and camel-mounted swivel cannons of the Afghans. They could be fired without the rider having to dismount and were especially effective against fast-moving cavalry. Abdali therefore, sent 500 of his own bodyguards with orders to raise all able-bodied men out of camp and send them to the front. He sent 1,500 more to punish the front-line troops who attempted to flee the battle and kill without mercy any soldier who would not return to the fight. These extra troops, along with 4,000 of his reserve troops, went to support the broken ranks of the Rohillas on the right. The remainder of the reserve, 10,000 strong, were sent to the aid of Shah Wali, still labouring unequally against the Bhau in the centre of the field. These mailed warriors were to charge with the Vizier in close order and at full gallop. Whenever they charged the enemy in front, the chief of the staff and Najib were directed to fall upon either flank.

With their own men in the firing line, the Maratha artillery could not respond to the shathurnals and the cavalry charge. Some 7,000 Maratha cavalry and infantry were killed before the hand-to-hand fighting began at around 14:00 hrs. By 16:00 hrs, the tired Maratha infantry began to succumb to the onslaught of attacks from fresh Afghan reserves, protected by armoured leather jackets.

=== Outflanked ===
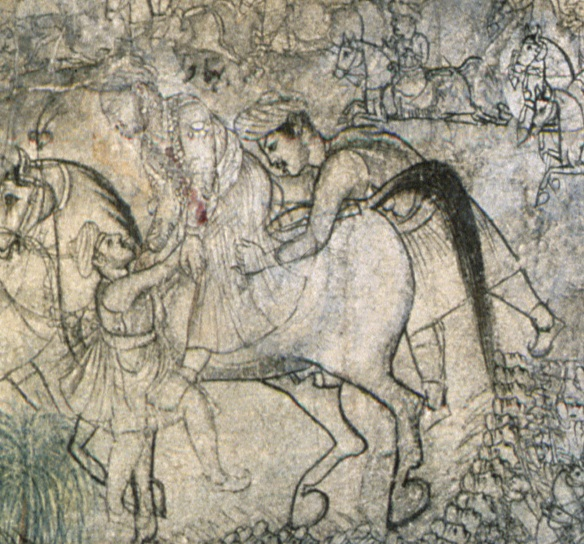
Sadashivrao Bhau wounded in battle

Sadashiv Rao Bhau who had not kept any reserves, seeing his forward lines dwindling, civilians behind and upon seeing Vishwasrao disappear in the midst of the fighting, felt he had no choice but to come down from his elephant and lead the battle.

Taking advantage of this, the Afghan soldiers who had been captured by the Marathas earlier during the Siege of Kunjpura revolted. The prisoners unwrapped their green belts and wore them as turbans to impersonate the troops of the Durrani Empire and began attacking from within. This brought confusion and great consternation to the Maratha soldiers, who thought that the enemy had attacked from the rear. Some Maratha troops in the vanguard, seeing that their general had disappeared from his elephant and the chaos ensuing in the rear, panicked and scattered in disarray towards the rear.

Abdali had given a part of his army the task of surrounding and killing the Gardis, who were at the leftmost part of the Maratha army. Bhausaheb had ordered Vitthal Vinchurkar (with 1500 cavalry) and Damaji Gaikwad (with 2500 cavalry) to protect the Gardis. However, after seeing the Gardis having no clearing for directing their cannon fire at the enemy troops, they lost their patience and decided to fight the Rohillas themselves. Thus, they broke their position and went all out on the Rohillas. The Rohilla riflemen started accurately firing at the Maratha cavalry, which was equipped only with swords. This gave the Rohillas the opportunity to encircle the Gardis and outflank the Maratha centre while Shah Wali pressed on attacking the front. Thus the Gardis were left defenceless and started falling one by one.

Vishwasrao had already been killed by a shot to the head. Bhau and the Huzurati royal forces fought till the end, the Maratha leader having three horses shot out from under him. At this stage, the Holkar and Scindia contingents, realizing the battle was lost, merged their forces with one contingent breaking from the Maratha right flank and escaped from the opening in the Durrani lines southwards as Jankoji Rao Scindia lead the other contingent to reinforce the thinning lines of Marathas. The Maratha front lines remained largely intact, with some of their artillery units fighting until sunset. Choosing not to launch a night attack, many Maratha troops escaped that night. Bhau's wife Parvatibai, who was assisting in the administration of the Maratha camp, escaped to Pune with her bodyguard, Janu Bhintada along with Nana Fadnavis under the protection of Malhar Rao Holkar's contingent. Some 15,000 soldiers managed to reach Gwalior.

== Reasons for the outcome ==
Durrani had both numeric as well as qualitative superiority over the Marathas. The combined Afghan army was much larger than that of the Marathas. Though the Maratha infantry was organized along European lines and their army had some of the best French-made guns of the time, their artillery was static and lacked mobility against the fast-moving Afghan forces. The Afghan heavy mounted artillery of proved much better in the battlefield than the Maratha light artillery. None of the other Hindu kings joined forces to fight Abdali. Allies of Abdali, namely, Najib, Shuja, and the Rohillas knew North India very well. He was also diplomatic, striking agreements with Hindu leaders, especially the Jats and Rajputs, and former rivals like the Nawab of Awadh, appealing to him in the name of religion.

Moreover, the senior Maratha chiefs constantly bickered with one another. Each had ambitions of carving out an independent state and had no interest in fighting against a common enemy. Some of them did not want a pitched battle, and wanted to fight using guerrilla tactics instead of charging the enemy head-on. The Marathas were fighting alone at a place which was almost 1,000 km away from their capital Pune.

Raghunathrao was supposed to go north to reinforce the army. Raghunathrao asked for large amounts of money and troops, which was denied by Sadashivrao Bhau, his cousin and Diwan of Peshwa, so he declined to go. Sadashivrao Bhau was there upon made commander in chief of the Maratha Army, under whom the Battle of Panipat was fought. Some historians have opined, that the Peshwa's decision to appoint Sadashivrao Bhau as the Supreme Commander instead of Holkar or Raghunathrao proved to be an unfortunate one, as Sadashivrao was totally ignorant of the political and military situation in North India.

If Holkar had remained in the battlefield, the Maratha defeat would have been delayed but not averted. Ahmad Shah's superiority in pitched battle could've been averted by guerrilla warfare, as advised by Holkar and Suraj Mal. However it is described as impossible to implement due to the camp followers of Bhau's army, and the general quality of his men. It is also believed that the Afghans would not be susceptible to such tactics, due to the Afghan horses being able to outmaneuver the Marathas in battle. Abdali was in no position to maintain his field army in India indefinitely due to external threats.

== Massacres after the battle ==
After the defeat the Marathas fled in all directions, and the Afghans, Mughals, Rohillas and Awadh troops fell upon them and were busy in plundering and slaying soldiers and civilians. Afghan officers who had lost their kin in battle were permitted to carry out massacres of Marathas the next day also, in Panipat and the surrounding area. They arranged victory mounds of severed heads outside their camps. According to the single best eyewitness chronicle – the bakhar by Shuja-ud-Daula's Diwan Casi Raja(Kashi Raja) – about 40,000 Maratha prisoners were slaughtered in cold blood the day after the battle. According to Hamilton, a reporter of the Bombay Gazette, about half a million Marathi people were present there in Panipat town and he gives a figure of 40,000 prisoners as executed by Afghans. Qutb Shah's son slaughtered 4,000 fugitives near Sonepat and Abdus Samad Khan's son killed 5,000 near Bahadurgad, to avenge their fathers deaths. Some 22,000 women and children were driven off as slaves.

All of the prisoners were transported on bullock carts, camels and elephants in bamboo cages. 2000 of whom were saved by Sikhs led by Jassa Singh Ahluwalia. Thereafter, he was known as Bandi chhor, or the Liberator of captives.

Siyar-ut-Mutakhirin says:

The unhappy prisoners were paraded in long lines, given a little parched grain and a drink of water, and beheaded... and the women and children who survived were driven off as slaves – twenty-two thousand, many of them of the highest rank in the land.

== Aftermath ==
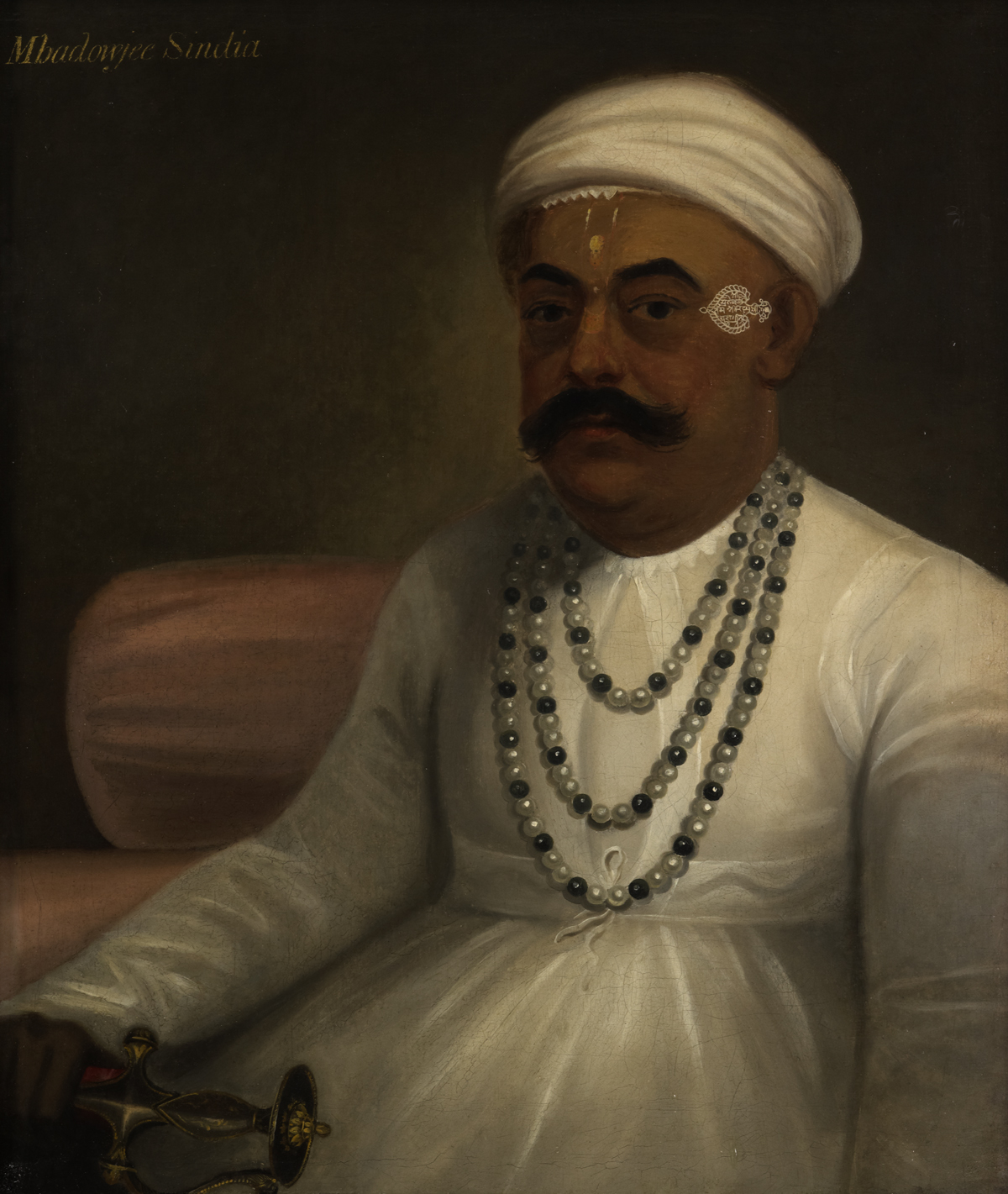
Mahadaji Shinde restored Maratha domination over northern India, within a decade after the war.

The bodies of Vishwasrao and Bhau were recovered by the Marathas and were cremated according to their custom. Bhau's wife Parvatibai was saved by Holkar, per the directions of Bhau, and eventually returned to Pune.

Peshwa Balaji Baji Rao, uninformed about the state of his army, was crossing the Narmada with a relief force and supplies when he heard of the defeat. He returned to Pune and never recovered from the shock of the debacle at Panipat. According to Kashi Raja Pundit, "It was Balaji Bajirao's love of pleasure which was responsible for Panipat. He delayed at Paithan celebrating his second marriage until December 27, when it was too late."

Jankoji Scindia was taken prisoner and executed at the instigation of Najib. Ibrahim Khan Gardi was tortured and executed by enraged Afghan soldiers. The Marathas never fully recovered from the loss at Panipat, but they remained the largest empire in the Indian subcontinent and managed to retake Delhi ten years later. However, their claim over all of India ended with the three Anglo-Maratha Wars, in the early 19th century.

These circumstances made Abdali leave India at the earliest. Before departing, he ordered the Indian chiefs, through a Royal Firman (order) (including Clive of India), to recognize Shah Alam II as Emperor.

Map of India in 1765

Ahmad Shah also appointed Najib-ud-Daula as ostensible regent to the Mughal Emperor. In addition, Najib and Munir-ud-daulah agreed to pay to Abdali, on behalf of the Mughal emperor, an annual tribute of four million rupees, which was never actually paid. In March 1761, Ahmad Shah left for Afghanistan. As he travelled through Punjab, his forces were often troubled by the Sikhs. After crossing the Sutlej River, the Sikhs attacked some of the soldiers who were lagging behind. Ahmad Shah did not react immediately because his army was weighed down by the loot. To protect his camp, he built small fortifications around it every night and continued his journey toward the Attock River, with the Sikhs following him. The Durrani victory at Panipat put an end to the Maratha plans of taking control of Punjab. This left the Durranis and the Sikhs as the two main powers fighting for control over the region. Ahmad Shah then focused on confronting the Sikhs.

The Jats under Suraj Mal benefited significantly from not participating in the Battle of Panipat. They provided considerable assistance to the Maratha soldiers and civilians who escaped the fighting.

Shah Shuja's forces (including Persian advisers) played a decisive role in collecting intelligence against the Maratha forces.

After the Battle of Panipat the services of the Rohillas were rewarded by grants of Shikohabad to Nawab Faiz-ullah Khan and of Jalesar and Firozabad to Nawab Sadullah Khan. Najib Khan proved to be an effective ruler, who restored Delhi to a large extent. However, after his death on 30 October 1770, the Rohillas were defeated by the forces of the British East India Company in 1774.

To save their kingdom, the Mughals once again changed sides and welcomed the Afghans to Delhi. The Mughals remained in nominal control over small areas of India but were never a force again. The empire officially ended in 1857 when its last emperor, Bahadur Shah II, was accused of being involved in the Indian Rebellion and exiled.

The result of the battle was the temporary halting of further Maratha advances in the north and destabilization of their territories for roughly ten years. This period is marked by the rule of Peshwa Madhavrao, who is credited with the revival of Maratha domination following the defeat at Panipat. In 1771, ten years after Panipat, Mahadji Shinde led a large Maratha army into northern India in a counter offensive in which he along with others re-established the fallen Maratha supremacy in the area and punished refractory powers that had either sided with the Afghans, such as the Rohillas, or had shaken off Maratha domination after Panipat. They desecrated the grave of Rohilla chieftain Najib ad-Dawla and captured Najibabad. But their success was short-lived. Crippled by Madhavrao's untimely death at the age of 28, infighting ensued among Maratha chiefs soon after, and they were ultimately defeated and annexed by the British East India Company administration in 1819.

== Legacy ==
The valour displayed by the Marathas was extolled by Ahmad Shah Abdali in his letter to his ally, Madho Singh, the king of Jaipur.

The Marathas fought with the greatest valour which was beyond the capacity of other races... These dauntless blood-shedders did not fall short in fighting and doing glorious deeds.... Suddenly the breeze of victory began to blow... and the wretched Deccanis suffered defeat.

The battle was referred to in Rudyard Kipling's poem "With Scindia to Delhi".

Our hands and scarfs were saffron-dyed for signal of despair,
When we went forth to Paniput to battle with the ~Mlech~,
Ere we came back from Paniput and left a kingdom there.

It is, however, also remembered as a scene of valour on both sides. Atai Khan, the adopted son of the Wazir Shah Wali Khan, was said to have been killed during this time when Yeshwantrao Pawar climbed atop his elephant and struck him down. Santaji Wagh's corpse was found with over 40 mortal wounds.

== In popular culture ==
- Bengali poet Kaykobad wrote a long poem Mahashmashan based on this battle.
- Bengali playwright Munier Choudhury’s play Roktakto Prantor (1959) is based on the Third Battle of Panipat.
- Panipat, a 2005 novel in Marathi by Indian writer Vishwas Patil is about this battle.
- The 2019 Indian film Panipat, directed by director Ashutosh Gowariker, starring Arjun Kapoor, Sanjay Dutt and Kriti Sanon is based on the Third Battle of Panipat with several major historical inaccuracies.

== See also ==
- First Battle of Panipat
- Second Battle of Panipat
- Maratha Peshwa and Generals from Bhat Family
- Afghan–Sikh Wars
