= Buana Lakhu =

- Village
- Location in Haryana, India Buana Lakhu (India)
- Coordinates: 29.2245°N 76.8404°E
- Country: India
- State: Haryana
- District: Panipat

Government
  - Type: Municipal Corporation
  - Body: Municipal Corporation Panipat
- Elevation: 221 m (725 ft)
- Time zone: UTC+5:30 (IST)
- PIN: 132107, Israna Postal Head Office

Buana Lakhu is a village located in the tehsil Israna of the Panipat district in the state of Haryana in India. It belongs to the Rohtak division. It is located 19 kilometres (12 mi) south of the district headquarters Panipat and 189 kilometres (117 mi) from the state capital Chandigarh.
