= Battle of Taraori (1759) =

Maratha-Afghan battle

- Part of the Afghan–Maratha conflicts
Date	24 December 1759
Location	Taraori, Karnal district
Result	Durrani victory

Belligerents
Durrani Empire	Maratha Empire; Mughal Empire

Commanders and leaders
Ahmad Shah Durrani; Sardar Jahan Khan; Shah Pasand Khan	Dattaji Rao Scindia; Imad-ul-Mulk

Strength
>5,000 men	Unknown

Casualties and losses
Unknown	400 killed

The Battle of Taraori in 1759 was a military engagement between the Durrani Empire and Maratha Empire and the Mughals in the fields of Taraori, in which the Afghans were victorious.

== Prelude ==
After losing territories in northwest India, Ahmed Shah Durrani sought to avenge that defeat, reclaim his lost land, and punish the Marathas. In October, he invaded India at the invitation of figures from the Mughal Empire, including Shah Waliullah Dehlawi, Madho Singh I and Vijay Singh of Marwar. Durrani, alongside his commander Jahan Khan, left Kandahar with a combined force of 60,000 troops. On October 25th, the Afghans crossed the Indus River. Their arrival panicked the Marathas, who swiftly evacuated Multan, allowing it to fall without resistance. Peshawar was also abandoned. Jahan Khan defeated the Marathas near Rohtas Fort. Another Maratha detachment near Lahore met a similar fate, forcing them to retreat to Batala. The Sikhs in Lahore fiercely resisted the Afghan advance but were ultimately defeated, leading to the capture of the city. Sirhind, too, was deserted and captured by the Afghans on November 27th.

== Battle ==
Abdali had reached Ambala and was kept informed of Maratha movements. The Maratha commander Dattaji Rao Scindia crossed the Yamuna river in order to block the passage to Delhi. Abdali, therefore, marched to battle the Marathas and oust them from Delhi, meanwhile, the Mughal vizier, Imad-ul-Mulk had also moved from Delhi with his troops and joined the Marathas at Karnal; the two armies collided in Taraori on 24 December, and the combined Mughal-Marathas initially gained the upper hand as they routed the Afghans and chased them, Abdali, who was in close contact with his advanced guard, sent his general Shah Pasand Khan with a reinforcement of 5000 suddenly intercepted the pursuers, at this moment, the Mughal soldiers disengaged and deserted the battlefield, the Afghans launched their counterattack and poured the Marathas with Musket fire, two additional detachments to cover their flanks, the marathas fought despretaley, after having broke their formations and surrounded from three sides, the front and the flanks and overwhelmed by superior numbers, the marathas guards were annihilated, leaving 400 killed on the battlefield.

== Aftermath ==
Although Abdali was victorious, he withdrew under the cover of night to avoid taking another unnecessary action, he crossed the Yamuna River and continued his march to Delhi, however, he would encounter another Maratha army and engage with them in the Battle of Barari Ghat.
