= Battle of Barari Ghat =

Maratha-Durrani Empire War of 1760

Battle of Barari Ghat (1760)
- Part of the Afghan–Maratha conflicts
Date	9 January 1760
Location	Burari, Delhi, India
Result	Durrani-Rohilla victory

Belligerents
Durrani Empire; Kingdom of Rohilkhand	Maratha Empire

Commanders and leaders
Ahmad Shāh; Najib-ud-Daula; Sardar Qutb Shah	Dattaji Rao Scindia †; Sabaji Rao Scindia; Jankoji Rao Scindia; Jotiba

Strength
Unknown	80,000 cavalry

Casualties and losses
Unknown	1,000+ killed

The Battle of Barari Ghat बुराडी घाट was a military engagement between the Durrani-Rohilla Afghans and the Marathas army in which the Maratha army was defeated and its leader killed in battle.

== Prelude ==
After his defeat at the hands of the Durranis, Dattaji Rao Scindia retreated to Delhi and reached Sonipat on 29 December. He instructed the Mughal vizier Imad-ul-Mulk to organize Delhi's defenses. But the vizier betrayed him, leaving Delhi defenseless. To make things worst, the peasantry despised the Marathas and were not to be relied on. Anticipating that the next encounter cannot be delayed longer, Dattaji reached Barari Ghat. On January 4, with the Yamuna river separating the two armies, the Maratha soldiers were ordered to stay on all the fords of the Yamuna river to prevent the enemy crossing. On January 6, Dattaji visited Delhi and sent all non-combatants and the families of the Maratha officers to Rewari.

== Battle ==
On the night of January 8–9, Abdali decided to investigate the Marathas defenses and the possibility of crossing the river. Najib ad-Dawlah and other Rohilla chiefs took this venture with a column of camels and small elephants, each carrying a pair of light filed guns and artillery men. They crossed the water channel and took cover, however they were sighted by the Marathas. The Rohilla rear was protected by Afghan horsemen. After reporting this to Dattaji, Sabaji Scindia and his men armed with swords and spears only, crossed the river on the other side to confront the enemy. They were met by a hail of bullets by hidden musketeers from behind the reeds and bushes. Upon learning the danger of the Marathas position, Dattaji rushed to the scene. Without knowing the enemy position, he swooped on the Afghans with a handful of men carrying only swords. However, a bullet struck down Dattaji and killed him. Jankoji Sindhia, who came to aid, was also shot and fell unconscious. Jobita, the younger brother of Dattaji, also fell fighting in the battle. Seeing their commander killed, the maratha army, demoralised and disheartened, left the battlefield in order to save their lives, having suffered over a thousand casualties. Most of the Marathas made it to Delhi but they were pursued by the Afghans and the Rohillas who cut down many of the retreating Marathas. Qutbshah Rohilla, the preceptor of Najib Khan found the corpse of Dattaji and decapitated and was shown to both Najib and Abdali.

== Aftermath ==
The victorious Afghans entered the city of Delhi on 9 January while still chasing the retreating Marathas. The city has already been deserted by the majority of its populace and the remaining shut themselves behind their doors. Imad-ul-Mulk alongside the entire Mughal Bureaucracy and soldiery and the Red fort was left un-defended and the Afghans place Shah Jahan III as the new emperor of the Mughals, declaring that he's under protection by Abdali and instructed his Lieutenants not to put the emperor to any embarrassment.
