= Battle of Delhi (1757) =

1757 fought between the Maratha Empire and the Rohilla

Battle of Delhi, 1757
- Part of Afghan–Maratha War and Reconquest of North India (1757–1758)
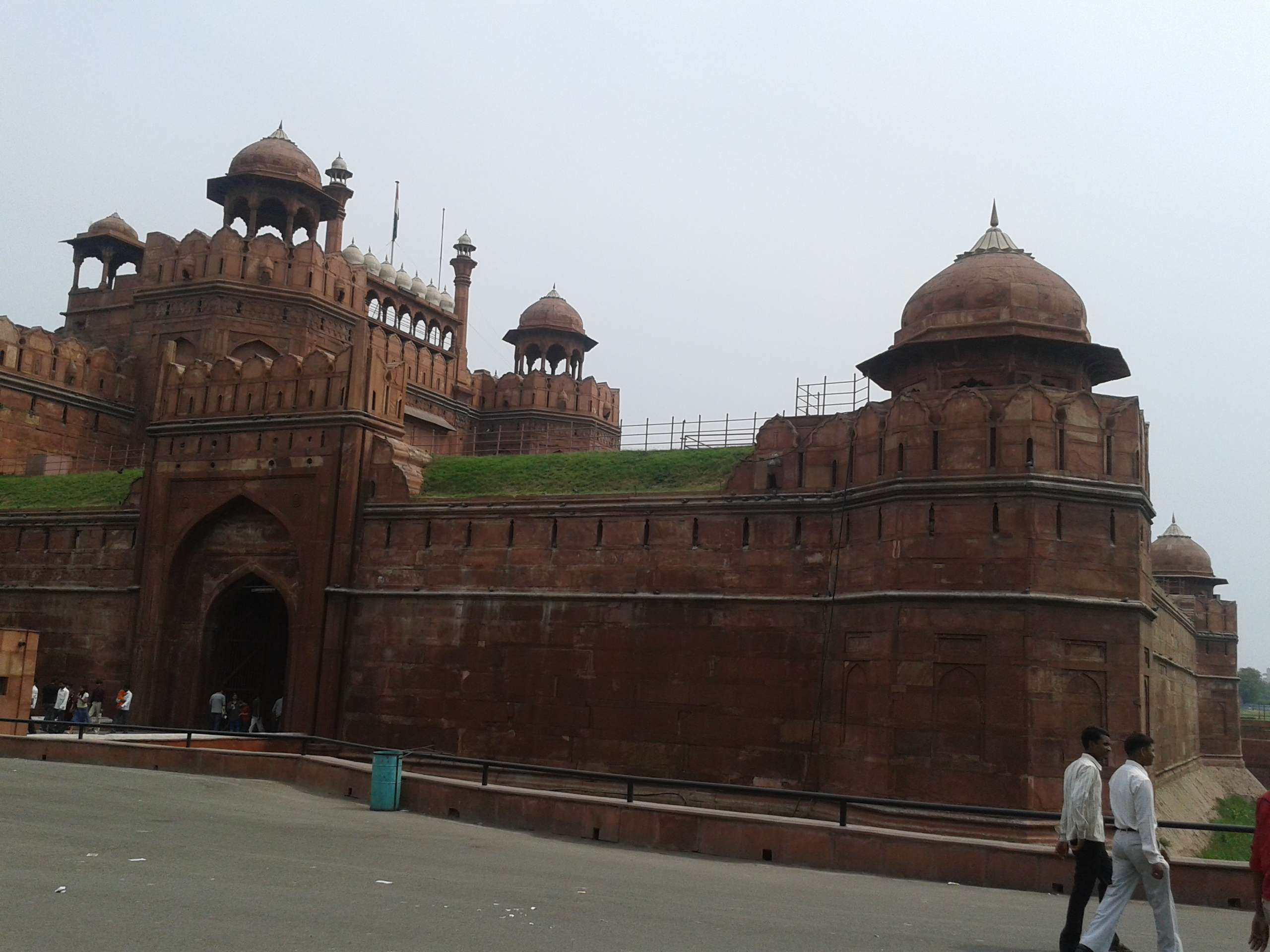
| Date | 11 August – 6 September 1757 |
| Location | Delhi |
| Result | Maratha victory |
| Territorial changes | Delhi captured by the Marathas |

Belligerents
| Maratha Confederacy | Kingdom of Rohilkhand |

Commanders and leaders
| Raghunathrao; Malharrao Holkar; Manaji Paygude; Sakharam Bapu; Dattaji Shinde; Antaji Mankeshwar; Ambaji Ingle | Najib-ud-Daula (POW); Mian Qutb Shah (POW); Mulla Aman Khan (POW) |

Strength
| 40,000+ Infantry and cavalry. + Artillery | 7,500 infantry and Heavy artillery |

Casualties and losses
| Minimum | Heavy |

The Battle of Delhi in 1757 also referred to as the Second Battle of Delhi, was fought on 11 August 1757 between the Maratha Confederacy under the command of Raghunath Rao and the Rohillas under the command of Najib-ud-Daula, who was under the Afghan suzerainty and simultaneously the "Pay Master" of what remained of the Mughal Army. By 1757, Delhi was ruled indirectly by the Marathas. The battle was waged by the Marathas for the control of Delhi, the Mughal capital which was invaded by Rohilla chief Najib-ud-Daula, as a consequence of the fourth invasion of India by Ahmad Shah Abdali.

== Background ==
Ahmad Shah Durrani invaded North India for the fourth time in early 1757. He entered Delhi in January 1757 and kept the Mughal emperor under arrest. On his return in April 1757, Abdali re-installed the Mughal emperor Alamgir II on the Delhi throne as a titular head. However, the actual control of Delhi was given to Najib-ud-Daula, who had promised to pay an annual tribute of two million rupees to Abdali. Najib had also assisted Abdali in his fourth invasion and had already won the trust of the Afghan emperor. It can be said that he worked as the agent of Abdali in Delhi court. So, Najib was now the de facto ruler of Delhi with Alamgir II as a puppet emperor in his control.

The Mughal emperor and his wazir Imad-ul-Mulk were alarmed by these developments. Being a vasal and paying tributary of Marathas, he requested the Marathas to help them get rid of Abdali's agents in Delhi.

== Battle ==
The Marathas encamped opposite the Red Fort on the other side of Yamuna river. Najib gave the charge of 2,500 strong infantry to Qutub Shah and Mulla Aman Khan and himself commanded another infantry contingent of 5,000 elite Afghan troops and heavy artillery, which were deployed by him to prevent the Marathas from entering the city. The battle started on 11 August and after two weeks of intense fighting with heavy Afghan losses, Najib came of the fort with his associates to negotiate a settlement with Holkar but was surrounded and arrested by Marathas.

Maratha commander Raghunath Rao ordered immediate withdrawal of Najib from Delhi along with a tribute of 5 million rupees. Najib also promised that he would never return to Delhi and never threaten any Maratha fort.

== Aftermath ==
The Marathas had now become the de facto rulers of Delhi. Raghunath Rao appointed Antaji Mankeshwar as Governor of Delhi province while Alamgir II was retained as titular head with no actual power.

== See also ==
- Battle of Delhi (disambiguation)
- Battle of Plassey (1757)
- Battle of Karnal
- Decline of the Mughal Empire
  - Sikh attacks on Delhi
  - Maratha conquest of North-west India
