= Maratha–Rajput Wars =

Series of 18th century wars in India

Maratha–Rajput Wars refers to a series of conflicts between the Maratha Confederacy and the various Rajput states in the eighteenth century:

- Battle of Pilsud
- Battle of Lalsot
- Battle of Patan
- Battle of Fatehpur (1799)
