= Ibrahim Khan Gardi =

Muslim General of the Maratha Confederacy

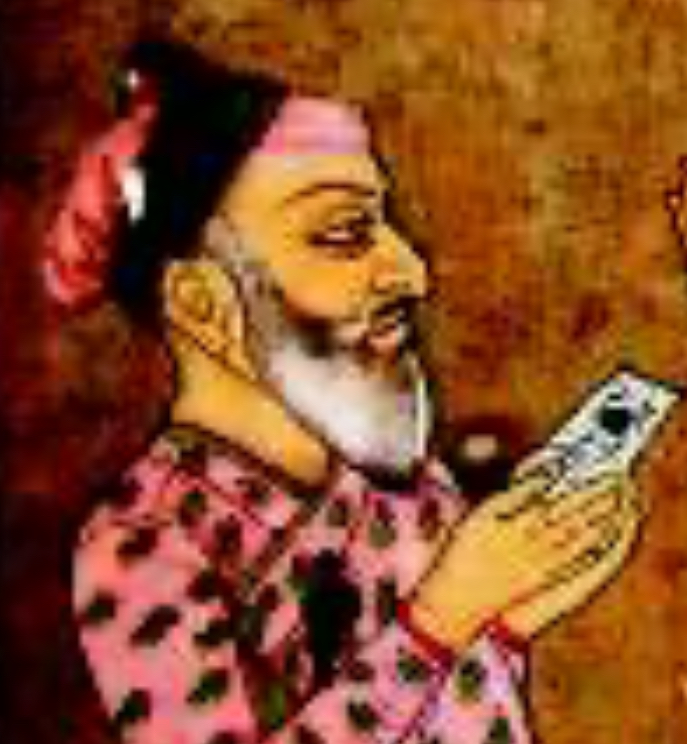
- Ibrahim Khan Gardi with Sadashivrao Bhau
- Died: 14 January 1761 Panipat, Haryana, India
- Allegiance: Maratha Empire; Nizam of Hyderabad
- Service years: Nizam of Hyderabad (1727-1760); Maratha Empire (1760-1761)
- Commands: Third Battle of Panipat (executed); Battle of Kunjpura; Battle of Udgir

Ibrahim Khan Gardi (died 14 January 1761) was a South Indian Muslim general of the Maratha Empire. An expert in artillery, he initially served the Nizam of Hyderabad, before working for the Peshwa of the Maratha Empire. As a Maratha general, he commanded a force of 10,000 men, infantry and artillery. He was captured and killed by the Durrani soldiers during the Third Battle of Panipat in 1761.

== Military career ==
Ibrahim Gardi was a South Indian Muslim soldier of fortune. He was of low origin. He was an expert in artillery and was in service of Nizam of Hyderabad. He served Nizam Ali Khan, Asaf Jah II and was highly attached to him and had participated in the Battle of Palkhed against the Marathas in which the Marathas won. He commanded an army of Hyderabadi Muslims.

=== Training in French discipline ===
He trained to the French discipline as commandant de la garde to de Bussy, a souvenir of his professional origin or title. He was originally part of Hyderabad Nizam's army. His troops' military prowess and artillery tactics were considered a great advantage in various campaigns.

=== In service of Marathas ===
Ibrahim Khan was won over by the Peshwa of the Maratha Empire in 1760, and he soon joined the services of the Peshwa to command a battalion having strength of 10,000 men consisting of cavalry, infantry, artillery, archers (including bowmen and pikemen), and bayonet wielding musketeers, compared to the total strength of Nizam's entire army which was no more than 2,000 men. This was a windfall for Ibrahim Khan and he was the first person to reach the highest level of becoming deputy commander-in-chief as well as in charge of the artillery in one of the powerful Maratha armies.

He was a close confidant of the Peshwa as well as his cousin Sadashivrao Bhau, the commander-in-chief of the Maratha army during the Panipat military expedition.

=== Third Battle of Panipat ===
On the morning of 14 January 1761, Ibrahim Khan rode up to Sadashivrao Bhau and after saluting him, he said, "You have long been displeased with me, for insisting on the regular monthly pay for my people; this month your treasure was plundered, and we have not received any pay at all; but never mind that; this day I will convince you that we have not been paid so long without meriting it." He immediately spurred his horse, and returning to his division.

Sadashivrao Bhau along with Ibrahim Khan had planned and were executing a foolproof battle strategy to pulverise the enemy formations with cannon fire and not to employ his cavalry until the Afghans were thoroughly softened up. With the Afghans now broken, he'd move camp in a defensive formation towards Delhi, where they were assured supplies.

Abdali had given a part of his army the task of surrounding and killing the under Ibrahim Khan, who were at the leftmost part of the Maratha army. Bhau had ordered Vitthal Vinchurkar (with 1500 cavalry) and Damaji Gaikwad (with 2500 cavalry) to protect. However, after seeing the fight, they lost their patience, became overenthusiastic and decided to fight the Rohillas themselves. Thus they broke the round. This was because they were not experienced in fighting in such formations and is regarded as an instance of inexperience of the Maratha army in engaging in pitched battles. Hence, they didn't follow the idea of round battle and went all out on the Rohillas.

This gave the Rohillas the opportunity to encircle and outflank the Maratha centre while Shah Wali pressed on attacking the front. Thus they were left defenceless and started falling one by one. This incident is also regarded as an instance where the Maratha army could not harmonise their light cavalry with their artillery supported infantry.

It was Ibrahim Khan's battalion which faced and repulsed the Afghan onslaught during the battle. All of the Afghan attacks failed to dislodge the battalion from its defensive positions. About 12,000 Afghan cavalry and infantrymen lost their lives in this opening stage of the battle. Around 45,000 men from the Durrani army of Ahmad Shah Durrani lost their lives due to salvos fired at point blank range into the Afghan ranks.

Even when the news of the death of Vishwasrao, the Peshwa's son, reached Ibrahim Khan's battalion it kept defending its position against a numerically stronger Afghan army as, one by one, musketeers fell and the remaining members escaped from the battlefield using the darkness as cover on the night of 14 January 1761.

=== Capture and death ===
Captured in the Third Battle of Panipat, he is alleged to have been brutally tortured before his death by his Afghan captors. Due to Ibrahim Khan's extreme sense of loyalty to his master Sadashivrao Bhau, he fought to the end till he was captured after all his famed Maratha musketeers laid down their lives, one by one, or simply vanished during the night of 14 January 1761 when darkness fell on the battlefield. Some of Ibrahim Khan's artillery detachment with infantry and musketeers kept on fighting while defending their positions until sunset to escape in the darkness of night. To this date, some of the Pardhi communities' folklore have various songs in praise of Ibrahim Khan as well as Suleiman Khan Gardhi.

Ibrahim Khan was caught by Afghans from Shuja-ud-Daula's captivity and brought before Ahmad Shah Durrani in a severely injured condition. According to Kasiraj Pundit, Abdali ordered him to be brought into his presence and insultingly asked him, "How a man of his courage came to be in such a condition?" Ibrahim Khan answered that no man could command his destiny; that his master was killed, and himself wounded and prisoner; but that, if he survived, and his Majesty would employ him in his service, he was ready to show the same zeal.

Ibrahim Khan's courage under attack from Afghan, Oudh and Rohilla forces distinguishes him from others and makes him a memorable hero in folklore and songs in the Deccan region.

His young son was freed by Hafiz Rahmat Khan Barech.

=== Aftermath ===
The family and army of Ibrahim Khan Gardi kept on serving Peshwas as personal guards as well as musketeers until the end of the Peshwa rule in 1818.

After end of the Peshwa's rule, his private army was disbanded by British Raj and some along with others from the Maratha armies joined services of the East India Company as sepoys, musketeers, cavalrymen in infantry and artillery units – especially in The Poona Horse in 1818, Bombay Sappers, Madras Sappers, and Maratha Light Infantry.

== In popular culture ==
Ibrahim Khan Gardhi was portrayed by Mukesh Khanna in TV series The Great Maratha and also portrayed by Nawab Shah in 2019 film Panipat.

== See also ==
- Battle of Panipat (1761)
