= Kunjpura =

Kunjpura 'the heron's nest' बगुले का घोंसला Najabat Naghar
- town
- Location in Haryana, India Kunjpura (India)
- Coordinates: 29°42′57″N 77°04′49″E
- Country: India
- State: Haryana
- District: Karnal

Languages
  - Official: Hindi
- Time zone: UTC+5:30 (IST)
- Postal code: 132022
- ISO 3166 code: IN-HR
- Vehicle registration: HR
- Website: haryana.gov.in

Kunjpura is a town in the Karnal district of the Indian state of Haryana, about 10 km northeast of Karnal city and about 130 km north of the national capital, Delhi. It is on the right bank (west bank) of the Yamuna River, off the Grand Trunk Road that runs from Amritsar to Delhi and further on to Calcutta.

== Overview ==
Kunjpura was founded by Nawab Najabat Khan in 1729. Kunjpura village has a fort with a long history. It was a major halting point for those who traveled from Khyber Pass to Delhi before modern metalled roads came to be. In 1739, an Afghan adventurer, Najabat Khan, was granted a chiefdom by Nadir Shah as nawab at Kunjpura. Kunjpura was won by the forces of Maratha Empire in 1761. A senior secondary school is located at the entry point in this Village.

== Sainik School, Kunjpura ==
The Sainik School situated west of Kunjpura village was started in 1961 on the large property that originally belonged to the last Nawab of Kunjpura, Ibrahim Ali Khan. The property passed into the hands of the Defence Ministry as the nawab migrated to Pakistan after the independence of India and died in Lahore in 1952. The alumni of the school have done well in the Military establishments as well as in the civilian life. The old boys of the school are called Kunjeans.

== People and economy ==
The landowners of the village are of one religion and no caste system. The economy of the village is booming compared to many villages in the state of Haryana. The market is large relative to normal villages and the traders are quite prosperous. This could be attributed to the large buying power of the residents of the Sainik School situated nearby. The soil is alluvial in nature and the Yamuna river is not too far. Thus, irrigation is not an issue for the farmers and they are easily able to harvest more than two crops a year.
