= Govind Pant Bundela =

Maratha general (1710–1760)

Govind Ballal Kher (1710 – 17 December 1760), historically known as Govind Pant Bundela, was a Military General of the Peshwas in Northern India during 1733 to 1760. Peshwa Bajirao appointed him his trustee for the 1/3rd of the kingdom rewarded to him by Maharaja Chhatrasal in Bundelkhand. He ruled the city of Kalpi and later it was given as a jagir to his descendant Nana Govinda Rao. After this Govind Rao ruled over Jalaun State.

== Early life ==
Govind Pant was born in a Karhade Brahmin family in the village ‘Nevare’ in Ratnagiri district of Maharashtra in or around 1710. His father was the Kulkarni of the village and Govind Pant inherited this post after the early death of his father. Being a vagabond, however, he was forced to leave the post and also his hometown and was thus compelled to wander in search of a job.

== Career ==
At the beginning of his career, he worked under the established Maratha Generals of North India: Malharrao Holkar and Antaji Mankeshwar Gandhe. He obtained good experience in guerilla war and administration. On the recommendation by the Deshastha Brahmin Antaji, Bajirao Peshwa assigned some jobs to Govind Pant and found him extremely useful. Soon he became one of Bajirao’s most favorite generals. When Bajirao received Bundelkhand from Maharaja Chhatrasal in 1733, he appointed Govindpant as his Administrator and Power of attorney for this newly annexed land.

He was always known to be the greatest ‘Fund raiser’ of the Maratha Empire.

== Contribution to the Battle of Panipat ==
Govind Pant did his best to help the Maratha army under the leadership of Sadashivrao Bhau during the Battle of Panipat. He himself had trapped Ahmed Shah Abdali in the region between the Ganges and Yamuna (termed as the Doab) and had made him totally helpless. But when Govind got an opportunity he delivered a considerable amount at Delhi to Naro Shankar and started attacking the supplies of Ahmad Shah Abdali. Unfortunately however, a sheer misunderstanding led him to lose his life in an unexpected tussle with the troops of Abdali’s General Ataikhan.

== Controversy ==
Veteran historian V K Rajwade holds Govind Pant responsible for the defeat of the Marathas in the Third Battle of Panipat. He also does not consider Govind a man of importance. Moreover, he accuses him to be always corrupt. Whereas according to Shuresh Sharma, "It was Balaji Bajirao's love of pleasure which was responsible for the loss at Panipat. He waited at Paithan, celebrating his second marriage until December 27, when it was too late."
