= Mian Qutb Shah =

Indian Muslim soldier against Marathas

Mian Qutb Shah or Qutb Khan (died 17 October 1760) was an Indian Muslim Sardar and formerly a collector of Saharanpur, Uttar Pradesh. He was best known as the slayer of Dattaji Rao Scindia.

== Conquest of Sirhind ==
Qutb Khan joined the Mughal emperor's troops in the battle between Ahmad Shah Bahadur and Safdar Jang. He was given the parganahs of Kairana, Barot, Sardhana, and Kandhla by way of pay. When the Wazir Imad-ul-Mulk afterwards gave these territories to the Marathas in a treaty, Qutb Khan felt exasperated and made up his mind to defy the Dehli Emperor. He took to plunder and rape, ravaging Sonipat, Panipat, Karnal, Azimabad, and Thanesar. The imperial army attacked Qutb Khan at Karnal and were on the verge of victory due to their numbers, consisting of nearly 12,000 men against Qutb Khan's small army of 2,500. The complete defeat of the imperial army, attributed to a freak sandstorm, was followed by the seizure of their baggage and materials by Qutb Khan and the plundering of the surrounding regions. Qutb Khan conquered the region of Sirhind from Sadiq Beg and ruled the city of Sirhind and its surrounding districts. He did not molest the poor, but repressed strong rebellious men, so that within his jurisdiction the roads became safe, and his followers were held back from practicing oppression.

== Afghan-Maratha Wars ==
=== Killing of Dattaji ===
Renko Anaji and other Maratha captains captured Saharanpur, driving Qutb Shah to the foot of the Himalayas. Backed by Abdali, Qutb Khan expelled the Marathas from Saharanpur in 1757 and took possession of it. Abdali found in Saharanpur the Rohilla sardars, Qutb Khan, Sadullah Khan, Hafiz Rahmat Khan, Inayet Khan, Dundi Khan, Faizullah Khan, Fath Khan, and Mullah Sardar Khan with 10,000 warriors. Qutb Khan was not a Rohilla by caste, but came to be known as a Rohilla, as the preceptor and fighting ally of the Rohilla Dynasty, In the ensuing battle at the Burari Ghat, Dattaji was defeated and his head was cut off by Mian Qutb Shah. Rajam Chopdar had seen Qutb Shah on top of his elephant, and having known him for long, saluted him in his Muslim tongue, and asked Qutb Shah to save the Patil who was lying on the battlefield. Qutb Shah asked Dattaji whether he would fight him again, and when he heard his reply saying that he would continue to fight, he immediately pulled a dagger from his waist, kicking him, and severed his head from the body, despite the pleas of Chopdar. He presented the head to Abdali.

=== Death ===
The primary purpose for the Third Battle of Panipat for the Marathas was the avenging of the death of Dattaji Sindhia. The Marathas first attacked Kunjpura, where Qutb Shah waited with 2,000 men along with Abdus Samad Khan. Qutb Khan was captured alive, and insults were heaped on him. Qutb Khan asked for water when he was being led to the block, but the Marathas refused, remembering what he had done with the dead body of Dattaji Sindhia. He was subsequently beheaded and paraded around the camp. Qutb Shah's sons slaughtered 4,000 Maratha fugitives at the Third Battle of Panipat, in order to avenge their father's death.
