= 1760 in literature =

This article contains information about the literary events and publications of 1760.

== Events ==
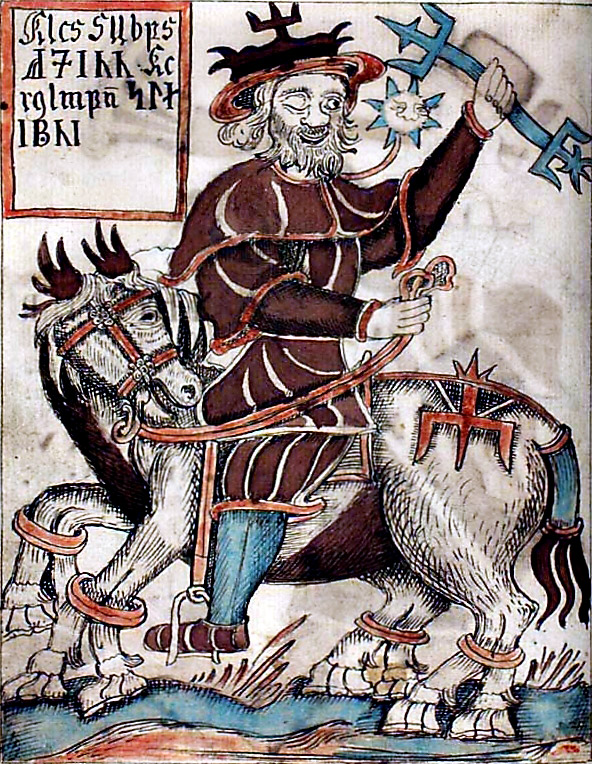
Odin riding Sleipnir, illustration from the Danish Royal Library, MS NKS 1867 4°

- January – Oliver Goldsmith's series of fictionalised "letters from a Chinese philosopher," later collected in The Citizen of the World, begins in The Public Ledger.
- October 25 – With the death of King George II of Great Britain, the era of Augustan literature that started in 1702 is considered to be at an end.
- James Beattie becomes a professor at the University of Aberdeen.
- Fanny Burney and her family move to London, where her father Dr Charles Burney teaches music. In London, Fanny meets Dr Samuel Johnson.
- Jupiter Hammon's poem "An Evening Thought: Salvation by Christ with Penitential Cries" is published as a broadside in British America, making him the first known published African American author.
- The play Edward III is attributed to William Shakespeare by the noted Shakespearean editor Edward Capell in his Prolusions; or, Select Pieces of Ancient Poetry, Compil'd with great Care from their several Originals, and Offer'd to the Publicke as Specimens of the Integrity that should be Found in the Editions of worthy Authors.
- The Danish Royal Library, MS NKS 1867 4° (Den nye kongelige samling) manuscript is written.

== New books ==
=== Fiction ===
- Belinda; Or, Happiness the Reward of Constancy: Mannifested in a Series of the Most Interesting and Surprizing Events Ever Yet Made Publick
- John Cleland – The Romance of a Day
- Sarah Fielding – The History of Ophelia
- Charles Johnstone – Chrysal vols. i–ii
- Tobias Smollett – The Life and Adventures of Sir Launcelot Greaves (serial publication begins)

=== Drama ===
- George Colman the Elder – Polly Honeycombe
- Carlo Goldoni
  - La casa nova
  - I rusteghi
- Samuel Foote – The Minor
- John Home – The Siege of Aquileia
- Arthur Murphy
  - The Desert Island
  - The Way to Keep Him
- George Alexander Stevens – The French Flogged

=== Poetry ===
- James Beattie – Original Poems and Translations
- George Colman the Elder – Odes
- John Delap – Elegies
- Robert Lloyd
  - The Actor
  - The Tears and Triumphs of Parnassus
- George Lyttelton, 1st Baron Lyttelton – Dialogues of the Dead
- James Macpherson as "translator" – Fragments of Ancient Poetry Collected in the Highlands of Scotland
- John Scott – Four Elegies

=== Non-fiction ===
- John Balguy (died 1748) – Sermons, vol. 2
- William Law – Of Justification by Faith and Works
- John Shebbeare – The History of the Sumatrans (satire on the Whigs)
- Tobias Smollett – The British Magazine (periodical)
- Laurence Sterne – The Sermons of Mr. Yorick (the author's sermons)
- William Tytler – An Historical and Critical Inquiry into the Evidence Against Mary Queen of Scots

== Births ==
- March 10 – Leandro Fernández de Moratín, Spanish dramatist and poet (died 1828)
- May 10 – Johann Peter Hebel, German poet and story writer (died 1826)
- June 12 – Jean-Baptiste Louvet de Couvrai, French novelist, playwright and diplomat (died 1797)
- August 28 – István Ballér (Števan Baler), Slovene hymnist and Lutheran minister (died 1835)
- October 1 – William Thomas Beckford, English novelist and travel writer (died 1844)
- October 25 – Arnold Hermann Ludwig Heeren, German historian (died 1842)
- October 26 – Maria Petronella Woesthoven, Dutch poet (died 1830)
- March 2 – Christina Charlotta Cederström, Swedish poet (died 1832)
- Unknown date:
  - Alecu Beldiman, Moldavian poet-chronicler and translator (died 1826)
  - Emma Jane Greenland, English painter, writer (died 1838)

== Deaths ==
- February 5 – Browne Willis, English antiquary and writer (born 1682)
- February 14 – Isaac Hawkins Browne, English poet and politician (born 1705)
- April 6 – Charlotte Charke, English novelist and dramatist (born 1713)
- April 10 – Jean Lebeuf, French historian (born 1687)
- November 30 – Friederike Caroline Neuber, German actor-manager (born 1697)
