= Tryambak Shankar Shejwalkar =

Indian historian and essayist

- Born: 25 May 1895; Kasheli, Ratnagiri, Maharashtra, India
- Died: 28 November 1963 (aged 68); Pune, Maharashtra, India
- Education: • Wilson College, Mumbai (B.A.) • Deccan College (Professional work)
- Occupations: Historian, essayist, professor
- Relatives: Shashikant Shejwalkar (Nephew)
- Writing career
- Subject: History
- Notable works: Panipat 1761 (in English and Marathi)
- Notable awards: Sahitya Akademi Award (1966)

Tryambak Shankar Shejwalkar (25 May 1895 – 28 November 1963) was an Indian historian and essayist.

== Biography ==
Shejwalkar was born in Kasheli, a village in Rajapur Taluka of Ratnagiri district. He passed matriculation examination in 1911 from a school run by the Aryan education society. Later he completed a Bachelor of Arts at Wilson College, Mumbai.

His first job was in military accounts department from May 1918 to June 1921. He worked in Deccan College from August 1939 until 25 May 1955. Despite his retirement, he continued to work at Deccan College until his death.

He was associated with Bharat Itihas Sanshodhak Mandal from 1918 onwards. There he came in contact with other historians like Datto Vaman Potdar, Govind Sakharam Sardesai and Dattopant Apte.

== Professional history ==
Shejwalkar primarily wrote in the Marathi language, and was the founder-editor of now defunct Marathi periodical Pragati (1929–1932). Shejwalkar was also the Reader of Maratha History at Deccan College from 1939-1955. Shejwalkar's topics included historical, sociological and contemporary issues ranging from Vijayanagara Empire to Mahatma Gandhi, Marathi speaking poet-saints to decay of Brahminism and the work of Arnold J. Toynbee.

Shejwalkar claimed that he ghostwrote G S Sardesai's book "Nanasaheb Peshwa".

His biggest regret at the time of his death was that he could not complete the biography of Chatrapati Shivaji Maharaj.

=== Essays ===
Shejwalkar wrote essays on life and work of Swami Dayananda Saraswati, Mahadev Govind Ranade, Kashinath Trimbak Telang, Swami Vivekananda, Gopal Ganesh Agarkar, Bal Gangadhar Tilak, Lala Lajpat Rai, Bhagat Singh, Rajguru, Sukhdev, Vishwanath Kashinath Rajwade, Shridhar Venkatesh Ketkar among many others.

=== Third Battle of Panipat ===
Shejwalkar was the first historian to study the Third Battle of Panipat in great detail, personally traveling to all places relevant to the battle. He argues that the battle was fought to save the Mughal Empire and that the Marathas were sacrificed for the cause of Timur's successors. He further argues that if Jawaharlal Nehru had shown willingness for similar sacrifice, India may not have been divided in 1947.

== Authorship ==
- "Tryambak Shankar Shejwalkar- Nivadak Lekhsangrah" by T S Shejwalkar (collection- H V Mote, Introduction- G D Khanolkar) 1977 (Marathi)
- Panipat 1761: Deccan College Publication, Pune 1946
- Nagpur Affairs, Part I: Deccan College Publication, Pune 1954
- Nagpur Affairs, Part II: Deccan College Publication, Pune 1959
- Panipat 1761 : Joshi Ani Lokhande Prakashan, Pune, 1961 (Marathi)
- Dattopant Apte-Vyakti Darshan, 1945 (Marathi)
- Nijam-Peshwe Sambandh, 1959 (Marathi)
- Kokanchya Itihasachi Parshvabhumi, 1961 (Marathi)
- Shiv Chhatrapati: Sankalpit Shivcharitrachi Prastavana, Arakhada va sadhane, 1964 (Marathi)
