= Deccan College Post-Graduate and Research Institute =

Post-graduate institute in India

Deccan College Post-Graduate & Research Institute
- Type: Public Deemed University
- Established: 6 October 1821; 204 years ago
- Chancellor: Dr. Bhushan Patwardhan
- Vice-Chancellor: Pramod Pandey
- Location: Pune, Maharashtra, India
- Website: www.dcpune.ac.in

Deccan College Post-Graduate and Research Institute, also referred to as Deccan College, is a public deemed university and a post-graduate institute of Archeology, Linguistics and Sanskrit & Lexicography in Pune, India. Recently, in May 2026, Dr. Bhushan Patwardhan, who is a biomedical scientist has been appointed as the Chancellor of the college.

== History ==
=== Early years (1821 to 1939) ===
Established on 6 October 1821 as Hindoo College, it is one of the oldest institutions of modern learning in India. It was started under Mountstuart Elphinstone (Lt. Governor of Bombay Presidency), with funds diverted from the erstwhile Peshwa's Dakshina Fund, later disbursed by Sardar Khanderao Dabhade after the Territories of the Peshwa were annexed in 1818. It was also known as the Poona Sanskrit College. The first principal was Major Thomas Candy.

In 1837, English and other modern subjects were added to the curriculum. An English school was added to the college in 1842; on 7 June 1851 the English school was merged with the Hindoo College to form Poona College. In 1857, the principal was Sir Edwin Arnold, followed by W.A. Russell in 1860.

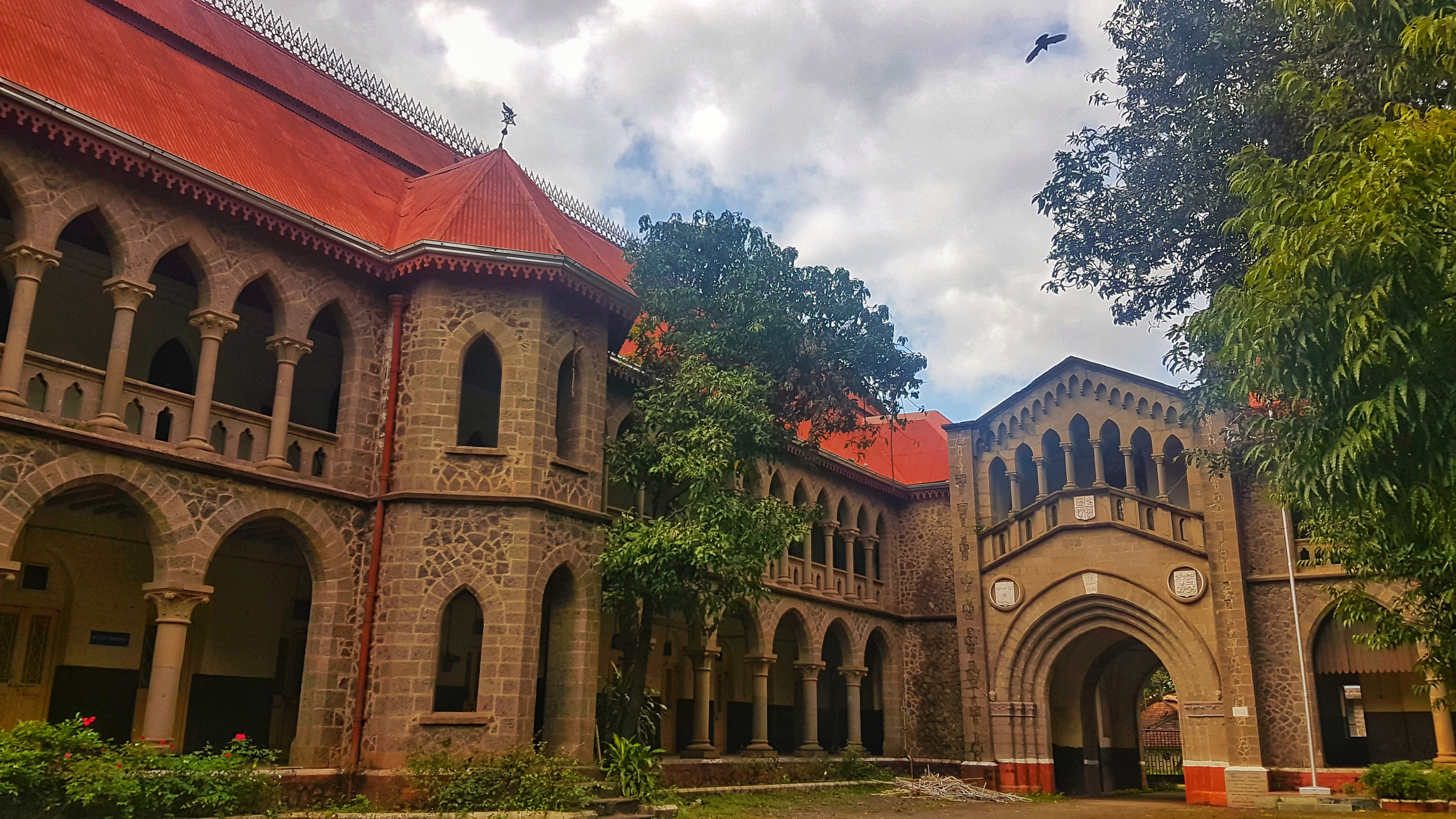
Building of Deccan College at its campus in Yerwada

From its original location in Vishrambaug Wada and later in Wanwadi, the Poona College was shifted to its present large campus near Yerwada. The land was donated by the Bombay government. The foundation stone of the main building was laid on 15 October 1864. A Victorian neo-Gothic building was constructed by Sir Henry Bartle Frere with a munificent 1,00,000 rupees from Sir Jamsetjee Jejeebhoy, 2nd Baronet, between Kirkee and Yerwada.

The college started functioning on the new campus on 23 March 1868. At this stage it was renamed as Deccan College in recognition of the enrollment of students from the entire Deccan region. Until 1881, Deccan College was staffed by four professors, one acting as principal. Another of the four, the professor of Oriental languages, supervised five traditional Sanskrit shastris and an expert in Zend Pahlevi in an extensive program of research and text publication, in addition to his teaching duties. Student enrollment rose to a peak of 210 in 1885. William Wordsworth (grandson of the poet William Wordsworth) and E.A. Wodehouse (brother of P.G. Wodehouse) were principals of the college during 1862-74 and 1934-39 respectively.

=== Recent history (1939 till present) ===
Deccan College temporarily shut down its teaching activities in 1934 due to lack of funding. It was reopened by order of the Bombay High Court on 17 August 1939 as a post-graduate and research institute for promoting higher learning and research in Indology and Social Sciences. The re-opened institute originally had four teaching and research departments: Archaeology, Linguistics, History, and Sociology-Anthropology.

A Transfer Deed was passed by the Hon’ble Bombay High Court on 16 August 1939 by which the court enjoined the state government to run the institute in perpetuity. As per the Transfer Deed the Deccan College Poona Trust came into existence in which were vested the properties including the land and buildings. In accordance with the provision in the Transfer Deed, the appointments of the Trustees today are made by the State Government.

It was incorporated by the Poona University (now University of Pune) in 1948, becoming one of its recognized institutions.

The state government was entrusted with preparing the rules for the administration and management of the Deccan College Post-Graduate and Research Institute, which was to cater to studies in post-graduate and research in heritage-related subjects. Thus the Management Council came into existence. In the next half-century the institute, apart from giving instruction to postgraduate students and producing over 500 PhD dissertations, carried out outstanding research in Ancient Indian History, Culture and Archaeology, Linguistics, Medieval and Maratha History, Sociology-Anthropology and Sanskrit Studies.

In recognition of the excellence achieved by the institute in teaching and research, the H.R.D. Ministry, Government of India, awarded it the status of a Deemed University on 5 March 1990. It started functioning as Deemed University from 1 June 1994. Since then the institute has conducted its own courses for M.A. degree and P.G. diploma in Archaeology, M.A. degree in Linguistics, and M.A. degree in Sanskrit and Lexicography, and has enrolled a large number of students for the PhD degree in these disciplines.

Currently, Deccan College has three teaching and research departments: Archaeology, Linguistics and Sanskrit and Lexicography. On the premises are two museums: the Museum of Maratha History, and the Museum of Archaeology. As of 2016, it is currently involved in the ongoing multi-year excavation of the largest Indus Valley civilization site of Rakhigarhi in Hisar district of Haryana.

== Extra-academic ==
Deccan College had the oldest boat club in India, called the Poonah Boat Club. The site has since been discontinued and is completely overrun by the slums behind Shadal Baba Dargah.

== Notable professors ==
- Edward Hamilton Aitken
- Edwin Arnold
- F.W. Bain
- R.G. Bhandarkar (Acting Professor of Sanskrit, 1889–90, and Permanent Professor of Sanskrit, 1882-1893)
- Madhukar Keshav Dhavalikar
- Shivram Dattatray Joshi
- Narayan Govind Kalelkar
- Irawati Karve
- Sumitra Mangesh Katre
- Lorenz Franz Kielhorn (Professor of Sanskrit, 1866–82)
- V.N. Misra
- Syed Sulaiman Nadvi
- K. Paddayya
- Hasmukh Dhirajlal Sankalia (Professor in Proto- and Ancient Indian History, 1939-1985)
- Tryambak Shankar Shejwalkar
- Madhukar Keshav Dhavalikar (Reader in Ancient Indian History Culture and Archaeology, 1967-1980, Professor, 1980-1990, Joint-Director, 1982–1985, Director, 1985–1990)
- Uliyar Padmanabha Upadhyaya, linguist

== Notable alumni ==
- Gopal Ganesh Agarkar
- Pandurang Mahadev Bapat
- Vishnu Narayan Bhatkhande
- Vishnushastri Krushnashastri Chiplunkar
- P. B. Gajendragadkar
- Meher Baba
- Shripad Krushna Kolhatkar
- Moropant Vishvanath Joshi
- Narasimha Chintaman Kelkar
- Dwarkanath Kotnis
- Vishwanath Kashinath Rajwade
- Ramchandra Dattatreya Ranade
- Bhawani Singh of Pokhran
- Bal Gangadhar Tilak

== See also ==
- List of Sanskrit universities in India
- Sanskrit revival
