= The Connoisseur (newspaper) =

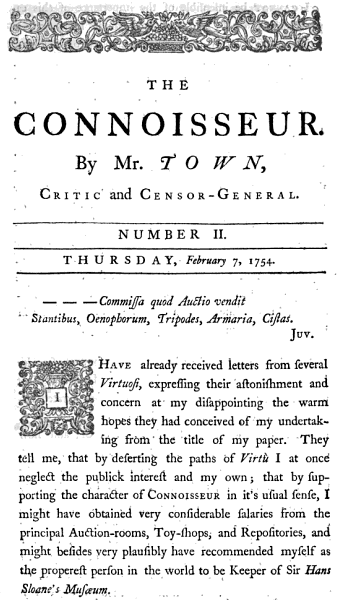
The Connoisseur, 1754

The Connoisseur (by Mr. Town [pseud.], Critic, and Censor-General. 2 vols. 140 nos. (31 January 1754 – 30 September 1756), was a London weekly eighteenth century newspaper founded and chiefly run by George Colman the Elder and the parodist Bonnell Thornton as a 'plebeian' counterpart to Edward Moore's The World, a periodical of about the same time, which dealt more with the interests of aristocrats. James Boswell says in his Life of Johnson:

I mentioned the periodical paper called 'THE CONNOISSEUR'. He said it wanted matter. – No doubt it had not the deep thinking of Johnson's writings. But surely it has just views of the surface of life, and a very sprightly manner. His opinion of 'THE WORLD' was not much higher than of 'THE CONNOISSEUR'.

The Connoisseur was issued as a weekly folio every Thursday. Among its discreet contributors were Thomas Warton, William Cowper, and Robert Lloyd. One essay appeared in each issue "aimed at the vices and follies of the community ... It was often in poor style and lacking in substance, faults that may be fairly attributed to the inexperience of its authors (Coleman was twenty-two and Thornton thirty) and their youthful predilection to satire".
