= Nonsense Club =

The Nonsense Club was a scandalous club of 18th-century British satirists centred on Westminster School. Its members included the satirists and poets Charles Churchill and Robert Lloyd, the parodist Bonnell Thornton, the nature poet William Cowper, and the dramatist George Colman. Some of the group's meetings may also have been attended by William Hogarth. The club engaged in a host of colourfully virulent literary and theatrical battles, produced a distinctive brand of satire, and combined its impact with that of Wilkes to foment some of the most important political debates of its time.
