= Kalelkar =

Kalelkar is an Indian surname. Notable people with the surname include:

- Kaka Kalelkar (1885–1981), Indian independence activist and social reformer
- Narayan Govind Kalelkar (1909–1989), Indian linguist
