= The Oxonian in Town =

1767 play

- Original language: English
- Written by: George Colman the Elder
- Genre: Comedy
- Setting: London, present day

Premiere
- Date: 7 November 1767
- Place: Theatre Royal, Covent Garden, London

The Oxonian in Town is a 1767 play by George Colman the Elder. It premiered on 7 November 1767 at the Theatre Royal, Covent Garden in London and was later published in 1769. The original Covent Garden cast included Henry Woodward as Careless, Robert Bensley as Knowell, John Quick as Post Boy, John Cushing as Waiter and Isabella Mattocks as Lucy. It premiered in Ireland at the Capel Street Theatre in Dublin on 3 March 1774.

== Synopsis ==
A satire, the work depicts a naive student of Oxford University travelling south to London where he becomes mixed up with shady company, only to be rescued by a fellow undergraduate from Oxford.

== Bibliography ==
- Greene, John C. Theatre in Dublin, 1745-1820: A Calendar of Performances, Volume 6. Lexington Books, 2011.
- Kinservik, Matthew J. Disciplining Satire: The Censorship of Satiric Comedy on the Eighteenth-Century London Stage. Associated University Presses, 2002.
- Wormersley, David. Gibbon and the 'Watchmen of the Holy City': The Historian and his Reputation, 1776–1815. Oxford University Press, 2002.
