= The Manager in Distress =

1780 comedy stageplay

The Manager in Distress is a 1780 comedy play by George Colman the Elder. It was written to open the summer season at the Haymarket Theatre on 30 April 1780. A theatre manager learns that his actors have all left him, meaning he has to cancel his season of plays, only for them to turn up after all. The play is full of in-jokes including references to Colman himself.

== Bibliography ==
- Smith, Dane Farnsworth. Plays about the Theatre in England, 1737-1800: or, The Self-conscious Stage from Foote to Sheridan. Associated University Presses, 1979.
