= The Jealous Wife =

1761 British play by George Colman the Elder

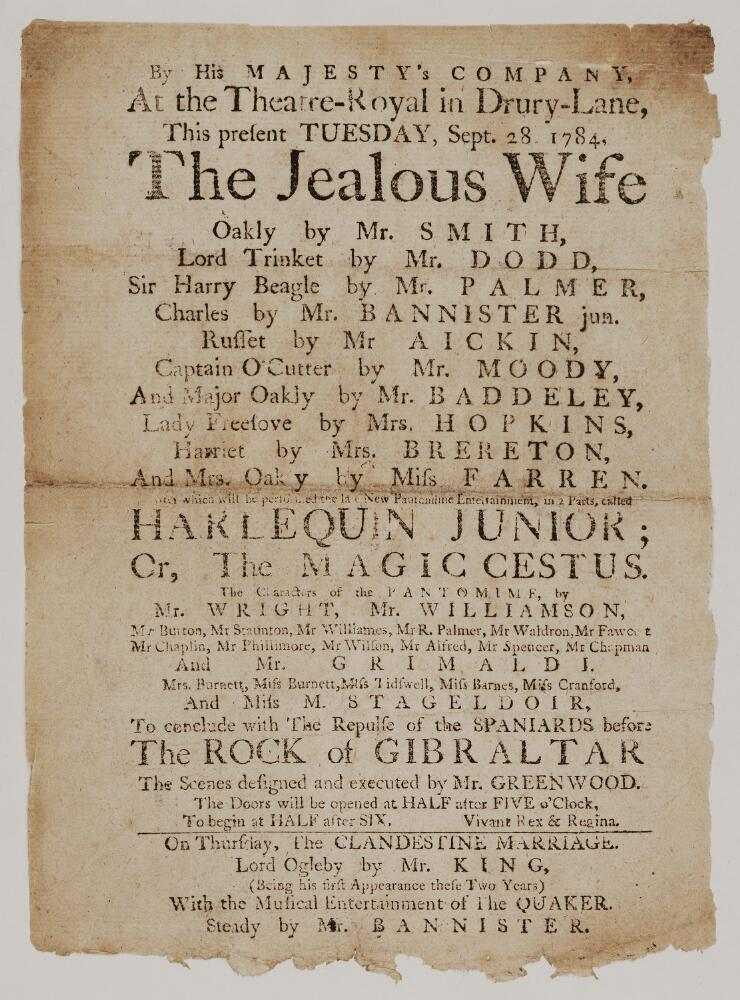
1784 playbill for The Jealous Wife at Theatre Royal, Drury Lane

The Jealous Wife is a 1761 British play by George Colman the Elder. A comedy, it was first performed at the Drury Lane Theatre on 12 February 1761 and ran for 19 performances in its first season and 70 by the end of the century. It was translated into French and German.

Colman was indebted to Henry Fielding's novel Tom Jones as an inspiration for several characters and incidents and is an early example of a dramatisation of a popular novel. An Advertisement preceding The Jealous Wife in Colman's Dramatick Works of 1777 reveals that he also developed ideas for the play from The Spectator, The Connoisseur and The Adelphi of Terrance. David Garrick helped Colman to work on the draft and cut down its length.
