= Cadbury, Somerset =

Cadbury, Somerset may refer to:

- North Cadbury
- South Cadbury
- Cadbury Castle, Somerset
