= Maharashtriya Jnanakosha =

Maharashtriya Dnyanakosha(Devanagari:महाराष्ट्रीय ज्ञानकोश, IAST:Mahārāṣṭrīya dñyānakośa) is the first encyclopaedia in the Marathi language. Shridhar Venkatesh Ketkar was the chief editor the encyclopedia. Work began in 1916 and it was completed in 1928.

== Structure ==
The encyclopaedia was published in 23 volumes. The first five volumes are introductory, and consist of a series of lengthy articles on various sociological and historical subjects. They are titled as follows:

- Volume 1: Hindustan ani Jaga (हिंदुस्तान अाणि जग, India and the World)
- Volume 2: Vedavidya (वेदविद्या, Vedic Knowledge)
- Volume 3: Buddhapurva Jaga (बुद्धपूर्व जग, The World Before Buddha)
- Volume 4: Buddhotar Jaga (बुद्धोत्तर जग, The World After Buddha)
- Volume 5: Vijnanetihas (विज्ञानेतिहास, History of Sciences)

Volumes 6 through 21 consist of an alphabetically arranged series of short articles (as in a conventional encyclopaedia). Volume 22 is the index (सूची), and finally volume 23 (Hindusthan, हिंदुस्थान) contains some additional information about India.

== Availability on the internet ==
The entire encyclopedia is made available on the internet by Yashwantrao Chavan Pratishthan, Mumbai. Some articles are updated. As of 09/October/2021 the website is private and requires User ID and Password for login.
