= Govind Sakharam Sardesai =

Indian historian (1865–1959)

Rao Bahadur, Riyasatkar Govind Sakharam Sardesai
- Born: 17 May 1865; Govil, Ratnagiri District, Maharashtra
- Died: 29 November 1959 (aged 94); Kamshet, Pune, Maharashtra
- Occupations: Historian, writer
- Writing career
- Notable awards: Rao Bahadur (1937); Padma Bhushan (1957)

Signature
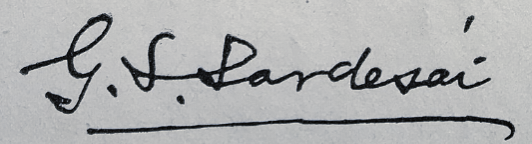

Rao Bahadur Govind Sakharam Sardesai (17 May 1865 – 29 November 1959), popularly known as Riyasatkar Sardesai, was an Indian historian based in Bombay Presidency, India.

Through his Riyasats written in Marathi, Sardesai presented an account of over 1,000 years of Indian history until 1848. He also wrote the three-volume New History of Marathas in English.

Sardesai's work was recognised with a Padma Bhushan award from the Government of India in 1957.

== Biography ==
Sardesai was born in a middle-class Brahmin family in the village of Govil in Ratnagiri District. He received his high school education in Ratnagiri, and college education in Pune and Mumbai. Then he joined the service of the princely state of Baroda in 1889. Shortly thereafter, Maharaja Sayajirao Gaekwad III appointed him as his personal secretary, and subsequently as a tutor of the princes.

With encouragement from the Maharaja and being able to access the large collection of books and historical papers in the royal library, Sardesai compiled voluminous historical data and wrote several books.

He often accompanied the Maharaja during the latter's trips to the UK, US, and Europe; this helped Sardesai to broaden his outlook of history.

Sardesai wrote eight volumes of Marathi Riyasat, three volumes of Musalmani Riyasat, and two volumes of British Riyasat.

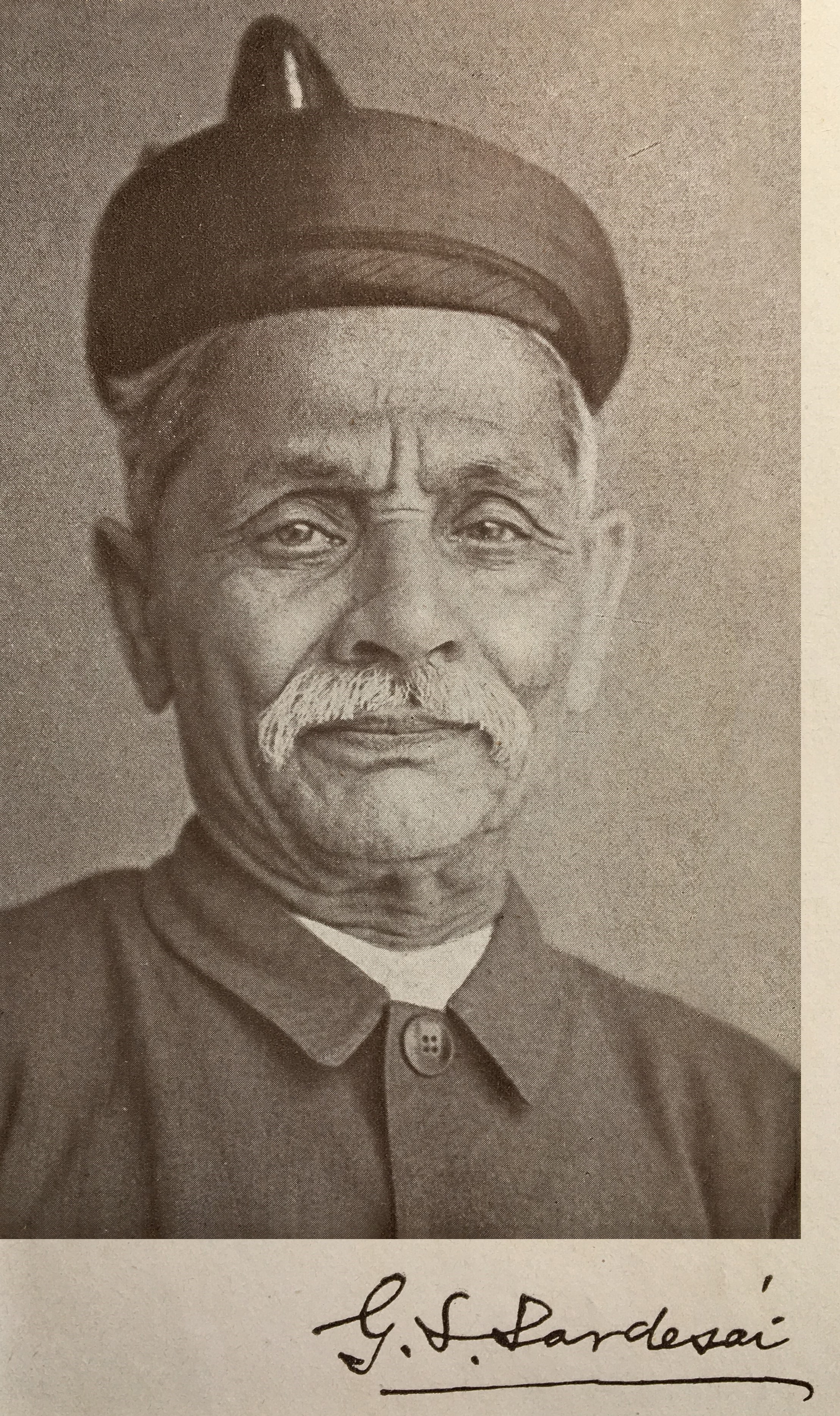
Sardesai, with signature, about 1938

The historian Tryambak Shankar Shejwalkar had worked as his assistant in the above endeavour. Shejwalkar had written the preface to one of his volumes on the Peshwas; Sardesai had asked him to write the preface because Shejwalkar held some contrary historical views.

After retiring from the service of Baroda state in 1925, Sardesai settled in the village of Kamshet near Pune. In accord with a suggestion from Jadunath Sarkar, the government of Bombay asked Sardesai to take up the work of editing and publishing the Peshwa daftar. He examined almost 35,000 documents, with 27,332 of these written in Modi Marathi; 7,482 in English; 129 in Gujarati; and 29 in Persian. Subsequently, he published 45 volumes of the Peshwa daftar, 7,801 pages long in total and covering 8,650 documents.

Later, jointly with Sarkar, Sardesai edited and published the Poona Residency Correspondence consisting of 7,193 pages and covering 4,159 letters. With the help of some newly discovered sources, he wrote at age 80, The New History of Marathas.

Sardesai died at Kamshet on 29 November 1959 at the age of 94.

== Works ==
Sardasai wrote all of his works in Marathi except for the last three in the following list, which he wrote in English.

- Musalmani Riyasat
- Marathi Riyasat
- British Riyasat
- Peshwe Daftar
- Aitihasik Wanshawali
- Aitihasik Gharani
- Aitihasik Patrawyawahar
- Aitihasik Patrabodh
- Mahadaji Shinde Yanchi Patre
- Anupuran
- Paramanand Kawyam
- Sardesai Gharanyacha Itihas
- Shyamkantachi Patre
- Poona Residency Correspondence
- Main Currents of Maratha History
- The New History of Marathas

== Honours ==
- 1937 - Honoured with the title 'Rao Bahadur'
- 1946 - Golden Award with the title 'Itihas Martand' at Dhule
- 1947 - Honoured by Baroda State
- 1951 - President, Bharatiya Itihas Parishad
- 1951 - Doctor of Literature conferred by University of Pune
- 1957 - Padma Bhushan award from the Government of India

== See also ==
- List of Historians
- List of historians by area of study
- List of Padmabhushan
- List of Marathi people
- G.B Mehendale
