= Polly Honeycombe =

1760 afterpiece farce by George Colman the Elder

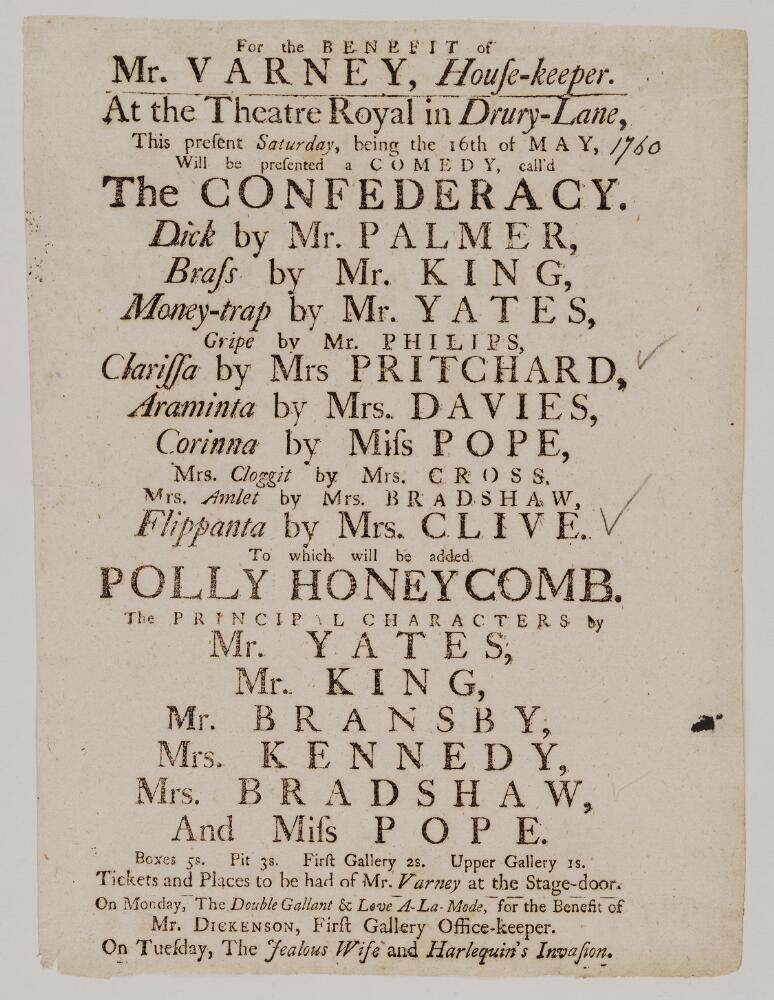
1760 playbill for Polly Honeycombe at Theatre Royal, Drury Lane

Polly Honeycombe is a 1760 afterpiece farce by George Colman the Elder. It comically deals with the effect of novel-reading on not only young women, but on various members of polite 18th-century English society. It was Colman's first play and helped establish his reputation, which he built on with The Jealous Wife the following year.

== Plot summary ==
The title character, Polly Honeycombe, is a young woman who reads many novels from the circulating library. Her expectations for her own future are shaped by the actions and characters in these novels. She tells her nurse that "a novel is the only thing to teach a girl life, and the way of the world." Her father plans to marry her to Ledger, "the rich Jew's wife's nephew," who shares none of Polly's notions of romance. Polly wants, instead to marry Scribble, who is merely an attorney's clerk, but who, like Polly, is self-consciously aware of the ways he follows novelistic conventions of plot and character. When Honeycombe discovers his daughter's intentions, he locks her in her room—an action which Polly recognizes as a typical plot point. Scribble, however, had already been hiding in the room, and the two escape together. Ledger tracks them down and brings them back, only for the family to discover that Polly and Scribble had already begun the process of marrying, according to the 1753 Marriage Act, by pronouncing their bans. The play ends with Honeycombe and Ledger frustrated and Polly and Scribble happily leaving together.

== Original cast included ==
- Mr Honeycombe - Richard Yates
- Mrs Honeycombe - Elizabeth Kennedy
- Scribble - Thomas King
- Nurse - Mary Bradshaw
- Ledger - Astley Bransbury
