= Uliyar Padmanabha Upadhyaya =

Indian Tulu scholar (1932–2020)

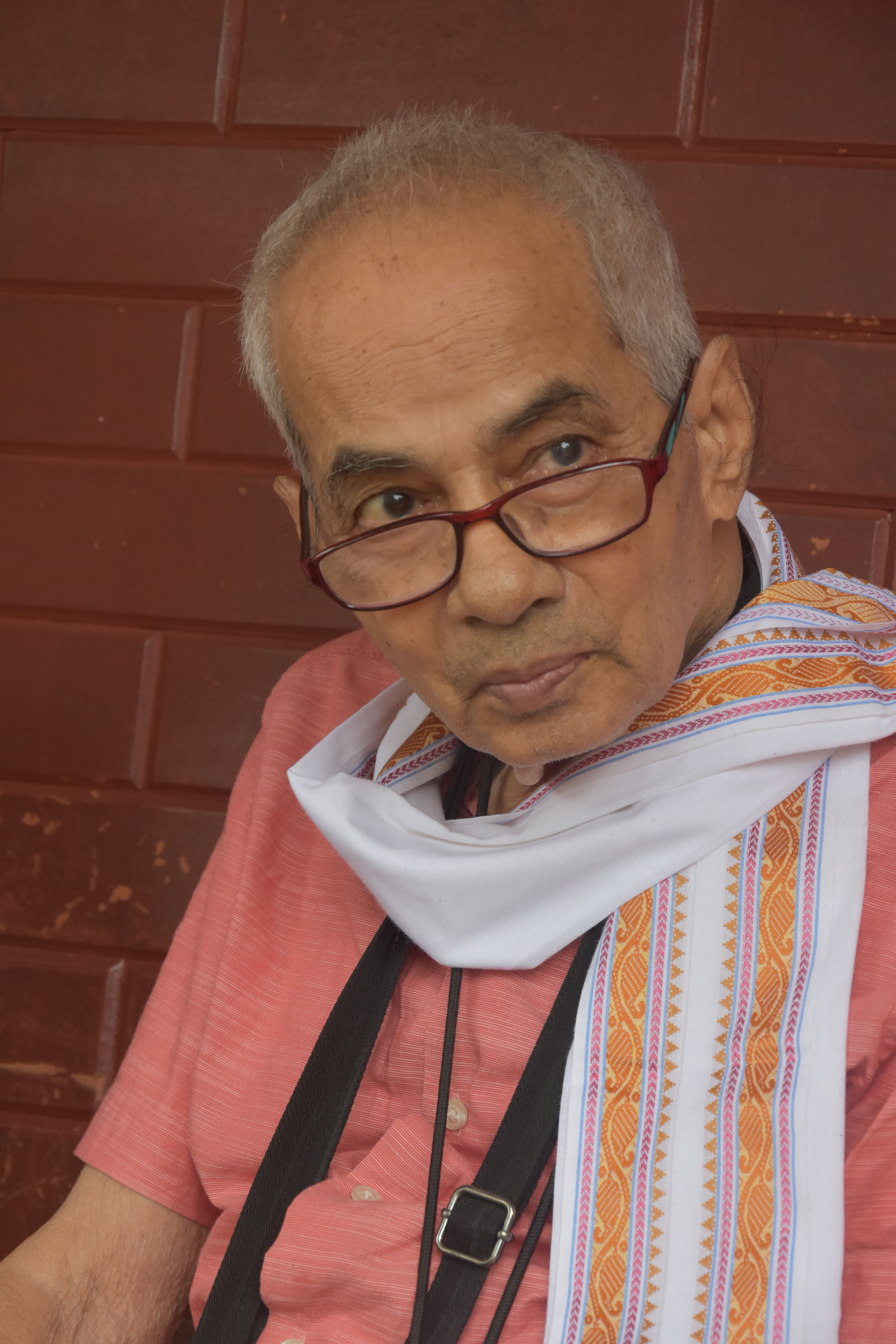
Dr._U._P._Upadhyaya)

Uliyar Padmanabha Upadhyaya (April 10, 1932 – July 17, 2020) was an Indian Tulu scholar. His monumental book, Tulu Lexicon edited by him and his wife, was the standard work in Tulu linguistics.

== Life ==
His father was Sitaram Upadhyaya, a Shivalli Madhva Brahmin priest and reputed scholar in the court of Raja of Travancore. He was native of Uliyargoli near Udupi. He was married to Susheela Upadhyaya who died at 77 and also contributed to Tulu and Kannada literature and culture.

== Career ==
Upadhyaya was a linguist whose subject spanned the languages Tulu, Kannada, Sanskrit, Malayalam, Tamil Hindi, French and English. He started his career in 1958 as the assistant librarian in Oriental manuscript library. He taught at St. Joseph's College, Bangalore and at Deccan College Post-Graduate and Research Institute in Pune for decades. The Rashtrakavi Govinda Pai Samshodana Kendra had published the Lexicon in Udupi. Dr.Uliyar Padmanabha Upadhyaya died on July 17, 2020 He said Tulu language has potential to become a classical language.
