= Edward Lake (priest) =

English clergyman (1641–1704)

Edward Lake (1641–1704) was an English churchman, known as a royal tutor, writer and diarist, and archdeacon of Exeter from 1676.

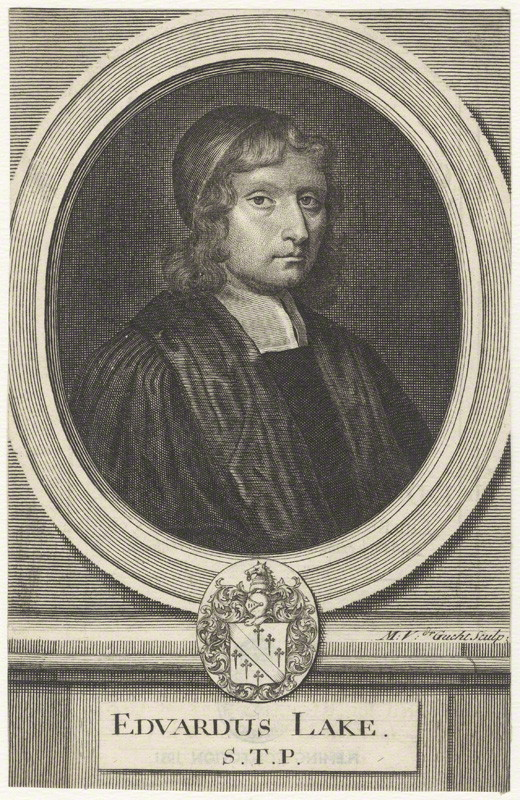
Edward Lake

== Life ==
Born in Exeter on 10 November 1641, Lake was the son of a clergyman, and his early life seems to have been connected with the Earl of Bath's family. In 1658 he entered Wadham College, Oxford, as a commoner, and was elected a scholar in 1659.

About 1670, Lake became chaplain and tutor to the princesses Mary and Anne, the daughters of James, Duke of York. He was made prebendary of Exeter Cathedral on 13 December 1675, and archdeacon of Exeter on 24 Oct. 1676. In 1676 he was created D.D. at Cambridge by royal mandate. On 5 January 1681, he was elected a brother of St. Katharine's Hospital, of which he was also a commissary, resigning in 1698. On 30 November 1682 he was instituted to the rectory of St. Mary-at-Hill, to which was annexed in 1700 that of St. Andrew Hubbard.

Lake was an admired preacher. He died on 1 February 1704, and was buried in St. Katharine, Tower Hill, where there was an inscribed monument.

== Works ==
Lake wrote, for the use of his royal pupils, Officium Eucharisticum. A preparatory service to a devout and worthy reception of the Lord's Supper, London, 1673, which reached a thirtieth edition in 1753. In 1843 it was republished at Oxford with a preface by Albany James Christie. In the later editions the text underwent alterations; the Meditation for every Day in the Week appended to the third (1677) and subsequent editions seems to have been written by another divine. The Prayers before, at, and after the Holy Communion were reprinted in Theophilus Dorrington's Reform'd Devotions, 1700, 1704, 1727.

Lake's Diary in 1677–8 was edited in 1846 by George Percy Elliott, for vol. i. of the Camden Society's Miscellany. Sixteen of his Sermons preached upon Several Occasions (including a Concio ad Clerum Londinensem, 1685) were published by his son-in-law, William Taswell, London, 1705.

== Family ==
By his wife Margaret (1638–1712) Lake had a daughter, Frances, married in 1695 to William Taswell, D.D., also Mary and Anne.

== Notes ==
Attribution

This article incorporates text from a publication now in the public domain: Lee, Sidney, ed. (1892). "Lake, Edward (1641-1704)". Dictionary of National Biography. Vol. 31. London: Smith, Elder & Co.
