= Albany James Christie =

British theologian and academic (1817–1891)

Albany James Christie (18 December 1817 – 2 May 1891) was an English academic and Jesuit priest.

== Life ==
His father was Albany Henry Christie of Chelsea, London, and he was related to the auction house family founded by James Christie. In 1835 he was elected an Associate of King's College, London from the Department of General Literature and Science. He matriculated at Oriel College, Oxford on 2 July 1835, at age 17. He graduated B.A. there in 1839, with a first class in literae humaniores, and was a Fellow of Oriel from 1840 to 1845, graduating M.A. in 1842.

Initially Christie was in favour with the Oriel Noetics. Over the summer 1838 he was occupied with editorial work on the Library of the Fathers, an Oxford Movement project of E. B. Pusey. This was in a house in St Aldate's, Oxford, shared with James Mozley and Mark Pattison, as well as his brother. As a Fellow Christie worked on the church history of Claude Fleury, with John Henry Newman. Then in 1843 he turned to Ambrose and his work De virginitate, which with other factors aroused suspicion that he had Catholic sympathies. Edward Hawkins, Provost of Oriel, acted on the disquiet of others to put pressure on Christie, often absent from the college. By 1844 it was made clear to Christie that he would not have a recommendation from Hawkins to take Anglican orders. He failed to take deacon's orders from the Bishop of Oxford, for that reason, a decision by Hawkins connected with Tractarian opposition to Renn Hampden. He began to look at a medical career.

Christie in 1844 divided his time between St Bartholomew's Hospital, as a medical student, and Littlemore, Newman's small place of retreat just south of Oxford. In the following year, 1845, he walked in silence with the tearful Newman from Oxford to Littlemore, at the critical time, according to Wilfrid Ward's biography, when Newman was breaking from the Church of England. He himself became a Catholic convert, in London during October 1845, also entering formally the College (medical school) at Bart's. In 1847 he joined the Jesuits as a novice.

Christie was later known as a Catholic playwright and poet. In 1856 he became Superior of the seminary at Stonyhurst Saint Mary's Hall. In 1858 he was sent on mission work, and in 1862 he went to Farm Street Church in London. He received Sydney Fenn Smith into the Catholic Church in 1864, and George Tyrrell in 1879. He died in London, on 2 May 1891.

== Works ==
Christie wrote:

- The Ecclesiastical History of M. l'abbé Fleury, from the Second Ecumenical Council to the end of the fourth century (1842, 2 vols.) translator; further parts of the work were translated by George Buckle and William Kay.
- The Officium Eucharisticum of 1673 by Edward Lake (1843), preface
- On Holy Virginity; with a brief account of the life of St. Ambrose (1843)
- The Day Hours of the Church, with the Gregorian Tones (1844)
- On the philosophy of Christianity, in Essays on Religion and Literature (1867), edited by Henry Edward Manning
- The Martyrdom of St. Cecily: a drama (4th edition 1870)
- Union with Rome: Five afternoon lectures (1869)
- The first Christmas, a play (1875)
- The End of Man: In Four Books (1886), devotional poem of 8000 lines, based on the Spiritual Exercises of St. Ignatius
- Verses for the Stations of the Cross. London: Catholic Truth Society, [1890].
- Two Lectures on the Papacy (Preston). They comprised (1) The Papacy or Catholicity the counterpoise to tyranny and (2) On Church and State, with special reference to the Austrian Concordat

He wrote in the Dictionary of Greek and Roman Biography and Mythology as A. J. C.; and edited the monthly Catholic Progress.
