= Church of St Thomas à Becket, South Cadbury =

Church in Somerset, England

Coordinates: 51°01′39″N 2°31′37″W

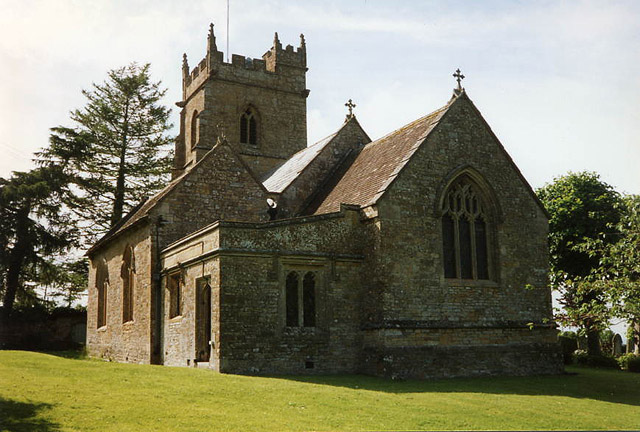
The Church of St Thomas à Becket in South Cadbury

The Church of St Thomas à Becket is the Anglican parish church for the ancient village of South Cadbury in Somerset and is dedicated to Thomas Becket. Today it is one of the 'Camelot Churches' of South Somerset in the Diocese of Bath and Wells and has been a Grade II* listed building since 1961. The church was much restored in the 1850s and 1870s.

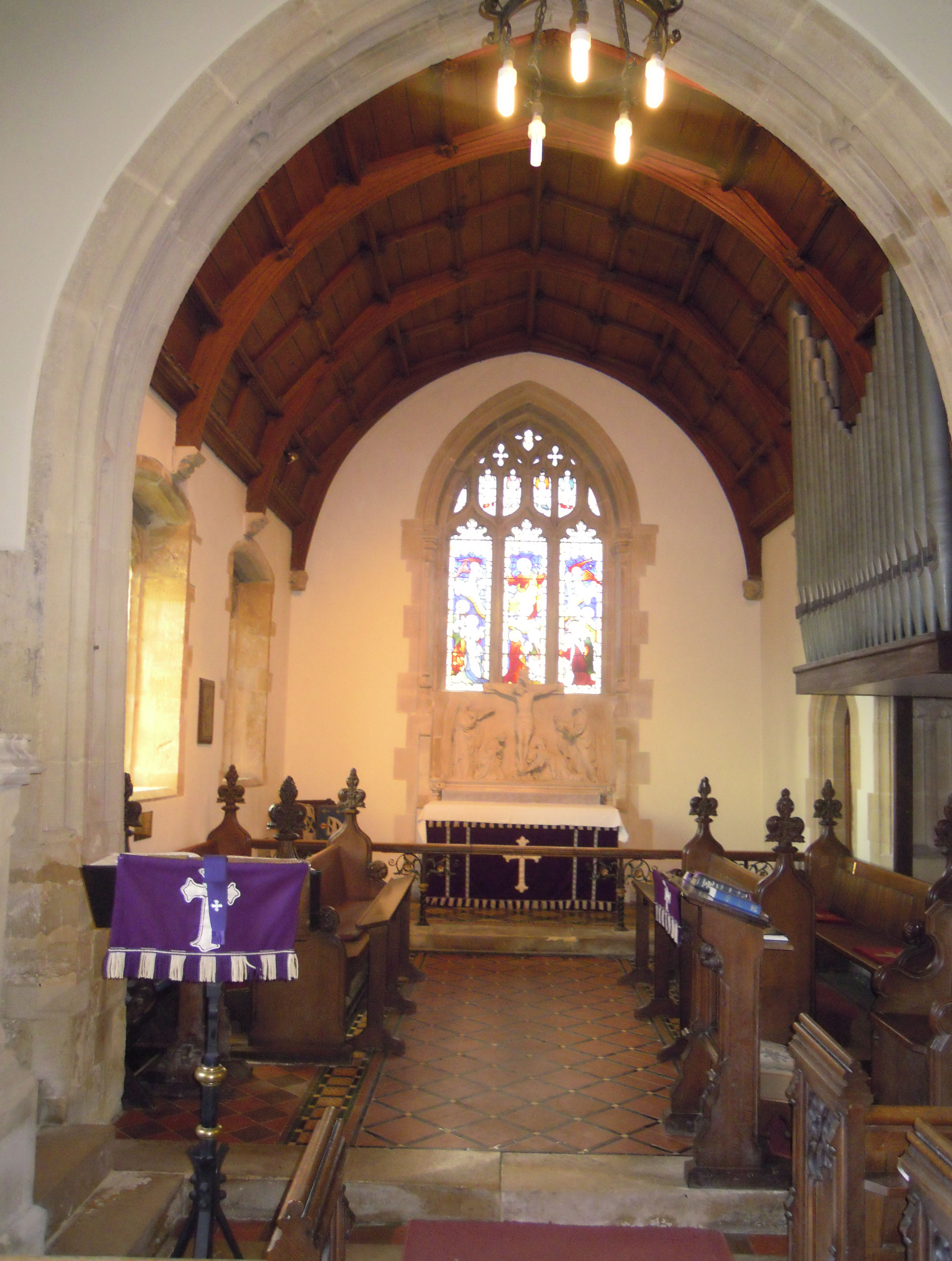
View towards the chancel

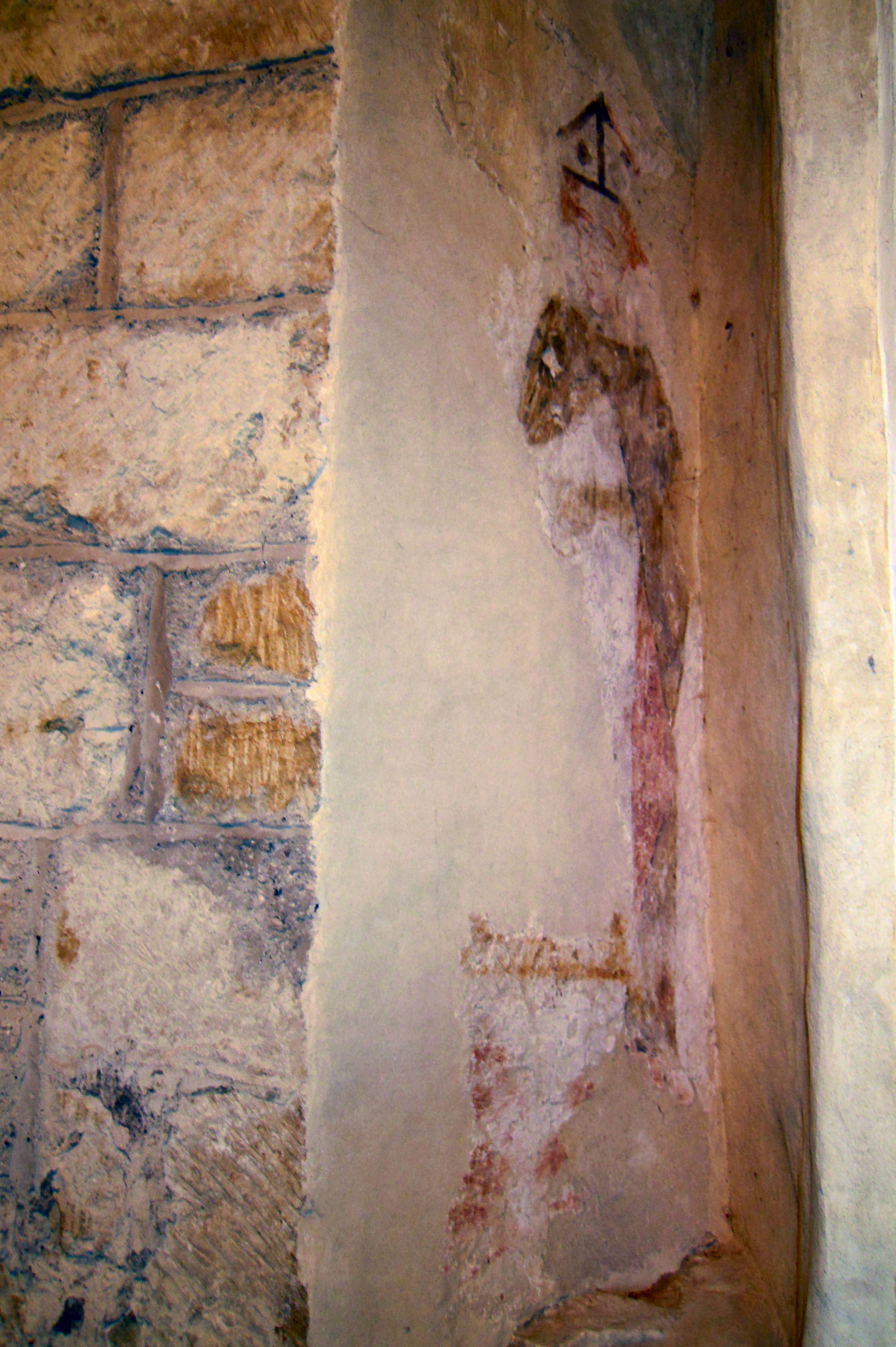
Wall painting, supposedly of St Thomas Becket

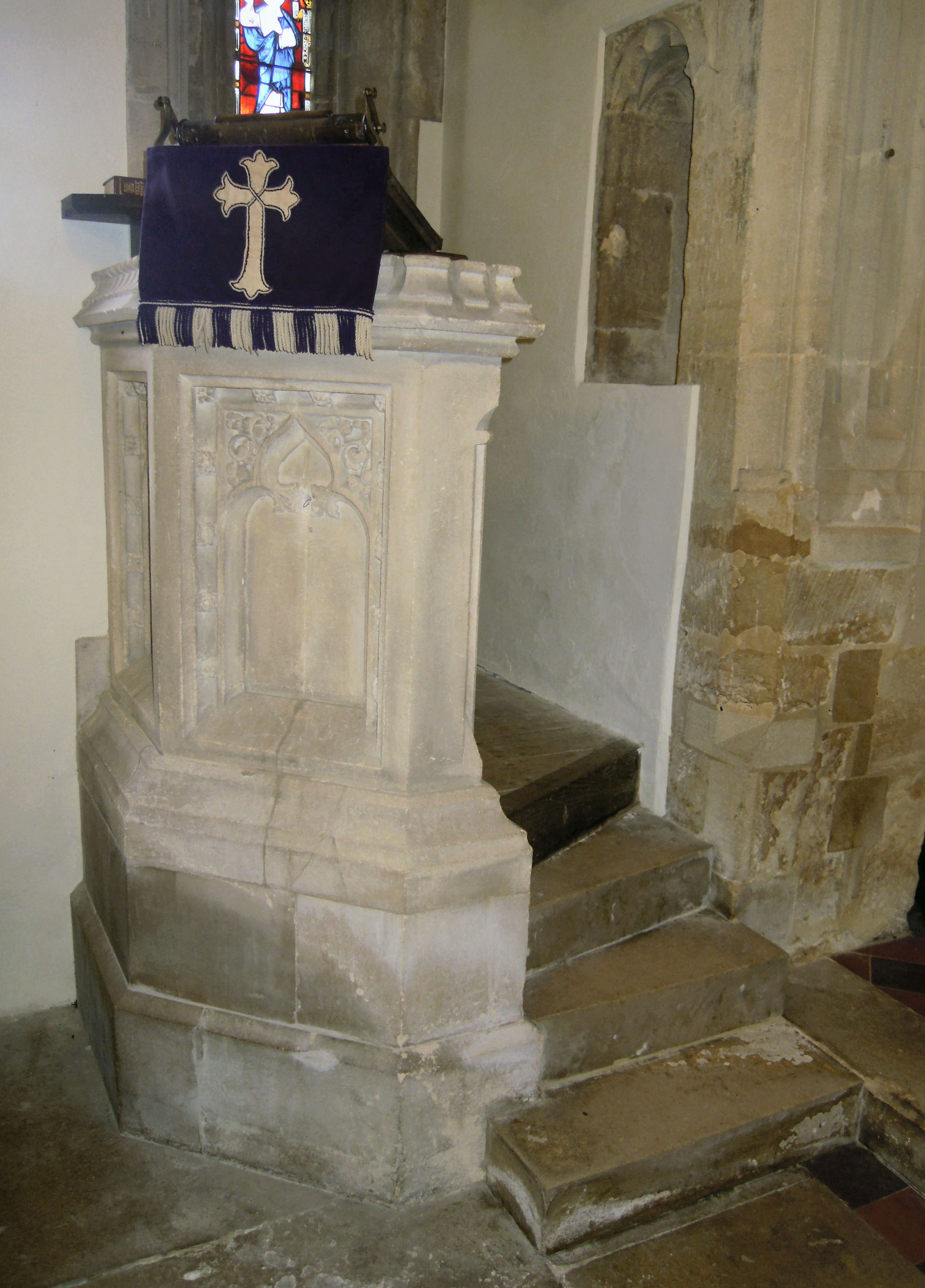
The pulpit dates to 1874

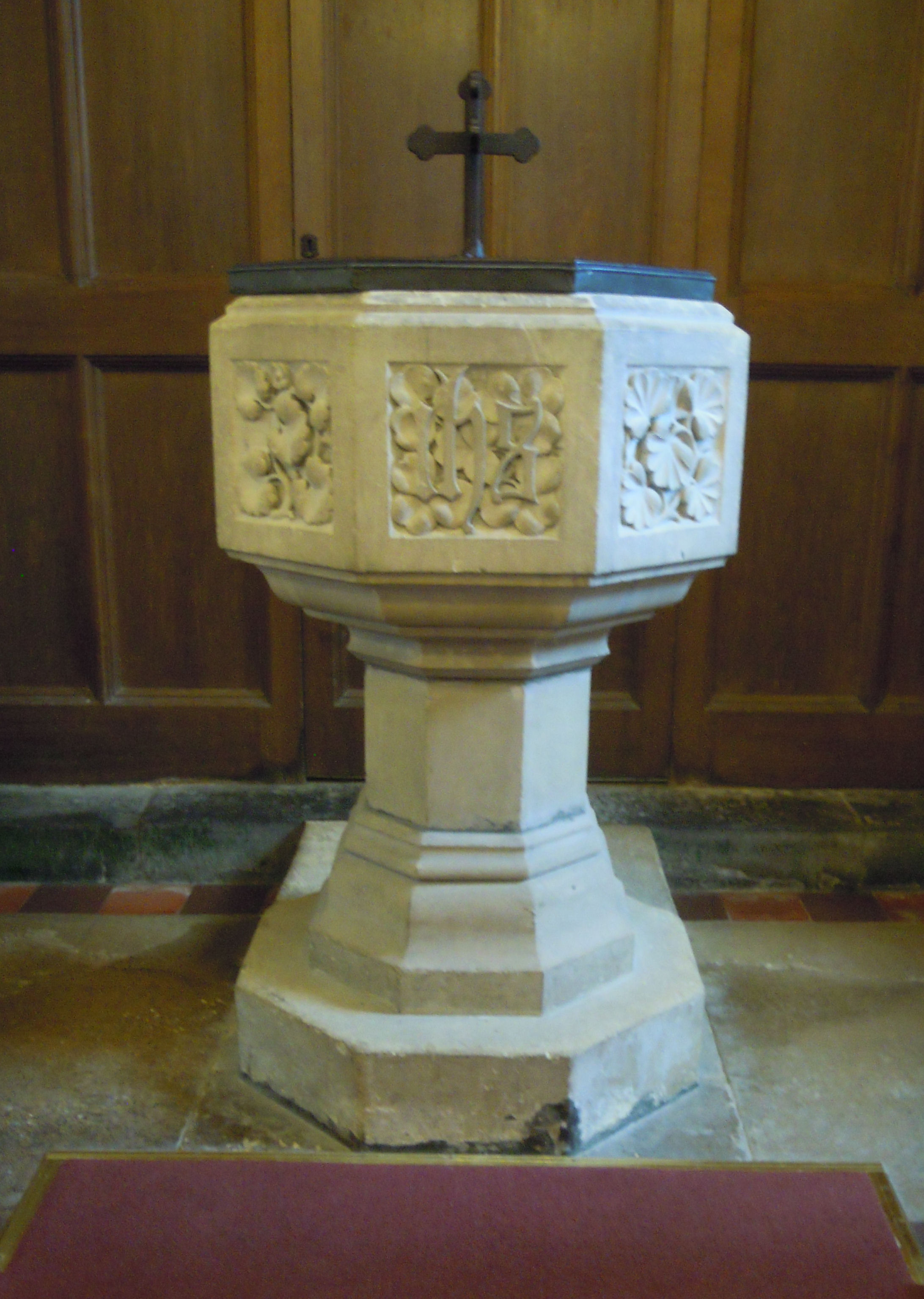
The baptismal font dates to about 1871

The Domesday Book of 1086 states that a priest (clericus) here had half of geldable land, which indicates an important church was on the site then. The dedication is to Thomas Becket who was martyred at Canterbury Cathedral in 1170. The first recorded Rector at South Cadbury is Peter de Burg in 1265, when the Cult of St Thomas would have been at its height and which makes it likely that the early wall painting (restored in 1984) of a bishop in cope and mitre seen on the splay of a window in the south aisle may represent St Thomas himself.

Built of cary and lias stone, mostly ashlar, with some Doulting stone dressings, the church largely dates from the 13th and 15th centuries, but was widely restored in 1874. Many of the fittings date from this time. However, the tower with its turret, pinnacles and gargoyles was built in the 14th-century and has a peal of six bells, while the church also boasts a 15th-century roof with angel brackets and carved bosses, and an early wall painting of St Thomas. The church is a Grade II* listed building.

The porch has been much restored but the inner and outer doorways, windows and the chancel arch belong to the later Perpendicular Period. The arcade is part of the original Early English building and dates from about 1280. The pillars are quatrefoil and have moulded capitals and decorative rings; the tower arch dates from the same period. In 1780 the gallery was moved from the bottom of the body of the church, where it hid the belfry arch. The Mary and Martha Window is a memorial to the Rev. James Arthur Bennett who was Rector from 1866 to 1890. It was due to his scholarly supervision that the restoration of 1874 was so successful. The chancel itself was entirely rebuilt in 1874 with the exception of the two windows to the North, which were preserved so far as the stonework allowed. Early in the 19th century the East window was cut down to form a window for the vestry. The present East Window dates to the restoration of 1874 and the glass depicting the Ascension is by Clayton and Bell, as is all the glass in the church from that period. The finely carved Crucifixion Scene which stands above the altar was erected in 1870 and is by Thomas Earp.

The pulpit stands on an old entrance to the rood loft. It is made of Bath stone and was carved for the restoration of 1874. A single panel from the earlier pulpit survived at the time and was used as a model for the pew-ends in the nave. All the wood in the church dates to this period with the exception of the tower door and screen. The niche behind the pulpit is in its original position, as is the squint or hagioscope in the south chancel arch, which was made to allow worshippers a view of the altar during Mass. The baptismal font was placed in the church in 1871; no trace of an earlier font survives except for a pewter bowl which was used for baptisms for many years until it was stolen in 1991.

The south aisle was rebuilt during the restoration of 1853 but holds a 14th-century piscina. The nave roof is 15th-century and has been repainted so that the carved bosses and angel brackets stand out. The rib and panel barrel vault roof in the chancel dates to 1874 and replaces one of 1790 which proved not to be effective.

The 18th century poet and satirist Charles Churchill was at one time curate at South Cadbury.
