= William Taswell =

William Taswell (1 May 1652 – June 1731) was a parish priest who as a Westminster schoolboy witnessed the Great Fire of London in 1666. He wrote an autobiography giving an account of the fire and other events he witnessed such as the Great Plague of London, which was posthumously published in 1852. He also published two controversial pamphlets criticising Quakerism.

== Biography ==
The son of a merchant, Taswell was born at Cowes. He went up to Christ Church, Oxford on 8 July 1670, gaining his B.A. in 1674, M.A. in 1677, B.D. in 1685 and D.D. in 1698. While there he had a beneficial relationship with the Dean, John Fell, who offered him financial support knowing that he received little financial support from his father. In exchange he assisted Fell in manuscript work, for example translating Thomas Lydiat's Chronological Canons into Latin. In 1681, he was appointed college lecturer in Greek.

He served as rector of Swanton Novers, and of Wood Norton, Norfolk from 1692 to 1698 and of St. Mary Bermondsey from 1724 to 1727. In 1695, he married Frances, daughter of Edward Lake. He died on 17 or 22 June 1731 and was buried at Newington.
