= Narayan Govind Kalelkar =

Indian linguist (1909–1989)

Narayan Govind Kalelkar (11 December 1909 - 1989) was a linguist from Maharashtra, India.

He was born in the village of Bambuli in Ratnagiri District. He received his early college education in Baroda and Mumbai with specialization in French language, and a D.Lit. Degree from a university in Paris.

He taught French and Literature at Baroda Vidyapeeth, and Indo-Aryan/Indo-European languages at Deccan College in Pune.

Kalelkar authored several books on linguistics in Marathi, they being the first of their kind in Marathi. His Dhwanivichar (ध्वनिविचार) (1955) and Bhasha Ani Samskruti (भाषा आणि संस्कृति) (1960) received Maharashtra state's literary prizes; and his Bhasha: Itihas Ani Bhoogol (भाषा: इतिहास आणि भूगोल) (1964) received a Sahitya Akademi award in 1967.

== Contribution to Konkani language ==
Kalekar's study of Konkani was instrumental in Sahitya Akademi's decision in 1975 to recognize Konkani as an independent Indian language (rather than being a dialect of Marathi).
