= K. Paddayya =

Indian archaeologist and Professor Emeritus

- Born: 20 May 1943 (age 83); Pamulapadu, Andhra Pradesh, India
- Occupation: Archaeologist
- Awards: Padma Shri
- Website: Official web site

Katragadda Paddayya is an Indian archaeologist, Professor Emeritus and a former director of Deccan College, known to have introduced two major perspectives in archaeological theory and methodology. He was honored by the Government of India, in 2012, with the fourth highest Indian civilian award of Padma Shri.

== Biography ==
Paddayya hails from Pune and secured a doctoral degree in archaeology from Pune University in 1968. He started his career as a lecturer in European Prehistory by joining the department of archaeology of Deccan College. Over the years, he rose in ranks as the Reader, Professor and later, as the Director of the institution. On retirement, Deccan College conferred the status of Professor Emeritus on Paddayya.

Paddayya is known to have done extensive research on the Paleolithic and Neolithic cultures of the Shorapur Doab in the Deccan. He is credited with two theoretical and methodological perspectives in archaeological studies which are considered by many as major innovations. He has held two Fulbright Scholarships with the University of California and University of New Mexico and this has assisted in enhanced cooperation between American and Indian archaeologists. He is also a recipient of Senior lecture grants from University of Michigan, Ann Arbor and the Smithsonian Institution.

Paddayya, who had a close association with the renowned scholar, Kenneth Adrian Raine Kennedy, has authored 7 books and several articles in peer reviewed journals. Some of his notable works are:

- Recent Studies in Indian Archaeology
- Investigations into the Neolithic Culture of the Shorapur Doab, South India
- New Archaeology and Aftermath: A View from Outside the Anglo-American World
- Multiple Approaches to the Study of India's Early Past: Essays in Theoretical Archaeology

Paddayya has served the editorial boards of journals such as Indian Historical Review and the Journal of Social Archaeology and has given many lectures on archaeology. An honorary fellow of the Society of Antiquaries of London, Paddayya was awarded the civilian honour of Padma Shri by the Government of India in 2012.
