= Shridhar Venkatesh Ketkar =

Late Indian sociologist, historian and novelist

Shri Shridhar Venkatesh Ketkar
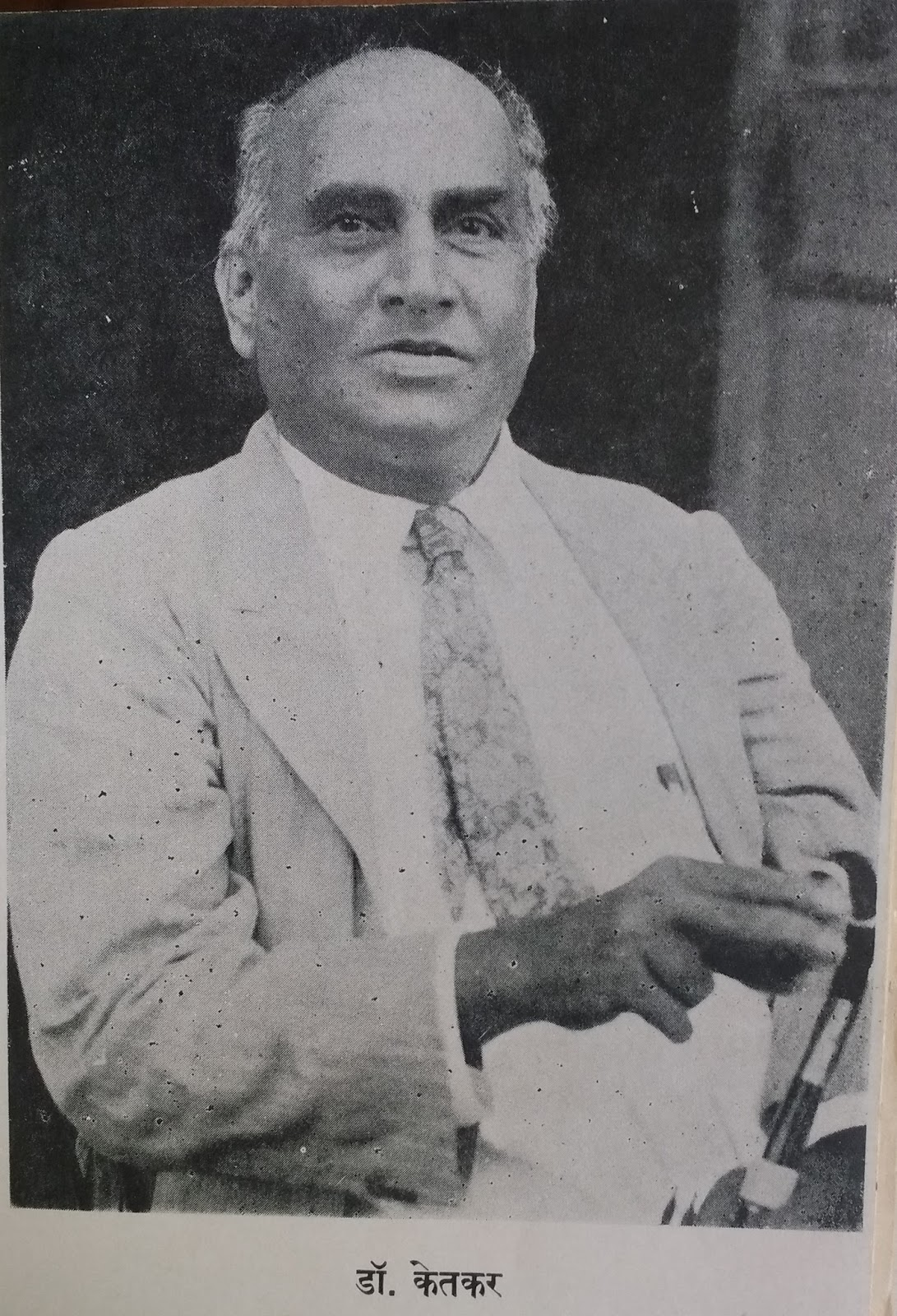
- Born: 2 February 1884; Raipur, Central Provinces, British India
- Died: 10 April 1937 (aged 53)
- Occupations: Historian, Sociologist
- Spouse: Sheelavati (née Edith Kohn)

Shridhar Venkatesh Ketkar (2 February 1884 – 10 April 1937) was a Marathi sociologist, historian and novelist from Maharashtra, India. He is principally known as the chief editor of Maharashtriya Jnanakosha, the first-ever encyclopedia in the Marathi language.

== Early life and background ==
Ketkar was born into a Marathi Hindu family in Raipur, Madhya Pradesh, and was educated in Wilson College, Bombay. He left for the United States in 1906 and obtained his PHD from Cornell University in 1911. After a yearlong sojourn in London (circa 1912), where he met his future wife Edith Kohn, he returned to India.

== Career ==
His first appointment in India was as a professor of economics, science of administration and universal jurisprudence at Calcutta University.

In 1920, Ketkar married Edith Kohn (1886–1979), who joined him in Pune. Edith's name was changed to Sheelavati Ketkar after the wedding. Mrs Ketkar has written a memoir about Ketkar's peculiarities, their two adopted children and family life. Mrs Ketkar (who was a native German speaker) had translated Moriz Winternitz's 'A History of Indian Literature' from English into German for her husband's private use; however, this was later published due to the encouragement of Prof Winternitz himself (who was a family friend).

Ketkar served as the president of two Marathi literary conventions, namely the Sharadopasak Sammelan (शारदोपासक सम्मेलन) in 1926, and the Maharashtra Sahitya Sammelan (महाराष्ट्र साहित्य सम्मेलन) in 1931.

Ketkar, who was a diabetic, died in Pune of a gangrenous wound. A biography has been written by D. N. Gokhale.

== Sociological and historical works ==
His doctoral thesis was later published as The History of Caste in India (volume 1), which determines the date of Manusmriti and comments on the nature of caste-relations in that period. He later wrote a sequel to this work, titled An Essay on Hinduism, which discusses, inter alia, the genesis of the caste system in India.

In 1914, he published two more treatises, namely An Essay on Indian Economics, and Hindu Law and the Methods and Principles of the Historical Study Thereof.

Ketkar's political opinions may be gleaned from his Nishastranche Rajkaran (नि:शस्त्रांचे राजकारण, Politics of the Unarmed, 1926) and Victorious India (1937). After nearly a decade of study, he wrote a historical work called Pracheen Maharashtra: Shaatvahan Parva (प्राचीन महाराष्ट्र: शातवाहन पर्व, Ancient Maharashtra: The Shaatvahan Period, 1935).

== The encyclopedia ==
Ketkar's work on the encyclopedia occupied him approximately from 1916 until 1928. He was not only the originator and the editor, but also the accountant and the general manager of the entire project.

An account of his experiences about this project is contained in his book माझे बारा वर्षांचे काम, उर्फ ज्ञानकोश मंडळाचा इतिहास (माझे बारा वर्षांचे काम, उर्फ ज्ञानकोश मंडळाचा इतिहास, Twelve Years of My Work, or the History of the Encyclopaedia Committee).

== Novels ==
Ketkar also wrote the following novels in Marathi.

- Gondavanatila priyamvada ani gharkutte gharanyacha itihas (गोंदवनातील प्रियंवदा अाणि घरकुट्टे घराण्याचा इतिहास, 1926)
- Ashavadi, athava eka pravahapatiteche charitra (अाशावादी, अथवा एका प्रवाहपतितेचे चरित्र, 1927)
- Gaavasasu (गावसासू, 1930)
- Brahmanakanya (ब्राह्मणकन्या, 1930)
- Bhatakya (भटक्या, 1937)
- Vichakshana (विचक्षण, 1937)

The novels may be called "novels of ideas" in a broad sense of the term. They evince little interest in conventional character development; on the other hand, they contain much information about various tribes and societies, coupled with several strikingly blunt ideas about sociological reform.

Critical studies of the novels have been published by D N Gokhale and Durga Bhagwat.
