= Charles Churchill (satirist) =

English poet and satirist (1732–1764)

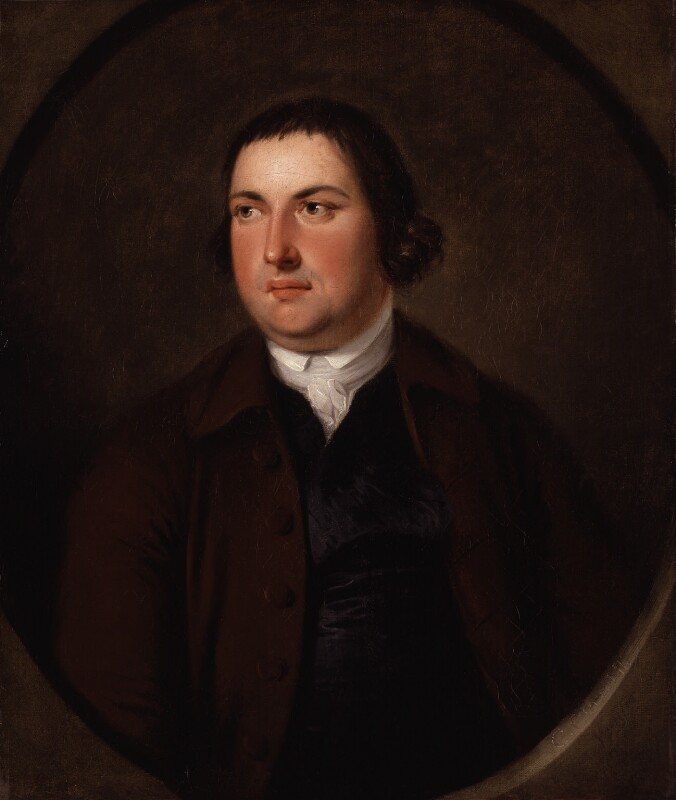
- Born: February 1732; Westminster, England
- Died: 4 November 1764 (aged 32); Boulogne, France
- Education: Westminster School
- Occupations: Anglican clergyman, poet, satirist
- Spouse: Miss Scott
- Children: Two sons

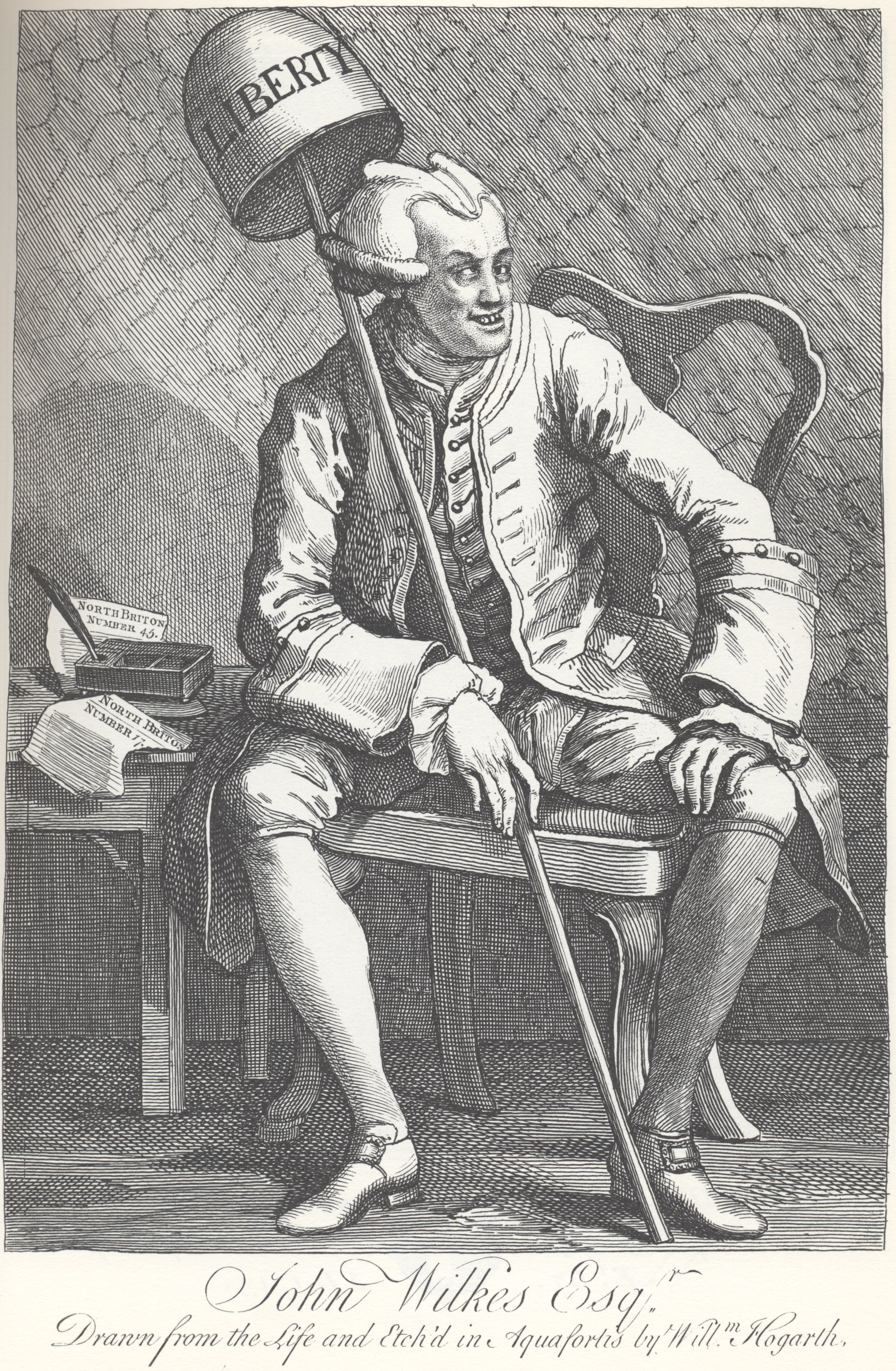
A satirical engraving of Wilkes by William Hogarth, who shows him with a demonic-looking wig, crossed eyes, and two editions of his The North Briton: Numbers 17 (in which he attacked, amongst others, Hogarth) and the famous 45

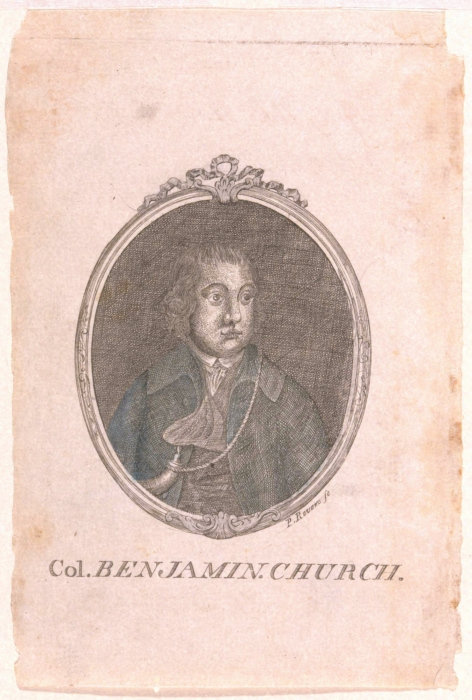
Charles Churchill's portrait was engraved and used by Paul Revere as a fake portrait of Colonel Benjamin Church to illustrate a 1772 edition of Benjamin Church's The Entertaining History of King Philip's War.

Charles Churchill (February 1732 – 4 November 1764) was an English poet and satirist.

== Early life ==
Churchill was born in Vine Street, Westminster. His father, Rev. Charles Churchill, was rector of Rainham, Essex, held the curacy and lectureship of St Johns, Westminster, from 1733, and Charles was educated at Westminster School, where he became a good classical scholar, and formed a close and lasting friendship with Robert Lloyd. He was admitted to St John's College, Cambridge on 8 July 1748. Churchill contracted a marriage with a Miss Scot within the rules of the Fleet in his eighteenth year, and never lived at Cambridge; the young couple lived in his father's house, and Churchill was afterwards sent to the north of England to prepare for holy orders.

He became curate of the Church of St Thomas à Becket in South Cadbury, Somerset, and, on receiving priest's orders (1756), began to act as his father's curate at Rainham. Two years later the elder Churchill died, and the son was elected to succeed him in his curacy and lectureship. His emoluments amounted to less than £100 a year, and he increased his income by teaching in a girls' school. His marriage proved unhappy, and he began to spend much of his time in dissipation in the society of Robert Lloyd. He was separated from his wife in 1761, and would have been imprisoned for debt but for the timely help of Lloyd's father, Pierson Lloyd, who had been an usher and was now second master at Westminster School.

== Satirist ==
Churchill had already done some work for the booksellers, and his friend Lloyd had had some success with a didactic poem, The Actor. Churchill's knowledge of the theatre was now made use of in the Rosciad, which appeared in March 1761. This reckless and amusing satire described with the most disconcerting accuracy the faults of the various actors and actresses on the London stage; in a competition judged by Shakespeare and Jonson, Garrick is named the greatest English actor. Its immediate popularity was no doubt largely due to its personal character, but its vigour and raciness make it worth reading even now when the objects of Churchill's wit are forgotten.

The first impression was published anonymously, and in the Critical Review, conducted by Tobias Smollett, it was confidently asserted that the poem was the joint production of George Colman the Elder, Bonnell Thornton and Robert Lloyd. Churchill immediately published an Apology addressed to the Critical Reviewers, which, after developing the subject that it is only authors who prey on their own kind, repeats the fierce attack on the stage. Incidentally it contains an enthusiastic tribute to John Dryden, of whom Churchill was a devotee. In the Rosciad he had praised Mrs Pritchard, Mrs Cibber and Mrs Clive, but no leading London actor, with the exception of David Garrick, had escaped censure, and in the Apology Garrick was clearly threatened. He deprecated criticism by showing every possible civility to Churchill, who became a terror to the actors. Thomas Davies wrote to Garrick attributing his blundering in the part of Cymbeline "to my accidentally seeing Mr Churchill in the pit, it rendering me confused and unmindful of my business."

Churchill's satire made him many enemies, and brought reprisals. In Night, an Epistle to Robert Lloyd (1761), he answered the attacks made on him, offering by way of defense the argument that any faults were better than hypocrisy. His scandalous conduct brought down the censure of the dean of Westminster, and in 1763 the protests of his parishioners led him to resign his offices, and he was free to wear his blue coat with metal buttons and much gold lace without remonstrance from the dean. The Rosciad had been refused by several publishers, and was finally published at Churchill's own expense. He received a considerable sum from the sale, and paid his old creditors in full, besides making an allowance to his wife.

== Friendship with Wilkes ==
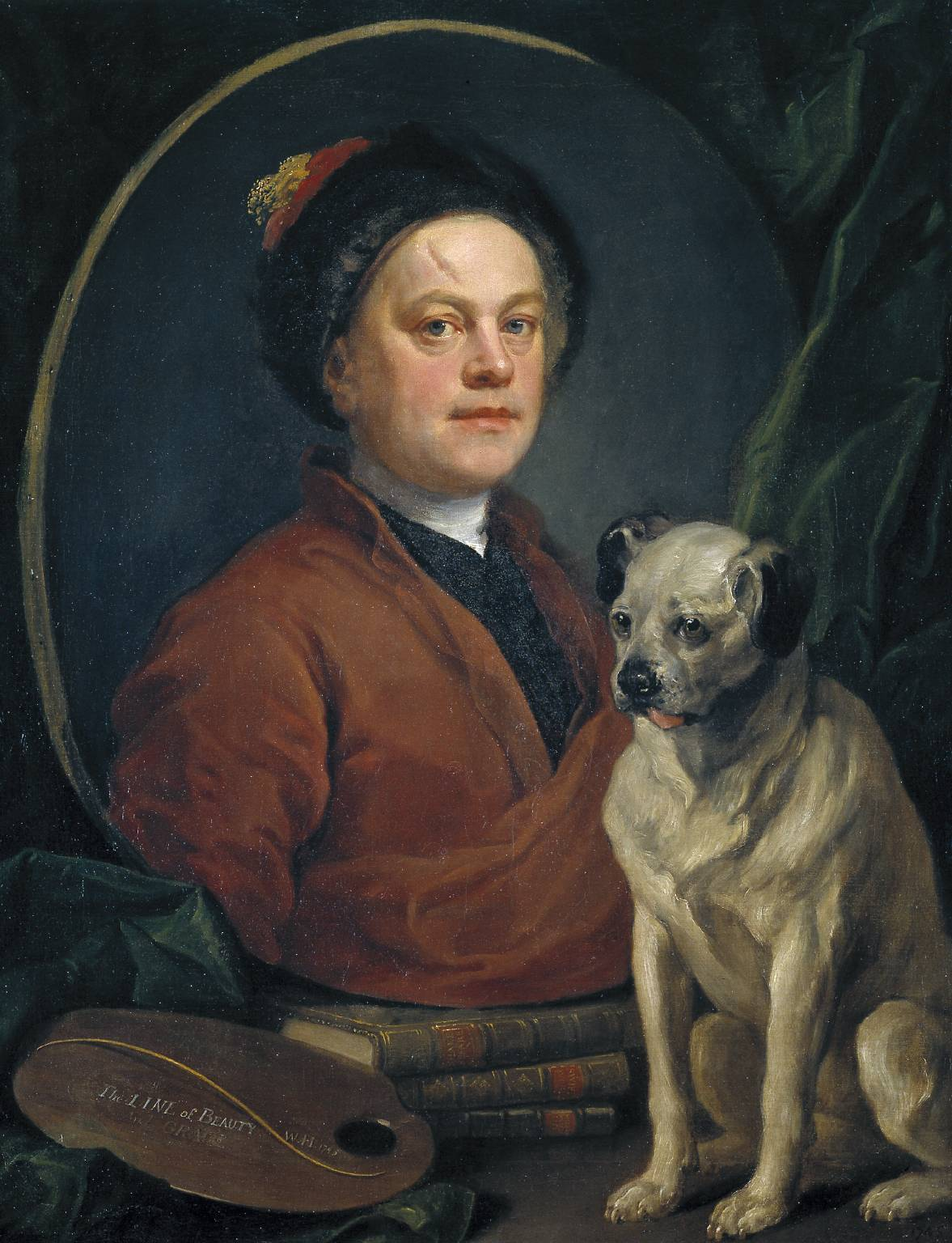
The Painter and his Pug by Hogarth

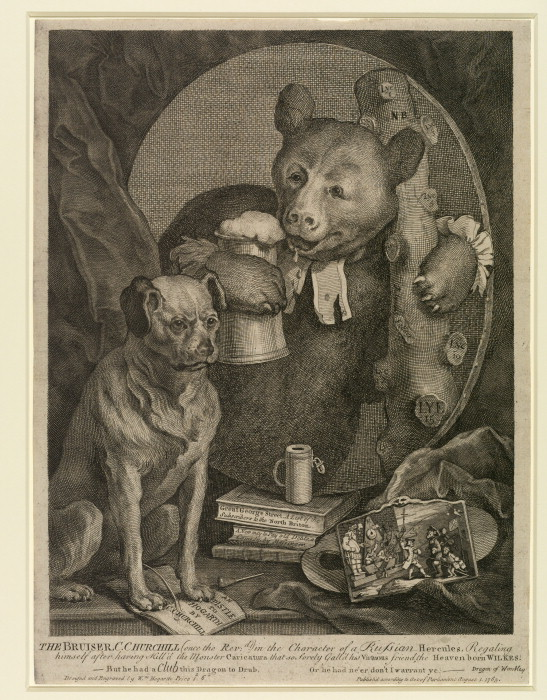
1763 "portrait" of Churchill by William Hogarth

In 1761 or 1762 he became a close ally and friend with the champion of liberty of the press John Wilkes, whom he regularly assisted with The North Briton weekly newspaper. His collaboration with Wilkes thereafter earned him an honourable place in the history of parliamentary democracy and civil liberties.

His next poem, The Prophecy of Famine: A Scots Pastoral (1763), was founded on a paper written originally for The North Briton. This violent satire on Scottish influence fell in with the current hatred of Lord Bute, and the Scottish place-hunters were as much alarmed as the actors had been. When Wilkes was arrested he gave Churchill a timely hint to retire to the country for a time, the publisher, Kearsley, having stated that he received part of the profits from the paper. His Epistle to William Hogarth (1763) was in answer to the caricature of Wilkes made during the trial, in it Hogarth's vanity and envy were attacked in an invective which Garrick quoted as shocking and barbarous. Hogarth retaliated with an engraving based on his The Painter and his Pug, which caricatures Churchill as a bear in torn clerical bands hugging a pot of porter and a club made of lies and NB, while Hogarth's pug Trump urinates on Churchill's Epistle.

The Duellist (1763) is a virulent satire on the most active opponents of Wilkes in the House of Lords, especially on Bishop Warburton. He attacked Dr Johnson among others in The Ghost as "Pomposo, insolent and loud, Vain idol of a scribbling crowd". Other poems are The Conference (1763); The Author (1763), highly praised by Churchill's contemporaries; Gotham (1764), a poem on the duties of a king, didactic rather than satiric in tone; The Candidate (1764), a satire on John Montagu, fourth earl of Sandwich, one of Wilkes's bitterest enemies, whom he had already denounced for his treachery in The Duellist (Bk. iii.) as too infamous to have a friend; The Farewell (1764); The Times (1764); Independence, and an unfinished Journey.

== Death and legacy ==
In October 1764 he went to Boulogne to join Wilkes. There he was attacked by a fever of which he died on 4 November. He left his property to his two sons, and made Wilkes his literary executor with full powers. Wilkes did little. He wrote an epitaph for his friend and about half a dozen notes on his poems, and Andrew Kippis acknowledges some slight assistance from him in preparing his life of Churchill for the Biographia (1780). There is more than one instance of Churchill's generosity to his friends. In 1763 he found his friend Robert Lloyd in prison for debt. He paid a guinea a week for his better maintenance in the Fleet, and raised a subscription to set him free. Lloyd fell ill on receipt of the news of Churchill's death, and died shortly afterwards. Churchill's sister Patty, who was engaged to Lloyd, did not long survive them. William Cowper was his schoolfellow, and left many kindly references to him.

A partial collection of Churchill's poems appeared in 1763. As he left England forever in April 1816, Lord Byron visited Churchill's grave. He dramatized the visit in his poem "Churchill's Grave, A Fact Literally Remembered".

== Sources ==
- The Poetical Works of Charles Churchill. Edited with an introduction and notes by Douglas Grant. Oxford, Clarendon Press, 1957.
