= F. W. Bain =

British writer (1863–1940)

- Born: 29 April 1863
- Died: 24 February 1940 (aged 76)

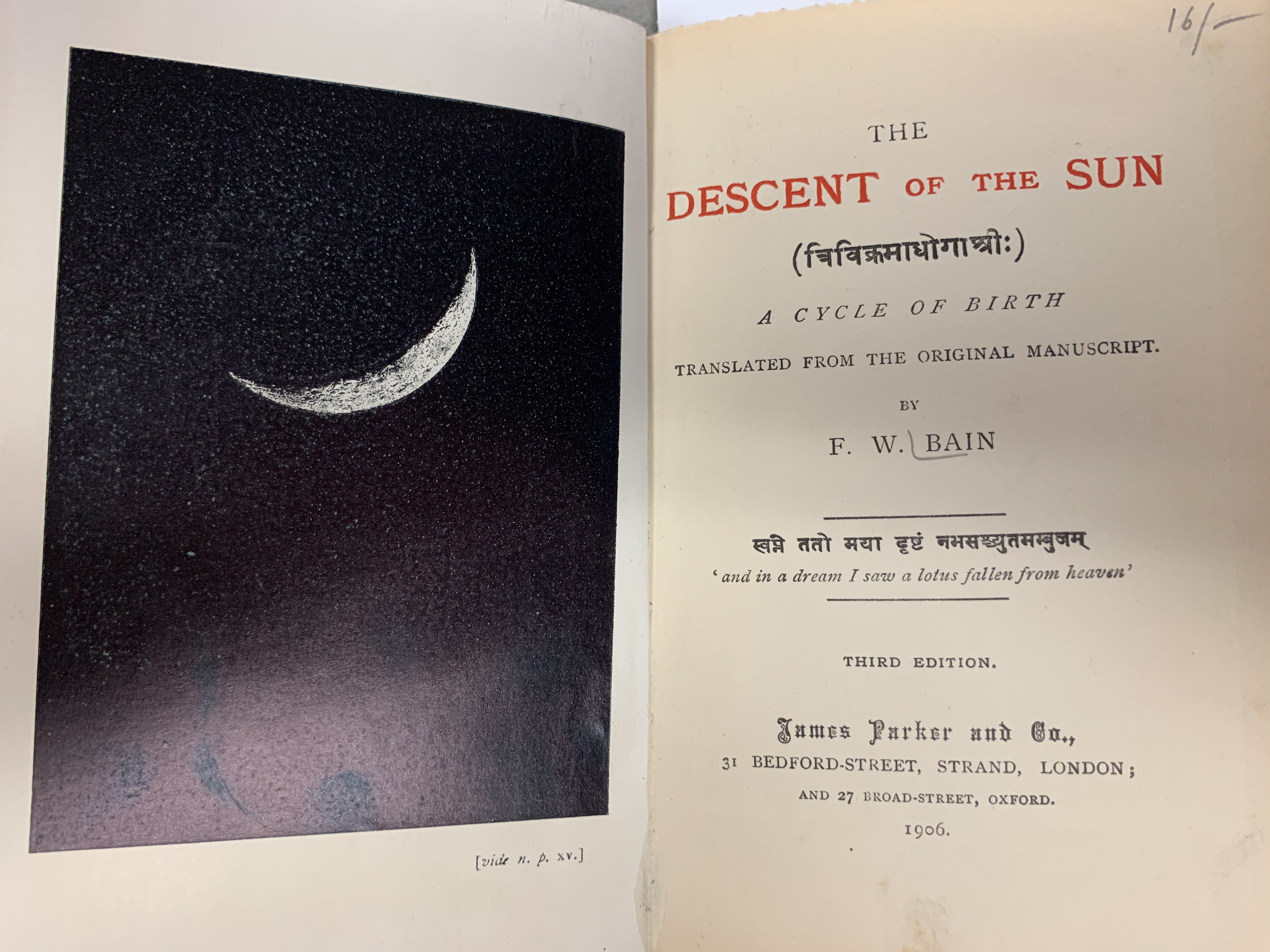

Francis William Bain (29 April 1863 – 24 February 1940) was a British writer of fantasy stories that he claimed were translated from Sanskrit.

== Biography ==
He was born on 29 April 1863, the son of Joseph Bain. He was educated at Westminster School, before going up to Christ Church, Oxford where he distinguished himself as a student of Classics. In 1889, he was elected a fellow of All Souls College.

In his youth he was a keen amateur footballer, representing the University against Cambridge between 1883 and 1886; he was also a member of the leading amateur teams of the time, Wanderers and Corinthians.

In 1892, he entered the Indian Educational Service, going on to become a professor of History in the Deccan College of Poonah (Pune), in British India, until his retirement in 1919. He died on 24 February 1940.

== Writings ==
The first of these was A Digit of the Moon (1898), which Bain claimed was his translation of the eighth part of sixteen of a Sanskrit manuscript given to him by a brahmin. In the story, the king Súryakánta falls in love with the wise and beautiful princess Anangarágá, who will marry only the suitor who asks her a question she cannot answer. The king, with his clever friend Rasakósha, sets off to win the hand of the princess.

During Bain's life, the argument raged about whether the story was truly a translation or whether Bain had written it himself. While some early reviewers took his statements at face value, many did not. A contemporary review said, in part:

Though palpably a pretense, they are graceful fancies, and might as well have appeared for what they really are instead of masquerading as "translations". No Hindu, unless of this generation and under foreign influence, ever conceived these stories. . . . Moreover, they are of a strict propriety, whereas original Hindu love stories would put Rabelais's ghost to the blush.

The book contains numerous footnotes referring to Sanskrit puns and wordplay that the author claimed to have been unable to render in English.

A Digit of the Moon was followed by a number of other stories in the same mode: Syrup of the Bees, Bubbles of the Foam, Essence of the Dusk, Ashes of a God, Mine of Faults, Heifer of the Dawn, and others. As more books appeared, it became clearer that Bain was writing these stories himself, not translating. A review of Bubbles of the Foam in 1912 said:

Yet, despite the beauty of the whole, there is much in the volume that seems non-Indian; in fact, distinctly Occidental. The phraseology lacks in great part the subtle Sanskrit flavor…

Significant portions of his book Descent of the Sun were used, often word-for-word and with credit, by Meatball Fulton for his Fourth Tower of Inverness radio series.

Before his fantasy series, he also wrote other works, including political works. One was "Antichrist: A Short Examination of the Spirit of the Age":

It is difficult for a critic to do justice to a book which he finds irritating from cover to cover. Mr. Bain starts from the position that the French Revolution was "not necessary." […]

== Works ==
=== Miscellaneous writings ===
- Dmitri, a tragi comedy.. London: Percivial and Co., 1890.
- Occam's razor: the application of a principle to political economy, to the conditions of progress, to socialism, to politics. Oxford: Parker & Co., 1890.
- Christina, queen of Sweden. [s.i.]: Allen and Co., 1890.
- Treachery : a Spanish romance. [With an appendix on Pedro, king of Castile, called the Cruel]. London : [s.n.], 1891
- Antichrist: a short examination of the spirit of the age. Oxford; London : [s.n.], 1891.
- On the principle of wealth-creation : its nature, origin, evolution, and corollaries : being a critical reconstruction of scientific political economy. London : J. Parker and Co., 1892.
- The corner in gold : its history and theory: being a reply to Mr. Robert Giffen's 'Case against bimetallism.' . Oxford : James Parker & Co., 1893.
- The unseen foundation of the 'unseen foundations of society' : An accusation of plagiarism against the Duke of Argyll. London: J. Parker & Co, 1893.
- The English monarchy and its revolutions: study in analytical politics. London: Parker, 1894.
- Body and soul : or, The method of economy. London: J. Parker, 1894.
- A Specimen of criticism: [an answer to Professor Bastable's criticism in 'The Economic Journal' of the author's 'Body and Soul']. Oxford: printed for the author, 1895.
- The bullion report : and the foundation of the gold standard. Oxford: Printed for the author by J. Parker and Co., 1896.
- On the realisation of the possible, and the spirit of Aristotle. London: James Parker, 1899.
- De vi physica et imbecillitate Darwiniana disputavit Franciscus Gulielmus Bain : [with appendix on Darwin's theory of coral islands]. Oxford; London : J. Parker and Co., 1903.
- Dmitri; a grand story of Russia. New York, A.L. Fowle, 1906.
- Decapitated Russia. London : Boswell Print. & Pub. Co, [1926].

=== Fantasy “Sanskrit translations” ===
- A Digit of the Moon: (bālātaparaktāśaśinī) : a Hindoo love story. London: J. Parker, 1899.
- The Descent of the Sun : (trivikramādhogāśrīḥ) : a cycle of birth. London : J. Parker, 1903.
- A Heifer of the Dawn: (usriyāsambhṛtāmṛtā). London : J. Parker, 1904.
- In the Great God's Hair : (surāsurādimānadā). London : J. Parker, 1904.
- A Draught of the Blue: (puṣkarekṣaṇāṅgadā). London; Parker & Son; Oxford : J. Parker & Co, 1905.
- An Essence of the Dusk : (ahipīditācandrikā). London : J. Parker, 1906.
- An Incarnation of the Snow : (bhavamānasālayājyotsnā). Oxford; London : J. Parker : Simpkin, Marshal, Hamilton, Kent, 1908.
- A Mine of Faults: (doṣākarasārātuṣṭi). Oxford; London : J. Parker : Simpkin, Marshall, 1909.
- The Ashes of a God : (smarabhasmasañjīvinītuṣṭi). London : Methuen & Co, 1911.
- Bubbles of the Foam : (phenopamamātrāprīti). London : Methuen & Co, 1912.
- A Syrup of the Bees. London : Methuen & Co, 1914.
- The Livery of Eve : (rāgodadhidughāpusạ̄). London : Methuen & Co, 1917.
- The Substance of a Dream : (svapnopamakānti). London : Methuen & Co, 1919.
- An Echo of the Spheres: rescued from oblivion. London : Methuen, 1919.
- (with calligraphy by Graily Hewitt) The banks of the Ganges : calligraphy. Binding by C. & C. McLeish. 1920.
- The Indian stories of F. W. Bain.. London : Philip Lee Warner ... [for] the Medici Society, 1913-1920. 13 volumes.
