= Blondey McCoy =

British artist and model

- Born: Thomas Eblen Hage; 23 May 1997 (age 29)
- Education: Westminster School
- Children: 4

Thomas Eblen (born Hage; 23 May 1997), better known as Blondey McCoy, is an English artist, skateboarder and model.

McCoy was born to a British mother and Lebanese father, although he was raised by his grandmother, the author and cook Salma Hage. He was educated at Rokeby Preparatory School in Kingston Upon Thames, and later Westminster School in central London.

McCoy works in several genres and mediums, including collage, installation art and murals. The series of collages titled Us and Chem explores issues relating to mental health, addressing the United Kingdom's treatment of depression and anxiety in young people and the over-reliance on prescribed antidepressants. The artworks feature a mirror background that constantly changes depending on their surroundings.

Blondey conceived the idea for his brand Thames as part of his GCSE Art project, and in 2014 began working alongside Palace Skateboards, whom he parted ways with in 2019. Since 2019, McCoy has been the creative director of this brand. McCoy has modelled for Supreme, Burberry, Valentino, Palace and Adidas. McCoy has a long relationship with photographer Alasdair McLellan that has culminated in a book of their model/photographer relationship titled 'Blondey 15-21' published June 2019. He is represented by the Kate Moss agency.
