= Danish Royal Library, MS NKS 1867 4° =

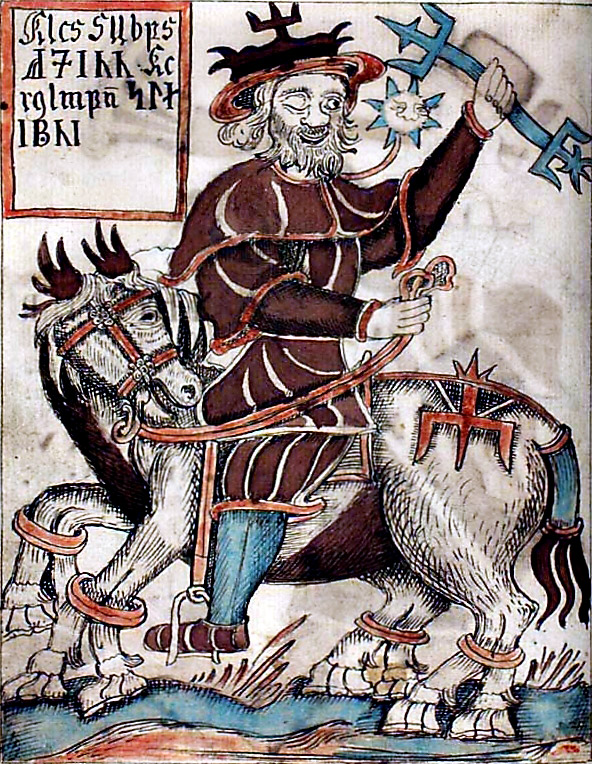
Odin riding Sleipnir, from NKS 1867 4to.

MS NKS 1867 4° is a 1760 paper manuscript now in the Danish Royal Library, Copenhagen (section Den nye kongelige samling). It contains skaldic poetry, assorted runological information, the Prose Edda and the Poetic Edda, plus Sólarljóð, and 16 illustrations based on the Eddas.
