= Bonnell Thornton =

English poet and essayist (1725–1768)

Bonnell Thornton (1725–1768) was an English poet, essayist, and critic. He was educated at Westminster School, and at Christ Church, Oxford, where he graduated B.A. in 1747.

In 1752 Thornton founded the Drury Lane Journal, a satirical periodical which, among other things, lampooned other journals such as Johnson's Rambler, The Gentleman's Magazine and The London Magazine. Twelve issues were published between January and April 1752. From 1754 to 1756 he published, with George Colman, a six-page weekly serial, The Connoisseur, which, although criticised by Dr. Johnson for lack of substance, ran to 140 issues. He was a frequent contributor to The Gentleman's Magazine.

Thornton was also a member of the Nonsense Club of Old Westminster men with George Colman, William Cowper, Charles Churchill and Robert Lloyd.

He married Sylvia Braithwaite, younger and posthumous daughter of Colonel John Braithwaite by his wife Silvia Cole, and sister of Major-General Sir John Braithwaite, 1st Baronet. She was noted for her outstanding piety. They had three children.
