= Robert Lloyd (poet) =

18th-century English poet and satirist

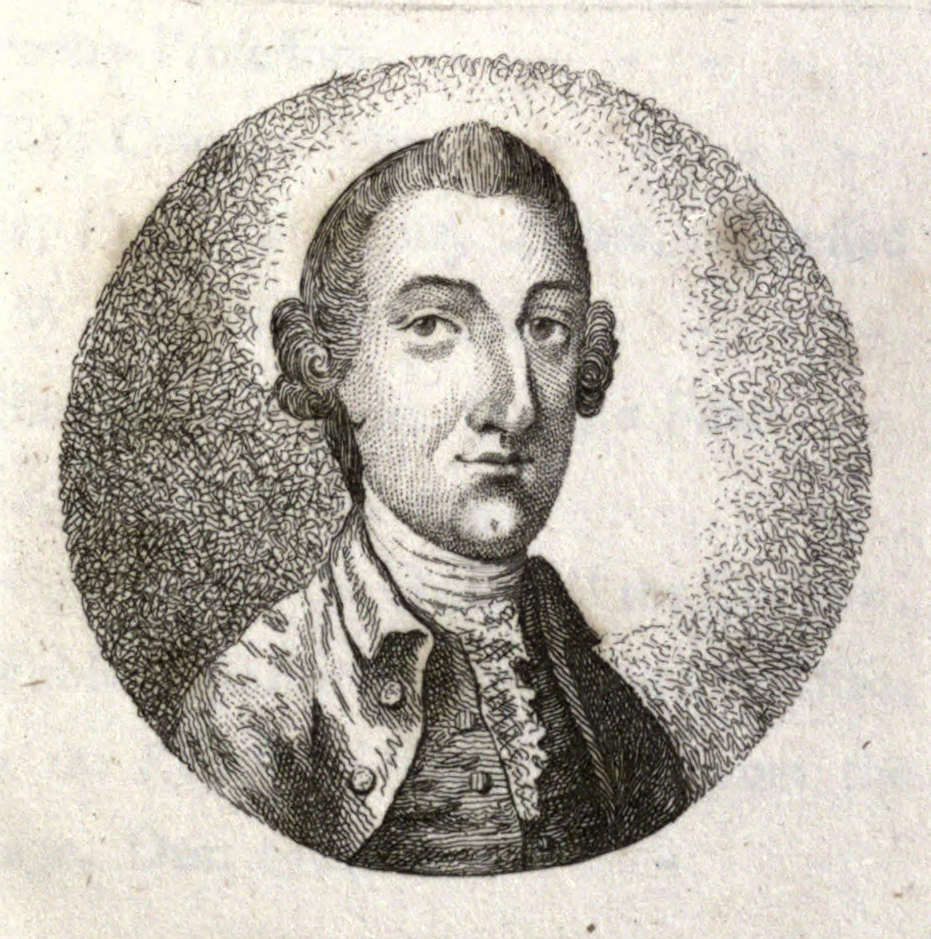
Robert Lloyd

Robert Lloyd (1733–1764) was an English poet and satirist.

Lloyd was educated at Westminster School and Trinity College, Cambridge, graduating B.A. in 1755 and M.A. in 1758. He was author of the popular poem The Actor (1760) and the comic opera The Capricious Lovers (1764), first performed at Drury Lane just a few weeks before his death. He was co-author, with George Colman, of Ode to Obscurity and Ode to Oblivion, both published in the early 1760s, and both satires on the works of the poets William Mason and Thomas Gray. He was also co-editor of St James's Magazine (1762–1763), and member of the infamous Nonsense Club of Old Westminster men with Bonnell Thornton, George Colman, William Cowper and others.

Lloyd was often in debt, and committed suicide in Fleet Prison on 15 December 1764, shortly after the death of his lifelong friend Charles Churchill, to whose sister, Patty, he was engaged. Churchill's sister died shortly after. The Dictionary of National Biography says that Lloyd joined Charles Churchill in a "reckless career of dissipation", and Vulliamy, in his biography of James Boswell, wrote that "Lloyd died when he was thirty-one, ruined by his friendship with Churchill".

== Works ==
- The Cit's Country Box (1757)
- To Obscurity (1760)
- To Oblivion (1760)
- Chit-Chat, an imitation of Theocritus
- The Actor (1760)
- The Capricious Lovers (1764)
- Spirit of Contradiction
