= George Colman the Elder =

English dramatist and essayist (1732–1794)

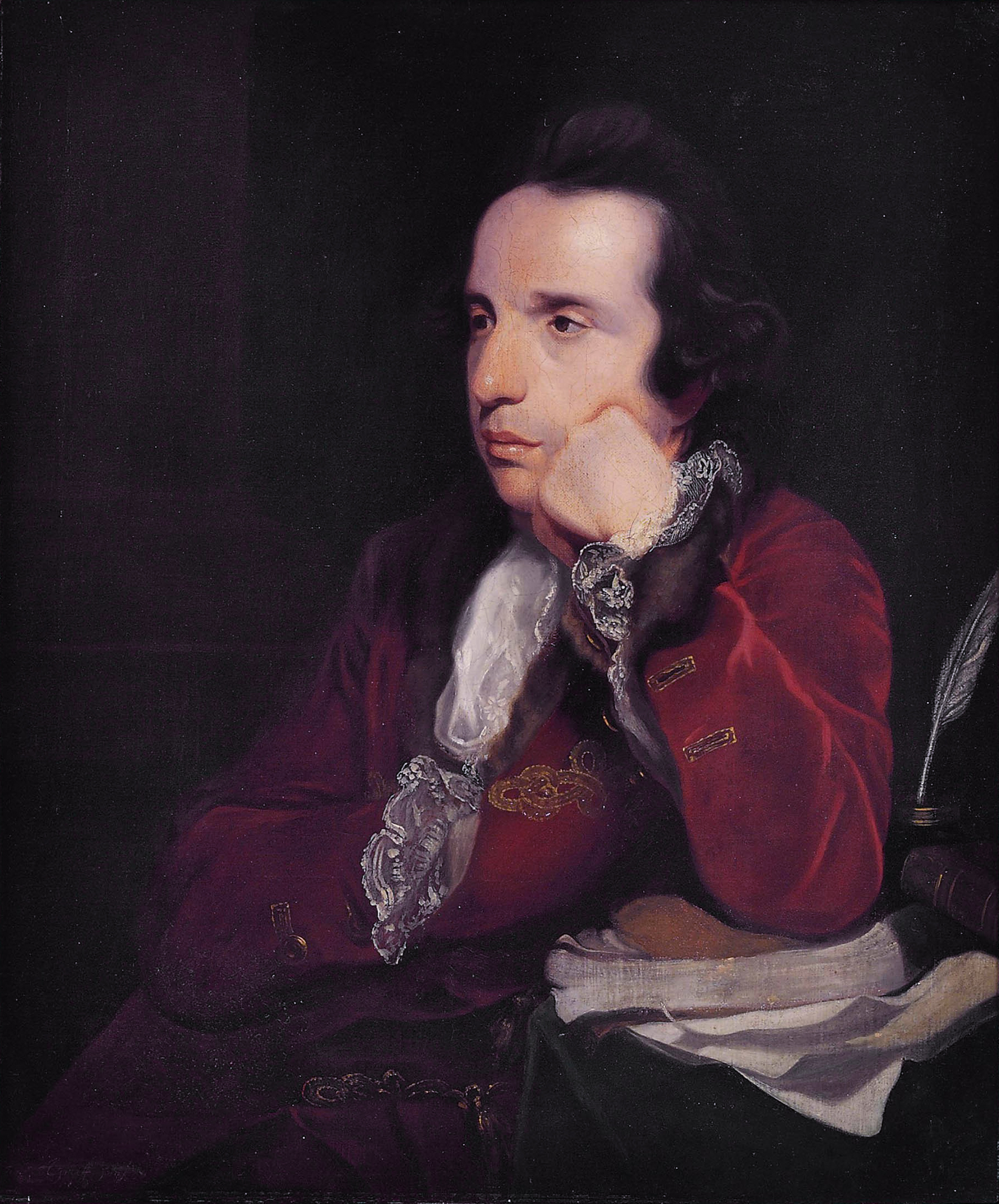
George Colman the Elder, after Joshua Reynolds, 1768–1770

George Colman (April 1732 – 14 August 1794) was an English dramatist and essayist, usually called "the Elder", and sometimes "George the First", to distinguish him from his son, George Colman the Younger. He also owned a theatre.

== Early life ==
He was born in Florence, where his father was stationed as British Resident Minister (diplomatic envoy) at the court of the Grand Duke of Tuscany. Colman's father died within a year of his son's birth and William Pulteney- afterwards Lord Bath- whose wife was Mrs. Colman's sister, undertook to educate the boy. After he received private education in Marylebone, George attended Westminster School.

Colman left school in due course for Christ Church, Oxford. There he made the acquaintance of the parodist Bonnell Thornton, with whom he co-founded The Connoisseur (1754–1756), a periodical which "wanted weight," as Johnson said, although it reached its 140th number. He left Oxford after taking his degree in 1755 and, having been entered at Lincoln's Inn before his return to London, he was called to the bar in 1757. The friendship he formed with David Garrick did not advance his career as a barrister, but he continued to practise until the death of Lord Bath, out of respect for his wishes.

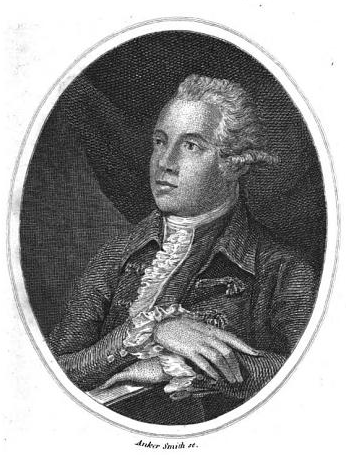
Portrait of Colman

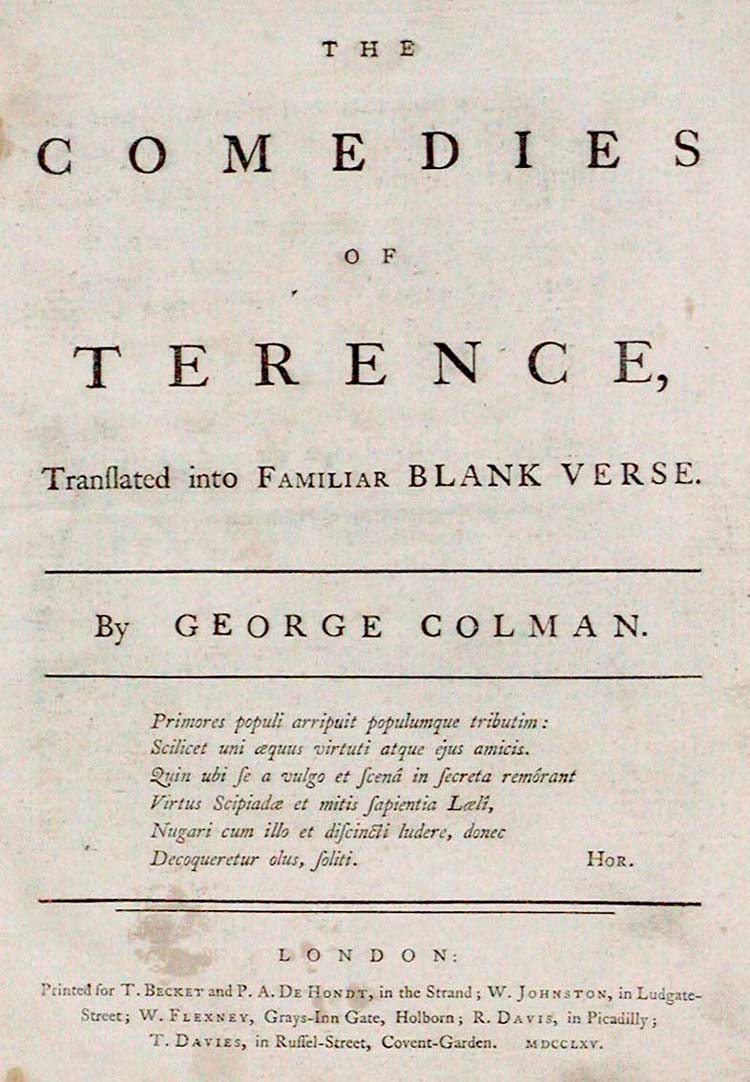
Title page of Colman's Terence, 1765

== Plays ==
In 1760, Colman produced his first play, Polly Honeycomb, which met with great success. In 1761, The Jealous Wife, a comedy founded partly on Tom Jones, made Colman famous. The death of Lord Bath in 1764 placed him in possession of independent means. In 1765, his metrical translation of the plays of Terence appeared and, in 1766, he produced The Clandestine Marriage jointly with Garrick, whose refusal to take the part of Lord Ogleby led to a quarrel between the two authors. In the next year he purchased a fourth share in the Covent Garden Theatre, which- allegedly- induced General Pulteney to revoke a will by which he had left Colman large estates. The general, who died that year, did, however, leave him a considerable annuity. A riot took place at the third performance of his play The Oxonian in Town on 9 November 1767, which a claque of card-sharpers apparently started.

== Theatre ownership ==
Colman was the acting manager of Covent Garden for seven years, during which he produced several "adapted" plays of Shakespeare. He also directed Mary Bulkley, Ann Catley and others in the première of She Stoops to Conquer there in 1773. In 1768 he was elected to the Literary Club, then nominally consisting of twelve members. In 1771 Thomas Arne's masque The Fairy Prince premièred at Covent Garden, for which Colman wrote the libretto. In 1774 he sold his share in the playhouse to James Leake, which had involved him in much litigation with his partners, and purchased the little theatre in the Haymarket from Samuel Foote three years later, broken in health and spirits by then. Colman experienced paralysis in 1785; in 1789 his brain became affected and he died on 14 August 1794. He was buried in Kensington Church.

== Other works ==
Besides the works already cited, Colman was author of adaptations of Beaumont and Fletcher's Bonduca, Ben Jonson's Epicoene and Volpone, Milton's Comus, and of other plays. He also produced an edition of the works of Beaumont and Fletcher (1778), a version of the Ars Poëtica of Horace, an excellent translation from the Mercator of Plautus for Bonnell Thornton's edition (1769–1772), some thirty plays, and many parodies and occasional pieces. An incomplete edition of his dramatic works was published in 1777 in four volumes.

== Selected plays ==
- Polly Honeycombe (1760)
- The Jealous Wife (1761)
- The Clandestine Marriage (1766)
- The Oxonian in Town (1767)
- The Suicide (1778)
- The Manager in Distress (1780)
- The Genius of Nonsense (1780)
- Tit for Tat (1786)
- The Village Lawyer (1787)
