= Lists of Marathi people =

The Marathi people of Maharashtra in India have contributed to a diverse range of fields, including the sciences, arts, politics, literatures and Sports.

- List of Maratha dynasties and states
- List of Marathi people in sports
- List of Marathi social reformers
- List of Marathi people in literature and journalism
- List of Marathi people in science, engineering and technology
- List of Marathi people in the performing arts
- List of Marathi Buddhists
