= List of Marathi people in science, engineering and technology =

This is a list of Marathi people in science, engineering and technology.

== Notables in mathematics ==
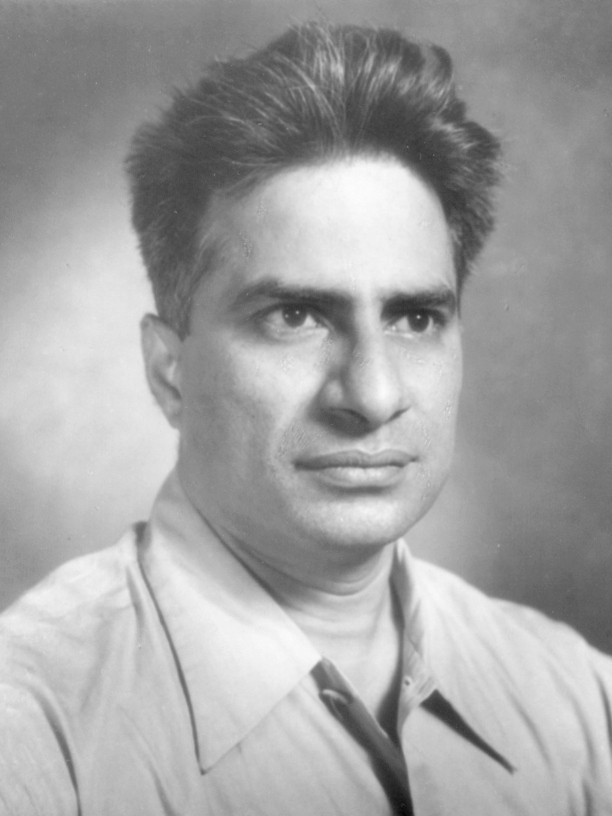
Damodar Dharmananda Kosambi

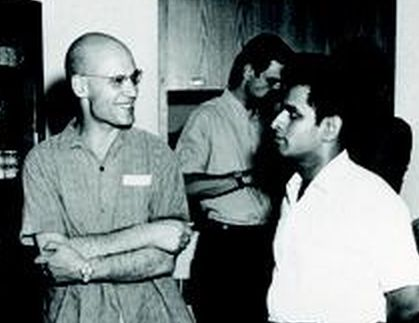
Shreeram Abhyankar (right) with Alexander Grothendieck (left), Michael Artin in the background, at Montreal, Quebec, Canada in 1970.

- R. P. Paranjpye – First Indian to become a Senior Wrangler at Cambridge University and was the principal of Fergusson College for over 20 years
- Rahul Pandharipande – Is a mathematician at the Swiss Federal Institute of Technology Zurich, he frequently collaborates with Fields medalist Andrei Okounkov
- Bhaskara II
- Damodar Dharmananda Kosambi – Was an Indian mathematician, historian and polymath.
- Chandrashekhar Khare – Professor of mathematics at the University of California Los Angeles
- Ravindra Shripad Kulkarni -is an Indian mathematician, specializing in differential geometry. He is known for the Kulkarni–Nomizu product.
- S. S. Shrikhande – Is an Indian mathematician with distinguished and well-recognized achievements in combinatorial mathematics, known for Shrikhande graph
- M. N. Vartak – Professor of Mathematics & Statistics at Indian Institute of Technology, Mumbai, specialised in balanced incomplete block designs, graph theory.
- Vinay V. Deodhar – Is a professor of mathematics at Indiana University
- Shreeram Shankar Abhyankar – Mathematician, has contributed to singularity theory and Abhyankar's conjecture
- Dinesh Thakur - Professor of mathematics at University of Rochester who works in Number Theory
- D. R. Kaprekar – Mathematician who worked on Number Theory. He is known for Kaprekar constant
- Narendra Karmarkar – Mathematician who developed Karmarkar's algorithm
- Eknath Ghate - A mathematician specialising in number theory, deals in problems connected to automorphic forms, Galois representations & special values of L-functions.
- Kapil Hari Paranjape - Involved in the promotion of Linux & GNU. Held various visiting positions at University of Chicago, University of Paris-Sud & University of Warwick.
- Rajeeva Karandikar - Director of Chennai Mathematical Institute. Visiting professor at University of North Carolina.

== Notables in physics ==
- G. H. Gaonkar – Is a professor of engineering at Florida Atlantic University, research interest is in Helicopter dynamics, Floquet theory & Large-Scale and parallel computing
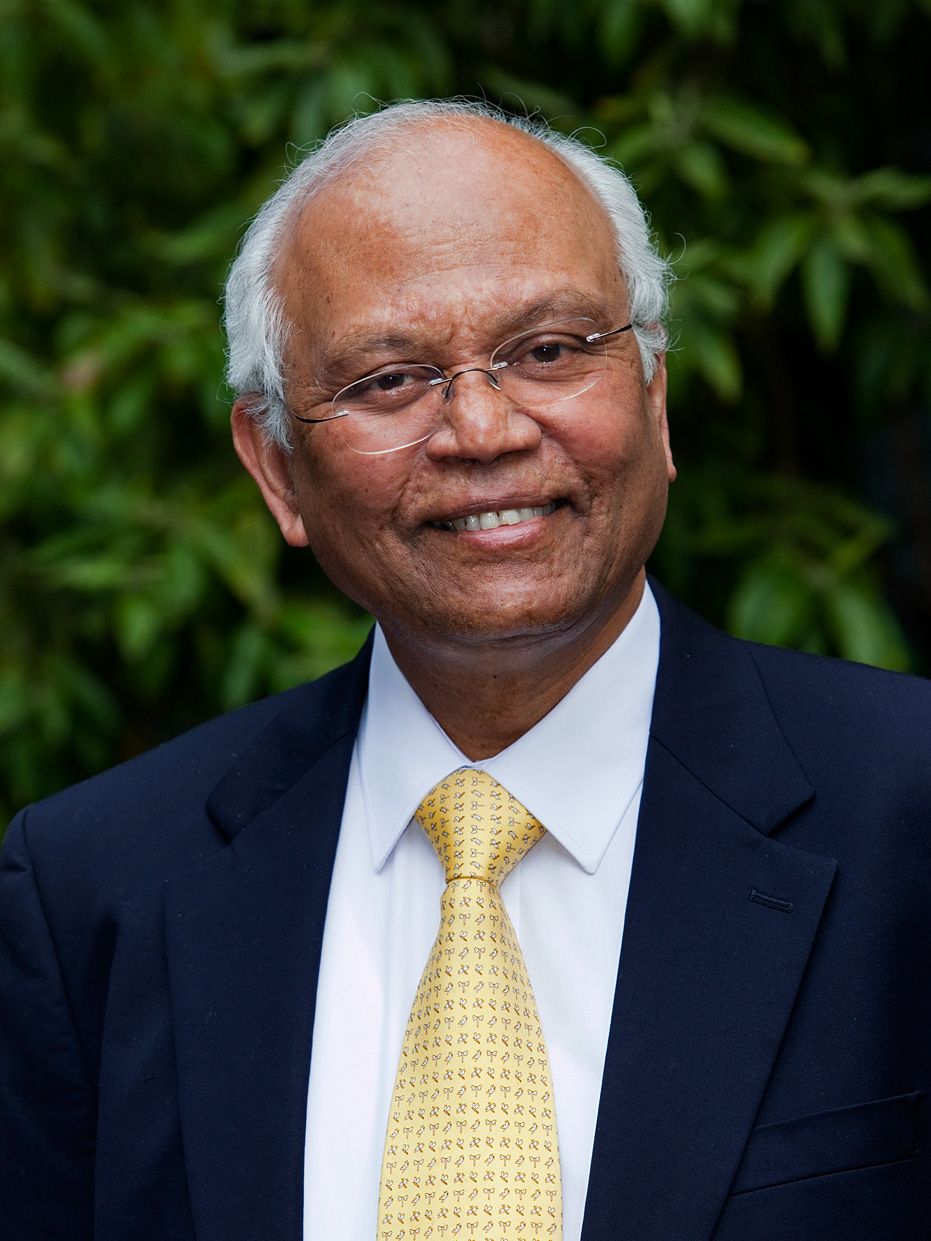
- Raghunath Anant Mashelkar
- Pramod Khargonekar – Dean, College of Engineering at the University of Florida, and researcher in the field of control systems
- Raghunath A. Mashelkar – He is the former Director General of the Council of Scientific & Industrial Research (CSIR)
- Dr. Anupam Saraph – Professor of Systems & Decision Sciences at Lally School of Management and Technology at Rensselaer Polytechnic Institute, Troy & Hartford
- Arun Nigavekar – Worked on the concepts of Physics, is a permanent member and was Vice-chairman of Asian Physics Education Network, a UNESCO organisation
- Vijay Raghunath Pandharipande – Worked at Niels Bohr Institute, was awarded the prestigious Tom W. Bonner Prize in Nuclear Physics of the American Physical Society
- Shivram Baburao Bhoje – Is an Indian scientist who worked in the field of fast-breeder nuclear reactor, became the director of IGCAR, received Padma Shri in 2003.
- Shivkar Bapuji Talpade - Is credited with having constructed India's first unmanned plane.
- Anil Kakodkar – Chairman of the Atomic Energy Commission of India, served as Director of Bhabha Atomic Research Centre. Received Padma Vibhushan in 2009.
- Shrinivas Kulkarni – Professor of Astrpophysics at the California Institute of Technology
- Waman Dattatreya Patwardhan – Indian defence scientist, developed detonation system of India's first nuclear device which was tested & codenamed Smiling Buddha.
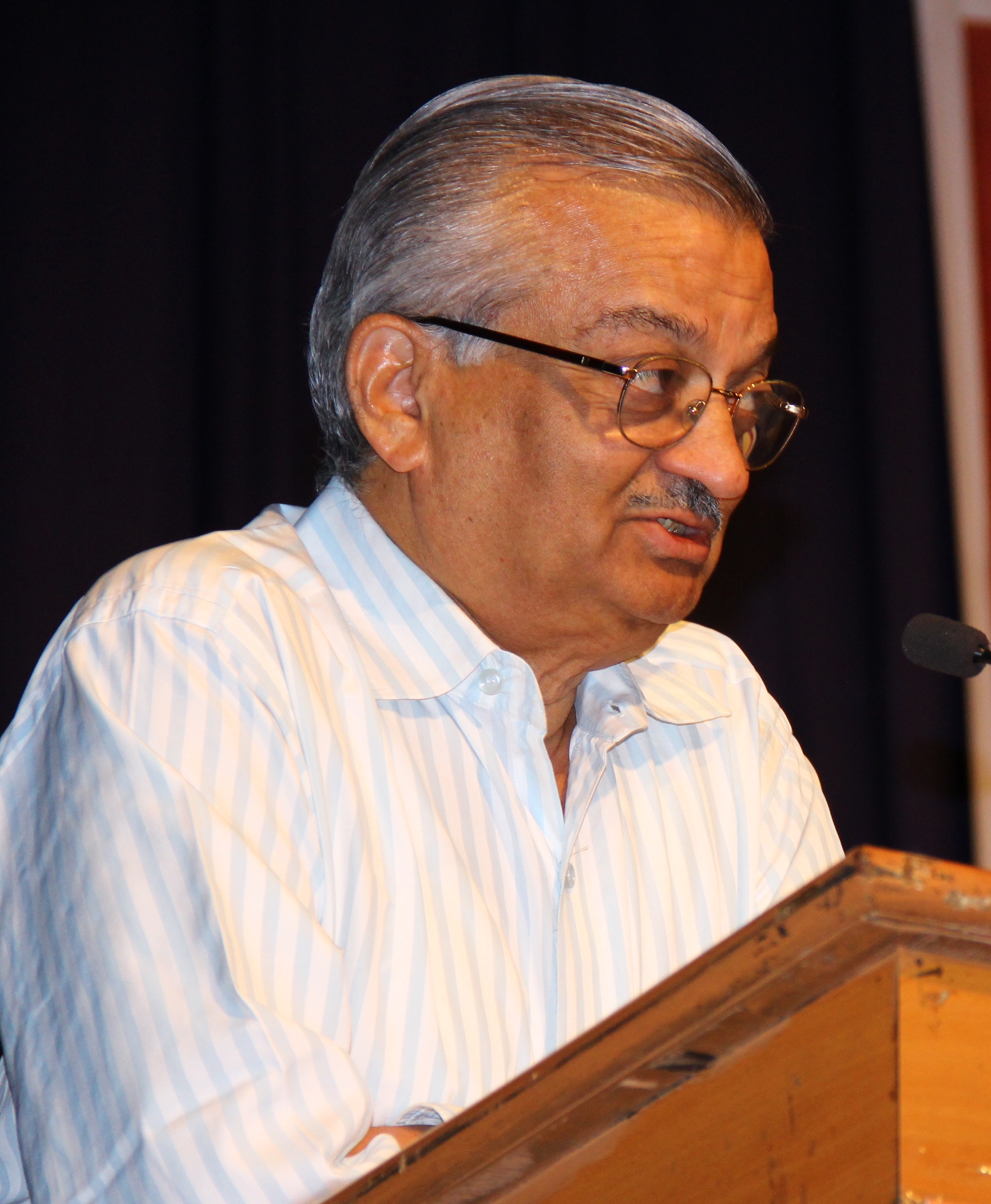
  Anil Kakodkar
- Abhay Ashtekar – Known for 'Ashtekar Variables'. He is also regarded as a founder of the theory of Loop quantum gravity
- Jayant Narlikar – Worked with Sir Fred Hoyle the conformal gravity theory, known as Hoyle–Narlikar theory, revived Albert Einstein's Theory of Relativity & Mach's Principle
- Vasudev Kalkunte Aatre – Head of the Defence Research and Development Organisation & Professor at Technical University of Nova Scotia, Halifax & IISc;Bangalore.
- Vasant Gowarikar - Indian space scientist & was awarded Padma Bhushan in the year 2008.
- Amol Dighe - Physics professor at TIFR, awarded the Shanti Swarup Bhatnagar Prize for science and technology.
- Rohini Godbole - Part of the International Detector Advisory Group (IDAG), for the International Linear Collider in the European research lab, CERN.
- Sulabha K Kulkarni - Worked on areas like Nanotechnology, Materials Science, & Surface Science. Faculty at Indian Institute of Science Education and Research.
- Suhas Pandurang Sukhatme - Studied at the Massachusetts Institute of Technology. Also served as chairman of the Atomic Energy Regulatory Board.
- Dilip Devidas Bhawalkar - Fellow of Optical Society of America & member of C-13 Committee of International Union of Pure and Applied Physics.

== Notables in chemistry ==
- Shridhar Sathe – He is professor of food science at Florida State University, also has served on several national committees of the Institute of Food Technologists panel
- Waman Bapuji Metre – Was the doyen of Indian petroleum geologist, served 40 years to oil industry of South Asia, received Padma Bhushan in 1968
- N. K. Naik – His research interest is in polymer matrix composites, textile composites, and aircraft production, also is a Fellow of National Academy of Sciences, India
- Shankar Abaji Bhise - Notable in the field of science. Several inventions out of which 40 under his belt.
- Bal Dattatreya Tilak - Chemical Engineer & Former Director of National Chemical Laboratory & recipient of Shanti Swarup Bhatnagar Prize, Padma Bhushan.
- Shridhar Ramachandra Gadre - Worked on computational quantum and theoretical chemistry, also on density functional theory & on inequalities in quantum chemistry.

== Notables in the field of computers/engineering/technology ==
- Dr. Vijay P. Bhatkar – Founder and former executive director of the Center for Development of Advanced Computing (C-DAC). Bhatkar is best known as the architect of India's national initiative in supercomputing where he led the development of Param supercomputers.
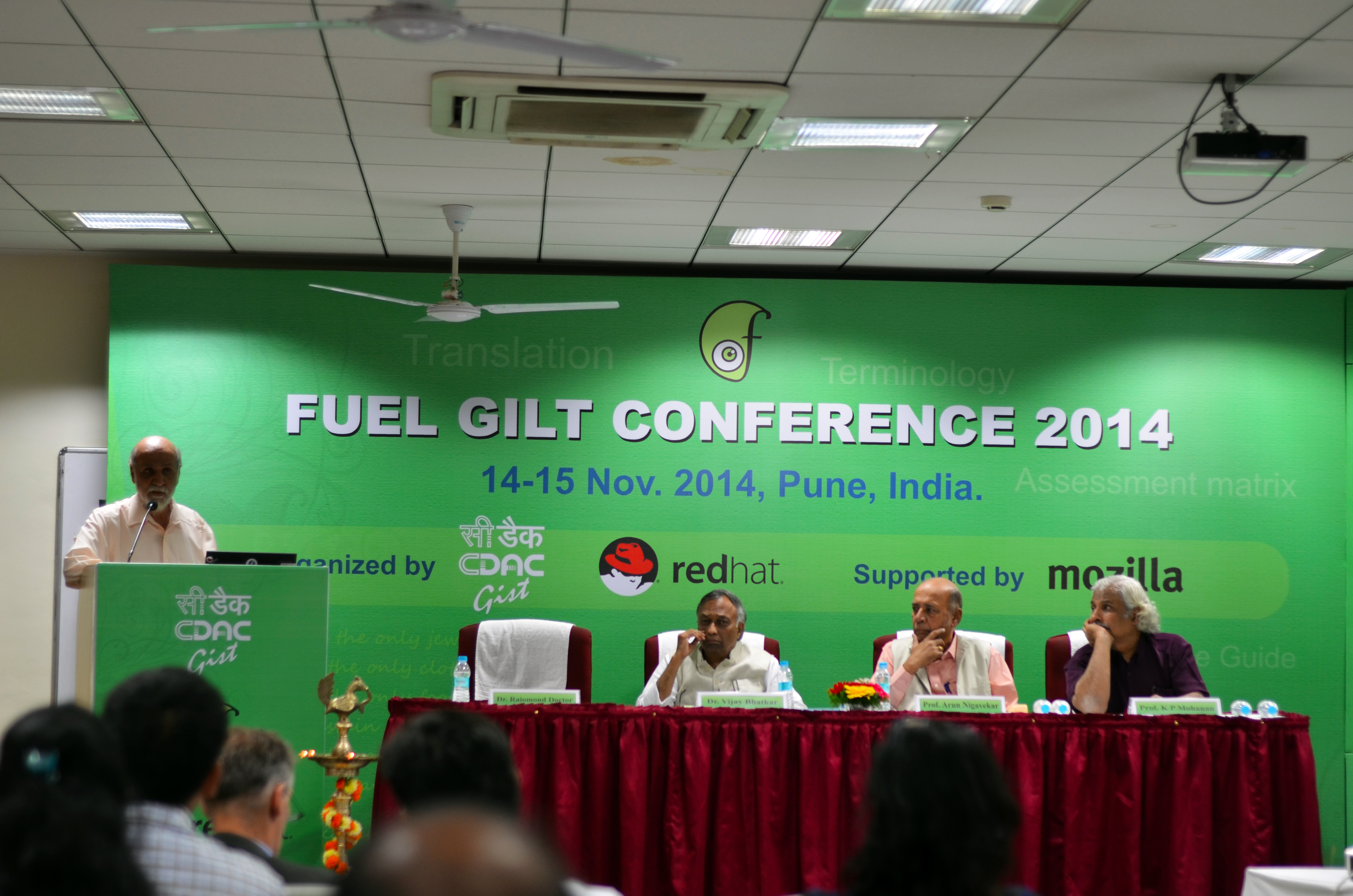
  Vijay Pandurang Bhatkar (second from left) as a chair during FUEL GILT Conference 2014 - Pune, Maharashtra
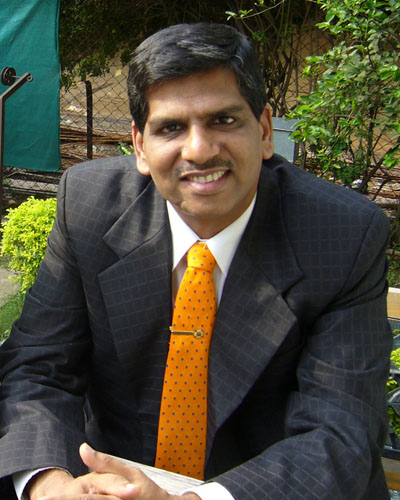
- Yashavant Kanetkar
- Suhas Patankar – Inventor of the SIMPLE algorithm for solution of Navier-Stokes equation that revolutionised the world of Computational Fluid Dynamics
- Yashavant Kanetkar – Author of many computer language books
- Aravind Joshi – Professor of Computer and Cognitive Science at the University of Pennsylvania
- Shamkant Navathe - Researcher in the field of databases. Professor at the College of Computing at Georgia Institute of Technology.
- Abhi Talwalkar - CEO of LSI Corporation, Engineering from Oregon State University, served upper management positions at Intel.
- Prashant Ranade - Did his MS in Control Engineering from the University of Cincinnati, also adjunct professor at Grand Valley State University.
- Subhash Khot - Is a theoretical computer scientist & Professor at Courant Institute of Mathematical Sciences at New York University received Alan T. Waterman Award.
- Vikas Joshi - Received master's degree from Syracuse University & CEO of Pune-based Harbinger Group with offices in Redmond, Washington & Pleasanton, California.
- Aniruddha M. Gole - Professor of Computer Engineering at University of Manitoba, Canada also fellow at NSERC & IEEE.
- Ramesh Raskar - Head of the MIT Media Lab's & associate Professor at Massachusetts Institute of Technology. Co-founded Kumbathon.
- Sunil Khandbahale - He is Sloan Fellow at MIT Sloan School of Management. Text-To-Speech for visually challenged. Received VASVIK Industrial Research Award.
- Samir Mitragotri - Professor of Chemical Engineering and Bioengineering at University of California, Santa Barbara, Member of US National Academies of Engineering, Medicine, and Inventors

== Notables in earth sciences ==
- Madhav Gadgil – ecologist, involved in establishment India's first biosphere reserve, recipient of the Shanti Swarup Bhatnagar Award for Sciences. He is also a recipient of the Volvo Environment Prize and the Tyler Prize for Environmental Achievement. The government of India awarded him the fourth highest civilian award of the Padma Shri in 1981 and followed it up with the third highest award of the Padma Bhushan in 2006.
- Ashok Gadgil – inventor of UV-disinfection method. Recipient of the National Inventors Hall of Fame, Prince Sultan bin Abdulaziz International Prize for Water—Creativity category, National Academy of Engineering (2013), Lemelson-MIT Prize, European Inventor Award and Heinz Award (2009)
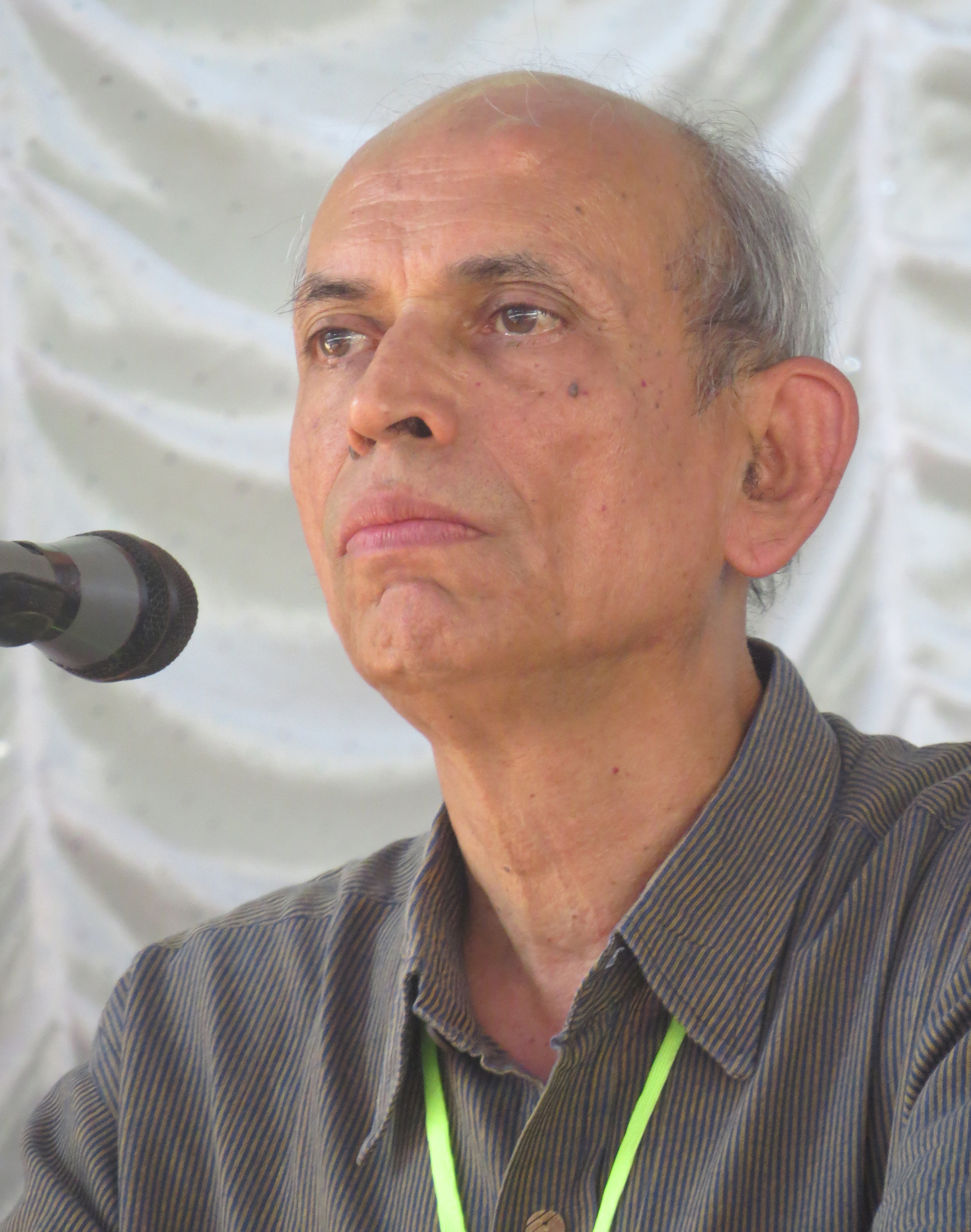
- Madhav Gadgil
- Pandurang Vasudeo Sukhatme – influential in the establishment of the Indian Agricultural Statistics Research Institute, received Padma Bhushan in 1971.
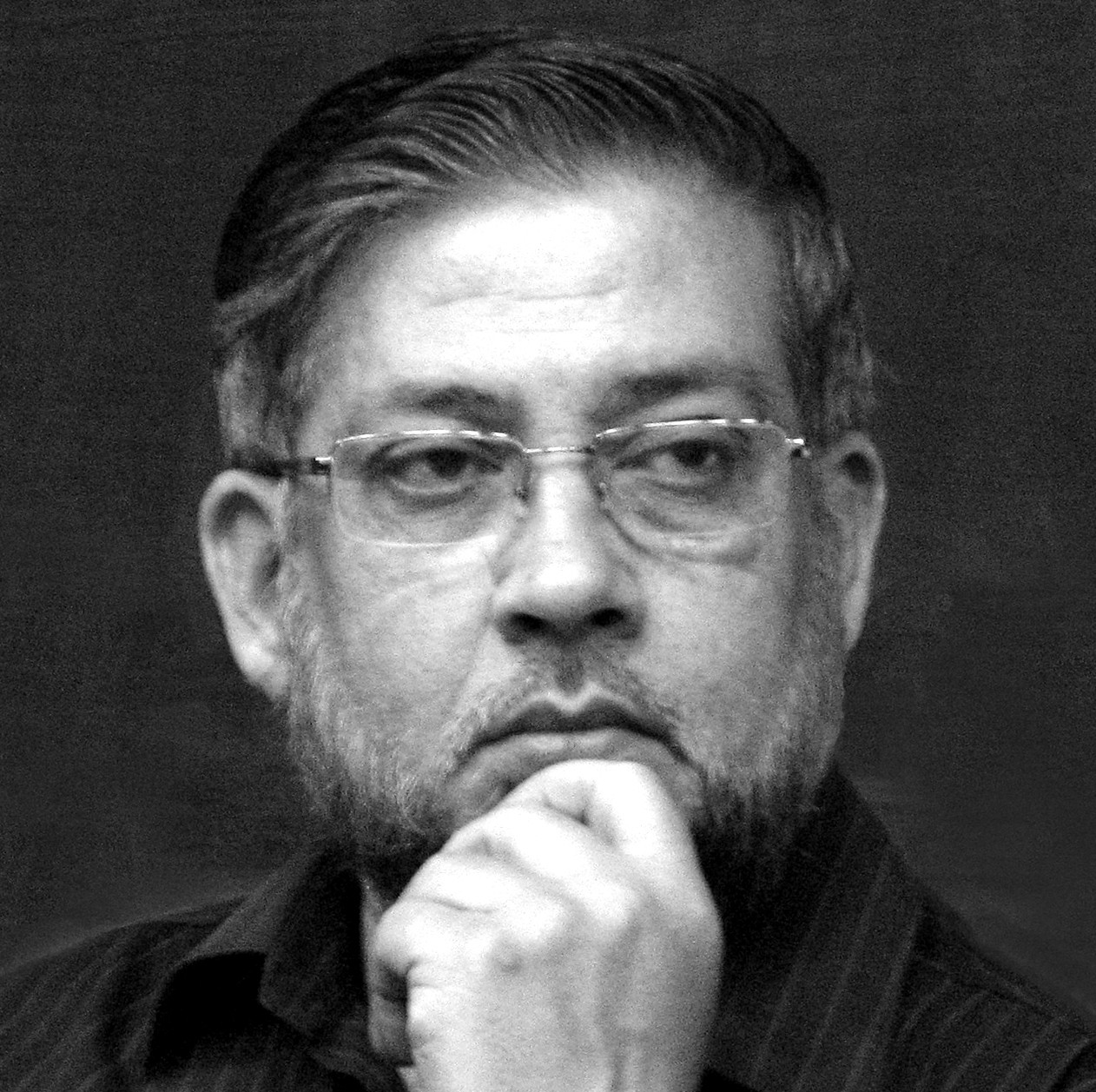
  Raghavendra Gadagkar
- Nandini Nimbkar – alumna of University of Florida and president of the Nimbkar Agricultural Research Institute
- S. B. Mujumdar – botanist, received Padma Shri in 2005
- Raghavendra Gadagkar - professor for ecological sciences, Indian Institute of Science and a foreign associate of the National Academy of Sciences, USA. He has won numerous awards for his contributions to science research including the German Cross of the Order of Merit
- Aditi Pant - oceanographer, first Indian woman, along with Sudipta Sengupta, to go to Antarctica.
- Priyadarshini Karve - joined the Appropriate Rural Technology Institute, received the Ashden Award for Renewable Energy in 2002. Recipient of the Prof. Yashwantrao Kelkar Youth Award - 2002
- Medha Khole - deputy director at the Indian Meteorological Department. Holds a master's degree in physics from the University of Pune.
- Nalini Nadkarni - Indian-American ecologist worked on Costa Rican rain forest, received John Simon Guggenheim Fellowship & faculty at The Evergreen State College.
- Shripad Dabholkar - recipient of Shanti Swarup Bhatnagar Prize for Science and Technology. He shares some common traits with Masanobu Fukuoka.

== Notables in medicine and surgery ==
- Anandibai Joshi – one of the two first Indian women to obtain a medical degree through training in Western medicine
- Dwarkanath Kotnis – doctor who helped the Chinese communists army during World War II.
- Dr.V. R. Khanolkar – first pathologist in India, "father of pathology and medical research in India"
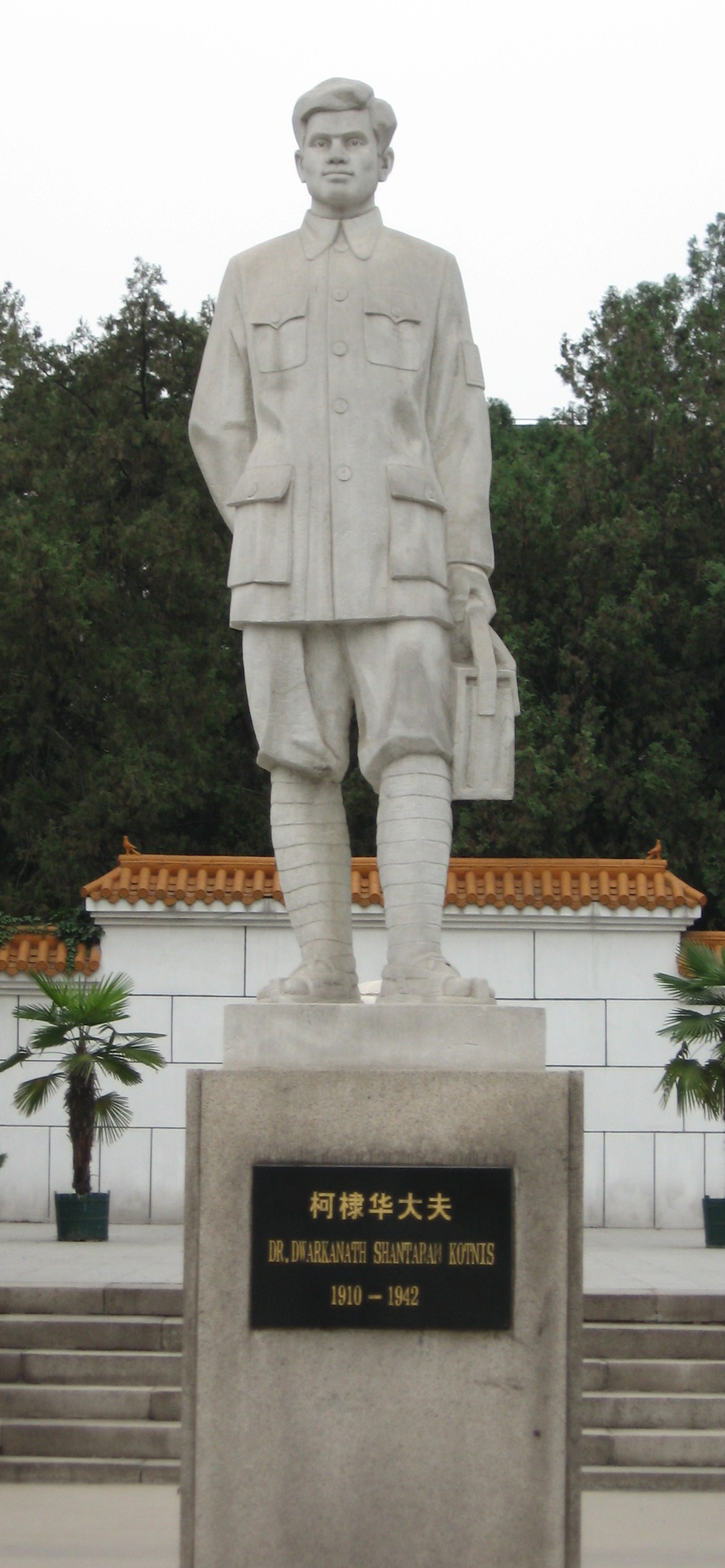
  A statue of Dwarkanath Kotnis in Shijiazhuang, Hebei, China
- Dr. Bhau Daji Laud Parsekar – prize winner for an essay on infanticide, and was appointed a teacher in the Elphinstone Institution
- Atul Gawande – general and endocrine surgeon, professor, medical author and National Book Award finalist
- Mansukh C. Wani - worked on the anticancer therapeutics. He discovered Taxol and camptothecin with Monroe Eliot Wall.
- Chetan E. Chitnis – worked on molecular parasitology and development of a vaccine for malaria, was fellow at Fogarty National Institutes of Health, Bethesda. In 1995, he was awarded the ICAAC Young Investigator Award by the American Society of Microbiology.
- Dr. Dinakar M. Salunke – first executive director of the Regional Centre for Biotechnology
- Shekhar C. Mande - director of National Centre for Cell Science, Pune
- Suresh Jayakar – biologist who pioneered in the use of quantitative approaches in genetics and biology, the director of the Genetics and Biometry Laboratory.
- Prakash Amte - awarded the Magsaysay Award, also known as "Indians first rural doctor"
- Vithal Nagesh Shirodkar – obstetrician and gynecologist, he performed the cervical cerclage operation in Paris, received Padma Vibhushan in 1971
- S. B. Mujumdar – botanist and founder of the Symbiosis International University.
- Himmatrao Bawaskar - physician who has publications several articles in The Lancet. Well known for his research on treatment for scorpion poisoning.
- Kamal Ranadive - biomedical researcher, established India's first tissue culture research laboratory at the Indian Cancer Research Centre in Mumbai.
- Iravati Karve - studied at the Kaiser Wilhelm Institute of Anthropology, Human Heredity, and Eugenics, worked as administrator at SNDT Women's University in Mumbai.
- Shubha Tole - a neuroscientist and principal investigator at the Tata Institute of Fundamental Research in Mumbai.

== See also ==
  - List of Marathi people in sports
  - List of Marathi social reformers
  - List of Marathi people in literature and journalism
  - List of Marathi People in the performing arts
