= List of Marathi people in literature and journalism =

This page is a list of Marathi people in literature and journalism.

== Literature ==
Narayan Hari Apte

- Bhavabhuti – was an 8th-century Sanskrit scholar of India noted for his plays and poetry.
- Narayan Hari Apte – screenplay writer of famous Duniya Na Mane/Kunku (Marathi cinema) based on his novel "Na Patnari Goshta"
- Arun Kolatkar – poet of 20th century Marathi poetry, His poetry had an influence on modern Marathi poets. His first book of English poetry, Jejuri, is a collection 31 poems pertaining to a visit of his to a religious place with the same name Jejuri in Maharashtra; the book won Commonwealth Writers' Prize in 1977.
- Pu La Deshpande – Marathi writer and musician, He was also an accomplished film and stage actor, music composer, harmonium player, singer, and orator. He was often referred to as "Maharashtrache Laadke Vyaktimatva" (roughly translated as "Maharashtra's beloved personality").
- Ram Ganesh Gadkari – Playwright
- Satish Alekar –a Marathi playwright, actor, and theatre director, a Marathi playwright, actor, and theatre director. A founder member of the Theatre Academy of Pune.He is one of the most influential and progressive playwrights not just in modern Marathi theatre, but also larger modern Indian theatre. He was awarded the Sangeet Natak Akademi Award in Playwriting (Marathi) in 1994, by Sangeet Natak Akademi, India's National Academy of Music, Dance and Drama. He received the award "Padamshree" in January 2012.
- G. A. Kulkarni – was a legendary Sahitya Akademi Award winner Marathi writer of short stories.
- Vijay Tendulkar – Contemporary Indian playwright
- V P Kale - Marathi writer and storyteller
- Vasant Kanetkar – Playwright
- V.S. Khandekar – Jnanpith Award winner of 1974
- Acharya Atre – Popular satirist, editor, activist and writer
- Namdev Dhasal – Poet, writer and columnist
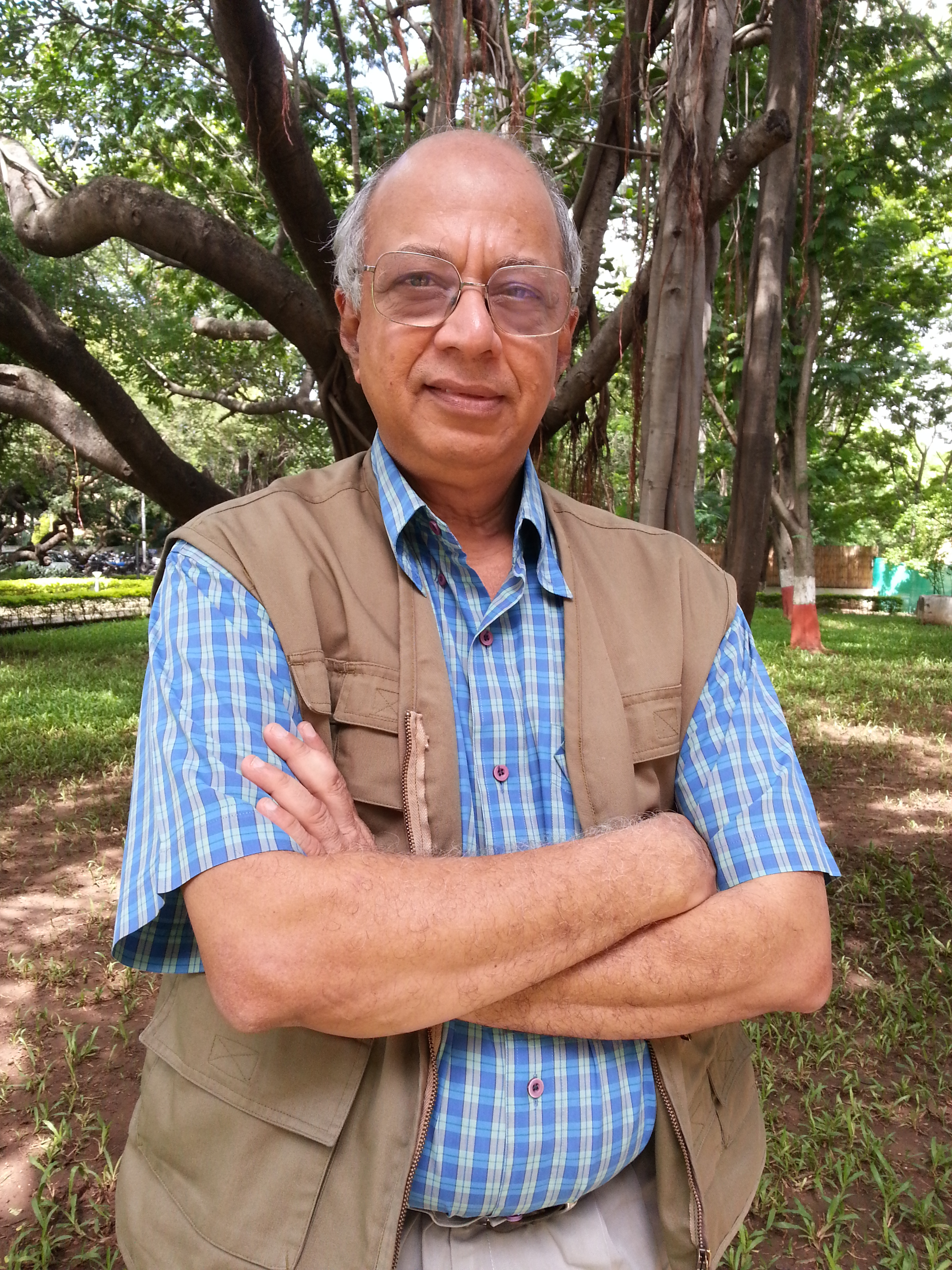
- Satish Alekar
- Laxman Mane – Writer from depressed tribal caste, Known for novels Upara, Uchlya
- Bahinabai Chaudhari – Famous Ahirani poet
- Daya Pawar – Autobiographical writer of "Balut"
- Hari Narayan Apte – (म्हैसूरचा वाघ) was his first historical novel on Tipu Sultan
- Vishram Bedekar – Novelist
- Malati Bedekar – Feminist story writer
- Jaywant Dalvi – Playwright
- Hamid Dalwai – Novelist and social activist
- Bhalachandra Nemade – Novelist
- Mahesh Elkunchwar – Playwright
- Gangadhar Gadgil – Writer
- Shridhar Bhaskar Warnekar – Wrote many Sanskrit poems and verses, won Sahitya Akademi Award for Sanskrit
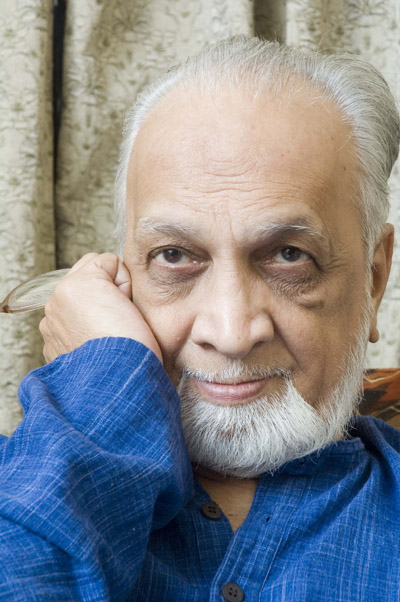
- Vijay Tendulkar
- Madhu Limaye – was an Indian Socialist essayist and activist
- Gajanan Digambar Madgulkar – Modern Valmiki of India
- Shivaji Sawant – writer of Mritunjay
- Suresh Bhat – Gajhalkar.
- Suhas Shirvalkar – Novelist and suspense, thriller story writer. Duniyadari, Devaki are the two films based on his books. Samantar is the webseries based on his book.
- Vishnu Vaman Shirwadkar – "Kusumagraj", Jnanapeeth awardee
- D. M. Mirasdar – Writer on rural characters
- Ratnakar Matkari – Supernatural story writer
- Dilip Chitre – Poet, translator, filmmaker
- Saleel Wagh – Poet
- Narayan Gangaram Surve – Received Padma Shri in 1998, for excellence in Literature
- Vishwas Patil – Writer of "Panipat"
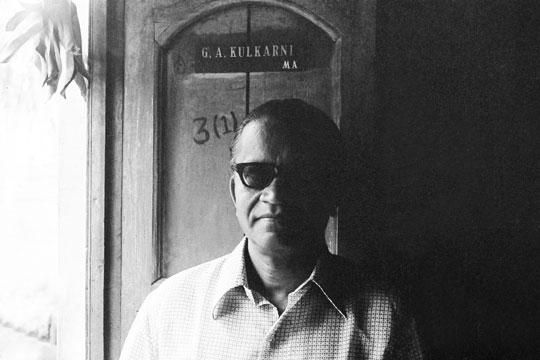
- G. A. Kulkarni
- Hemant Divate – Poet and Editor/Publisher of Poetry
- Manya Joshi – New generation poet
- Vilas Sarang
- Shanta Shelke – Classical Poet
- Indira Sant – Classical Poet
- Arun Sadhu – Non Fictional writer, biographer, journalist
- Vinda Karandikar – Jnanpith Award winner of 2003
- Madhu Mangesh Karnik – Writer
- Irawati Karve – Writer, critic
- Purushottam Bhaskar Bhave – Was president of Marathi Sahitya Sammelan in Pune

== Historians ==
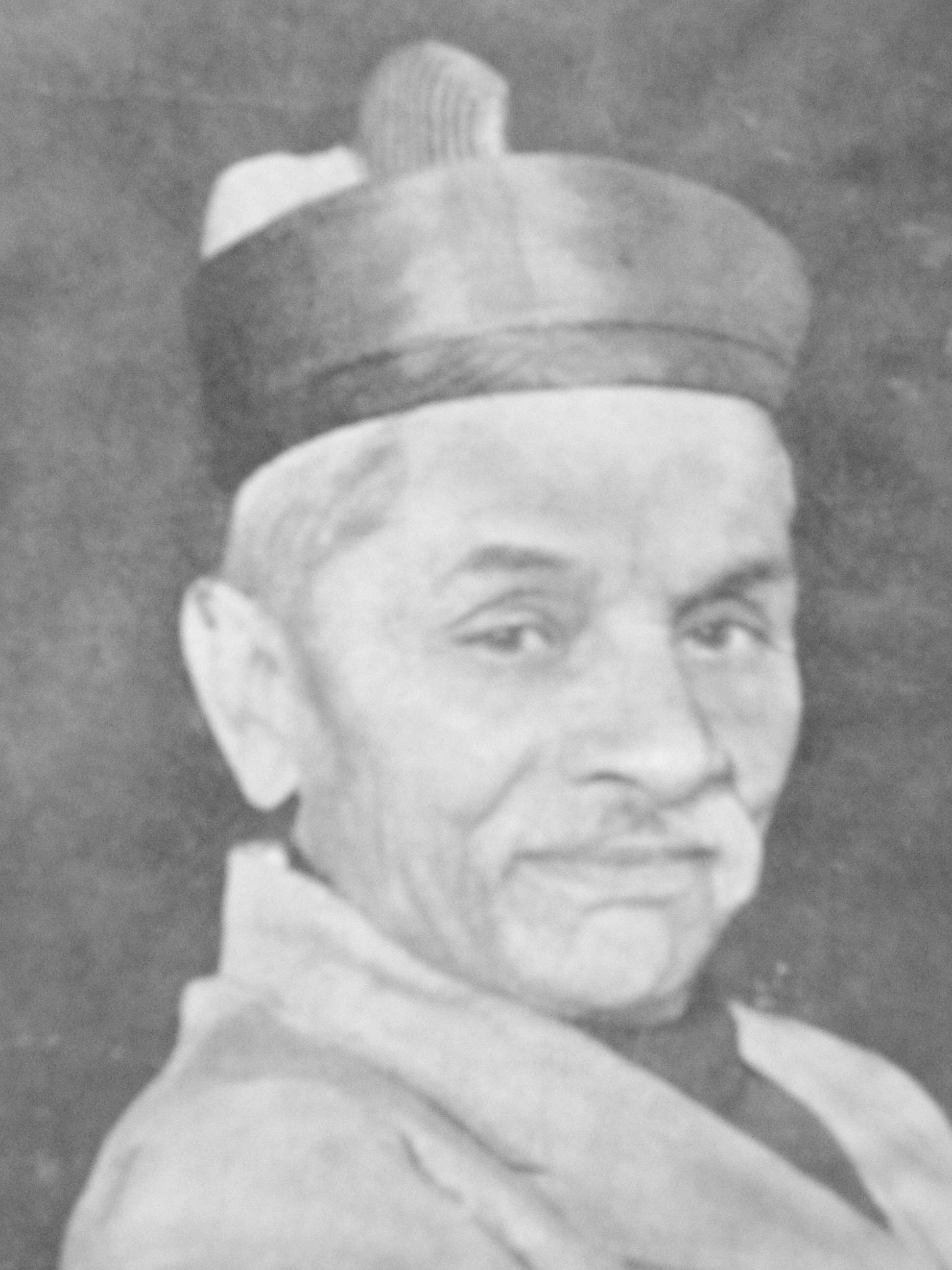
Govind Sakharam Sardesai

- Govind Sakharam Sardesai – Historian and writer
- Vasudeo Sitaram Bendrey – Historian who discovered first image of Chhatrapati Shivaji Maharaj, wrote first full-proof biography of Chhatrapati Sambhaji Maharaj and wrote on whole Shivshahi period.
- Vithal Krishnaji Khedkar – Was one of the founders of Prarthana Samaj in Bombay & original author of a book later published The Divine Heritage of the Yadavas
- Ninad Bedekar – Historian and writer
- Vishwas Patil – "Panipatkar", recipient of Bhartiya Parishad Award, Gadkari Award & several other prestigious awards
- Datto Vaman Potdar – Due to vast knowledge he was called Dr. Johnson of Maharashtra or a living encyclopaedia, the Government of India had honoured Potdar with the title Mahamahopadhyaya (महामहोपाध्याय) in 1946, and Padma bhushan in 1967.
- Vishnushastri Krushnashastri Chiplunkar – His articles introduced reader to "Western" tradition of literacy criticism
- Vishwanath Kashinath Rajwade – He was considered to be the first in real sense to undertake an immense research of Maratha history
- Dattatraya Ganesh Godse – Historian, playwright, art critic, he received a Sangeet Natak Akademi Award in 1988
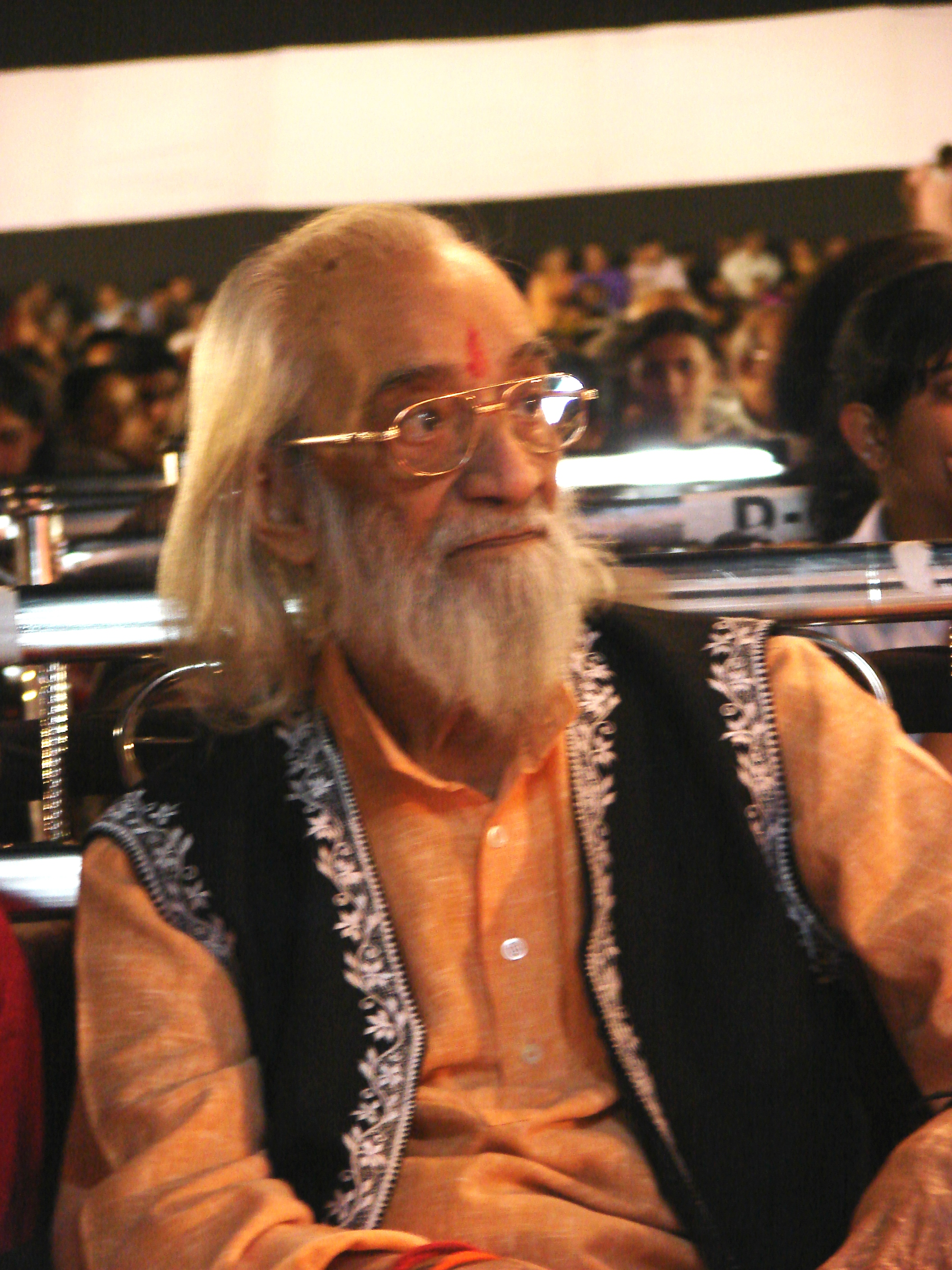
  Babasaheb Purandare
- Tryambak Shankar Shejwalkar - was the first historian to study the Third Battle of Panipat
- Vasudev Vishnu Mirashi – For his vital contribution to the Indian history he was honoured with the title Mahamahopadhyaya (महामहोपाध्याय) by the British Indian Government in 1941. He was also awarded Padma bhushan in 1975 by the President of India.
- Anant Sadashiv Altekar – In 1947 Altekar was elected the First Chairman of the Numismatic Society of India
- Shridhar Venkatesh Ketkar – His doctoral thesis was later published as The History of Caste in India (volume 1), which determines the date of Manusmriti
- Babasaheb Purandare – Historian who researched Shivaji
- Annabhau Sathe – He was a founder member of the Lal Bawta Kalapathak of the Communist Party in Maharashtra, people conferred the epithet Lok Shahir
- Gangadhar Pathak – Historian and writer
- Sadashiv Ranade – Historian and genealogist

== Columnists and Journalists ==
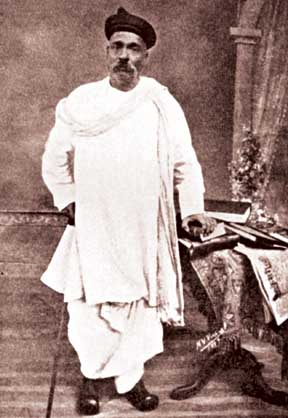
Bal Gangadhar Tilak

- Bal Gangadhar Tilak - an Indian nationalist, journalist, teacher, social reformer, lawyer and an independence activist. He was the first leader of the Indian Independence Movement. The British colonial authorities called him "Father of the Indian unrest". Tilak used to run his two newspapers, Kesari, in Marathi and Mahratta in English.
- Gopal Ganesh Agarkar (14 July 1856 – 17 June 1895), He was the first editor of the weekly Kesari and founder and editor of periodical Sudhaarak.
- Nanasaheb Parulekar (20 September 1898 – 8 January 1973), a founder of Marathi-language newspaper Sakal and chairman of the Press Trust of India, a news agency.
- Bal Thackeray, cartoonist for The Free Press Journal and founder of Marathi-language newspaper Saamana and Hindi-language newspaper Dophar Ka Saamana
- Anubha Bhonsle, a television and print journalist, a winner of the Ramnath Goenka Award for Best Political Reporter, 2012 and the Chameli Devi Award for Woman Media Person of the Year, 2014.
- Nikhil Wagle - He established the Marathi and Hindi newspaper Mahanagar. In mid-2000s, Wagle joined the Network 18 group. He became the editor-in-chief of IBN Lokmat, a Marathi news channel. He resigned in July 2014.
- Shobhaa De – Columnist, author and publisher, she is the cousin of ace photographer Gautam Rajadhyaksha
- Nanasaheb Parulekar – Founder Editor of Sakal
- Uttam Kamble – Is the Chief Editor of Sakal Media Group, into journalism for the past 30 years
- Balshastri Jambhekar – Father of Marathi journalism, Founder of Darpan
- Vidyadhar Gokhale – Playwright, poet and former Editor of daily Loksatta
- Govind Talwalkar – Former Editor of daily Maharashtra Times
- Sanjay Raut – Author columnist and Editor of daily Saamana
- Vaman Gopal Joshi – Editor of Rashtramat and Swatantra Hindustan during the freedom struggle of India
- Arun Sadhu – Was as a professor and the head of the Department of Communication and Journalism at Pune University

== See also ==
- List of Marathi people in sports
- List of Marathi social reformers
- List of Marathi people in the performing arts
