= Khandbahale.com =

Khandbahale.com is a language company founded in 1998 and headquartered in Nashik, India.

The company is founded by Sunil Khandbahale.

== Overview ==
The company is a digital multilingual translation platform available in 23 languages. It is created to help students for second language acquisition through their native languages.

The company is also known for creating offline short message service (SMS) for translating words on feature phone having no access to internet especially in rural areas.

== Awards ==
The company has received VASVIK Industrial Research Award, 2014.
