= Ramez Elmasri =

Computer scientist (1950–2022)

- Born: 20 October 1950; Giza, Egypt
- Died: 14 May 2022 (aged 71)
- Scientific career
- Fields: Computer science, database systems
- Workplaces: The University of Texas at Arlington (Arlington, Texas) (1990–2022); University of Houston (1982–1990)

Ramez A. Elmasri (20 October 1950 – 14 May 2022) was an Egyptian-American computer scientist and a noted researcher in the field of database systems. He was also professor and associate chairman in the department of Computer Science and Engineering at The University of Texas at Arlington, Arlington, Texas. He was best known as the co-author of seven editions of the textbook: "Fundamentals of Database Systems" (with Shamkant Navathe, published by Pearson, edition 7, 2015). It has been a leading textbook in the database area worldwide for over 25 years. It is now in its seventh edition, having been translated into Spanish, German, French, Italian, Portuguese, Chinese, Korean, Greek, Euskara (Basque language), and Arabic. His book is used as a standard textbook in India, Pakistan, Europe, South Africa, Australia and South East Asia, and is also widely used in the US, Canada, and South America. He had worked at the University of Texas at Arlington since 1990 and had supervised 16 Ph.D. and more than 200 M.S. projects/theses.

== Education ==
Elmasri received his B.S. degree in electrical engineering (computers and automatic control) from Alexandria University, Alexandria, Egypt in 1972 and received M.S. and Ph.D. degrees in computer science from Stanford University, Stanford, California, in 1980. His dissertation title (advisor: Gio Wiederhold) was "On the Design and Integration of Data Models", and it was one of the first research works on the two topics of "(i). Schema Integration", and "(ii). Query Languages for Entity-Relationship Models". It also examined in-depth how to add structural constraints to the relational model, by proposing the "Structural Model". Many of these constraints are now part of the SQL standards.

== Career ==
Elmasri was appointed a faculty member at IFRICS (Institute for Retraining in Computer Science, Clarkson University, Potsdam, New York, where he taught the database course at the institute from 1984 to 1985. He was also a summer research fellow at the Rome Air Development Center, Rome Laboratory, Rome, New York, in 1987. He there conducted research on incorporating databases for distributed real-time systems. He has also worked as a consultant for Bell Communication Research (now Telcordia Technologies) at Piscataway, New Jersey, in 1989, where he conducted research on data models, query languages and indexing techniques for temporal databases. In 1990 he conducted research on enhancing capabilities of the data cycle architecture. He was also a visiting professor at The University of Zurich in Switzerland, where he conducted research on active and object-oriented databases in 1991. He was appointed a faculty associate at the Automation and Robotics Research Institute (ARRI), the University of Texas at Arlington, Arlington, Texas. His research there focused on system integration, object-oriented software, concurrent engineering and agile manufacturing. He was also a principal research scientist at Honeywell International, Inc., Corporate Technology Center, Bloomington, Minnesota, where he worked on design and implementation of the DDTS (Distributed Database Testbed System) from 1980 to 1982. From 1982 to 1990 he was a faculty member at The University of Houston, Texas. From 1990 he had been a faculty member at The University of Texas at Arlington, Texas, where he was also the associate chair of the Computer Science and Engineering Department since 2011. From 2003 he was a consultant for various law firms, where he consulted on patent analysis and patent infringement cases and on software copyright infringement cases.

== Bibliography ==
Books and book chapters written by Ramez Elmasri:

- Fundamentals of Database Systems, "Seventh Edition", with S. Navathe, Addison-Wesley Pearson, 2015.
- Fundamentals of Database Systems, "Sixth Edition", with S. Navathe, Addison-Wesley Pearson, 2011.
- SEEC: A Dual Search Engine for Business Employees and Customers, with k. Taha, in Service and Business Computing Solutions with XML: Application for Quality Management and Best Processes, (book chapter), IGI Global Publishing, 2009.
- Operating Systems: A Spiral Approach, with A.G. Carrick and D. Levine, McGraw-Hill, 2009.
- Fundamentals of Database Systems, "Fifth Edition", with S. Navathe, Addison-Wesley, 2007.
- Modeling Biomedical Data, with F. Ji and J. Fuuu, Chapter 3 in Data Modeling for Biological Applications, A. Sidhu and J. Chen (editors), Artech House Publishing, 2007.
- Fundamentals of Database Systems, "Fourth Edition" with S. Navathe, Addison-Wesley, 2003.
- Ontology Extraction and Conceptual Modeling for Web Information, with H. Han, Chapter IX in Information Modeling for Internet Applications, P.van Bommel (editor), Idea Group Publishing, 2003.
- Fundamentals of Database Systems, "Third Edition", with S. Navathe, Addison-Wesley, 2000.
- Fundamentals of Database Systems, "Second Edition", with S. Navathe, Addison-Wesley, 1994.
- Fundamentals of Database Systems, with S. Navathe, Benjamin/Cummings Publishing Co., 1989.

== Honors, awards and patents ==
1. Fulbright Specialist, January 2011 – May 2022.
2. UTB College of Engineering Faculty Development Leave, Fall 2002.
3. Robert Q. Lee Teaching Excellence Award, College of Engineering, The University of Texas at Arlington, February 1999.
4. The Time Index Access Structure for Temporal Databases Having Concurrent Multiple Versions, US Patent 5,440,730 with G. Wuu Bellcore, 1995.
5. Associate Chairman at UTA, later succeeded by Ashraf Aboulnaga.
