= List of Marathi social reformers =

This page is a list of Marathi social reformers.

== Vinoba Bhave ==
Vinoba Bhave is well known for the Bhoodan Movement. On 18 April 1951He was a winner at ji Pochampally of Nalgonda, the Bhoodan Movement. He took donated land from landowner Indians and gave it away to the poor and landless, for them to cultivate. Then after 1954, he started to ask for donations of whole villages in a programme he called Gramdan. He got more than 1000 villages by way of donations. Out of these, he obtained 175 donated villages in Tamil Nadu alone. Noted Gandhian and atheist Lavanam was the interpreter of Vinoba Bhave during his land reform movement in Andhra Pradesh and parts of Orissa.

In 1958 Vinoba was the first recipient of the international Ramon Magsaysay Award for Community Leadership. He was awarded with the highest civilian award of India. The Bharat Ratna posthumously in 1983.

== Dhondo Keshav Karve ==
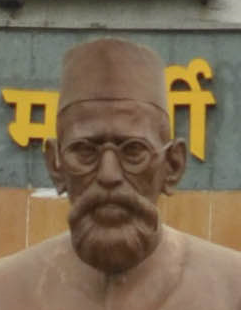
Dhondo Keshav Karve

Social reformer and educator, Dhondo Keshav Karve is widely known for his work related to woman education and remarriage of Hindu widows. He established the Widow Marriage Association (1883), Hindu Widows Home (1896), and started Shreemati Nathibai Damodar Thackersey Women's University in 1916. He was popularly known as Maha-rushi maharshi meaning great sage. The Government of India awarded him its highest civilian award, the Bharat Ratna, in 1958, the year of his 100th birthday.

The film "DhayasaParva" by Amol Palekar, based on the life of Karve's son Raghunath, also depicts the Karve family, and their social reformation projects.

== Dr. Babasaheb Ambedkar ==
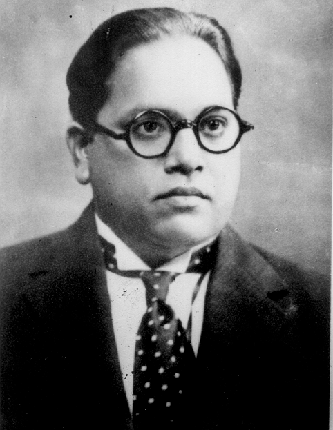
Babasaheb Ambedkar

Dr. B. R. Ambedkar was a reformer, politician, economist, and scholar, Indian jurist, educationist, philosopher, Buddhist activist, thinker, anthropologist and historian. A Social reformer who inspired the Modern Buddhist Movement and campaigned against social discrimination against Untouchables (Dalits), while also supporting the rights of women and labour. He was Independent India's first law minister and the principal architect of the Constitution of India.

He became involved in campaigning and negotiations for India's independence, publishing journals advocating political rights and social freedom for Dalits, and contributing significantly to the establishment of the state of India.

In 1990, the Bharat Ratna, India's highest civilian award, was posthumously conferred upon Ambedkar. Dr.Ambedkar's legacy includes numerous memorials and depictions in popular culture.

== Vinayak Damodar Savarkar ==
Vinayak Damodar Savarkar was a socialfighter, politician, lawyer, writer, social reformer and formulator.

He advocated dismantling the system of caste in society. Savarkar's social reforms in Ratnagiri were during the period of 1924–1937. In 1931, the Patit Pavan Mandir was established with the financial help from Bhagoji Seth Keer under the leadership of Savarkar which was open to all Hindus and it had trust representation from all castes including those from th ex-untouchable caste. He was first to start the concept of saha-bhojan. On 1 May 1933, Savarkar started a pan Hindu cafe for all castes. Savarkar popularised the term Hindutva, denoting the essence of Hindu, which was originally coined by Chandranath Basu in 1892. Savarkar is considered to be the father of Hindu Nationalism in India. His tract, Essentials of Hindutva, better known under the later title Hindutva: Who Is a Hindu?, defined a Hindu as one who regarded India as his fatherland as well as holy land. The three essentials of Hindutva were said to be the common nation (rashtra), common race (jati) and common culture/civilisation (sanskriti).

== Mahatma Jyotiba Phule ==
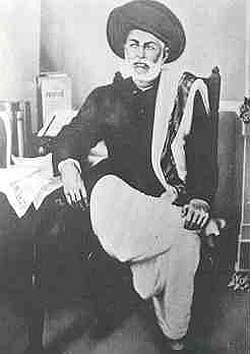
Jyotiba Phule

Jyotiba Phule, an Indian activist, thinker, social reformer, writer and theologist from Maharashtra. He and his wife, Savitribai Phule, were pioneers of women's education in India. His work extended to many fields including education, agriculture, caste system, women and widow upliftment and removal of untouchability. He is most known for his efforts to educate women and the lower castes as well as the masses. After educating his wife, he opened the first school for girls in India in August 1848.

In September 1873, Phule, along with his followers, formed the Satyashodhak Samaj (Society of Seekers of Truth) to attain equal rights for peasants and people from lower castes.

== Nanaji Deshmukh ==
Nanaji Deshmukh established Chitarkoot Gramodya Vishwavidyalaya in Chitrakoot- India's First Rural University and was its Chancellor. Nanaji implemented the philosophy of integral humanism to improve the living standard of more than 150 villages of Bundelkhand.

He was awarded Padma Vibhushan in 1999. India's former President A.P.J. Abdul Kalam praised Deshmukh for his "single-minded devotion to the uplift of the people".

== Sindhutai Sapkal ==
- Sindhutai Sapkal, affectionately known as the "Mother of Orphans", is an Indian social worker and social activist known particularly for her work in raising orphaned children in India.

She has adopted more than 1800orphans .She was conferred a Doctorate in Literature by the DY Patil Institute of Technology and Research in 2016.

- Daughter of a cowherd and abandoned wife of a poor farmer Sindhutai has been through a lot of hardships and even planned to commit suicide until she discovered the goal of her life to devote herself to the orphans.
- She was awarded the Nari Shakti Award in 2017 by the President of INDIA which is the highest civilian award for women, Mother Teresa Awards, Ahilyabai Holkar Award, given by the Government of Maharashtra to social workers in the field of woman and child welfare, The National Award for Iconic Mother(first recipient) and many other such national awards from government and organisations. She has been awarded with more than 750 awards worldwide for her work.
- In 2010 her biopic in Marathi was released named Mee Sindhutai Sapkal
- She also has multiple operating organisations in Maharashtra.

== Baba Amte ==
Baba Amte was known particularly for his work for the rehabilitation and empowerment of poor people suffering from leprosy. Recipient of various accolades, Amte was conferred Ramon Magsaysay Award in 1985 for public service.

== Anna Hazare ==
Anna Hazare is an Indian social activist who led movements to promote rural development, increase government transparency, and investigate and punish corruption in public life. In addition to organising and encouraging grassroots movements, Hazare frequently conducted hunger strikes to further his causes.

Hazare also contributed to the development and structuring of Ralegan Siddhi, a village in Parner taluka of Ahmednagar district, Maharashtra.

Hazare and the youth group decided to take up the issue of alcoholism to drive a process of reform. At a meeting conducted in the temple, the villagers resolved to close down liquor dens and ban alcohol in the village. Since these resolutions were made in the temple, they became, in a sense, religious commitments. Over thirty liquor brewing units voluntarily closed their establishments. Those who did not succumb to social pressure were forced to close their businesses when the youth group smashed their premises. The owners could not complain as their businesses were illegal.

Hazare appealed to the government of Maharashtra to pass a law whereby prohibition would come into force in a village if 25% of the women in the village demanded it. In 2009 the state government amended the Bombay Prohibition Act, 1949 to reflect this.

The social barriers and discrimination that existed due to the caste system in India have been largely eliminated by Ralegan Siddhi villagers. It was Hazare's moral leadership that motivated and inspired the villagers to shun untouchability and caste discrimination. Marriages of Dalits are held as part of community marriage program together with those of other castes. The Dalits have become integrated into the social and economic life of the village. The upper caste villagers built houses for the lower caste Dalits by shramdaan and helped to repay their loans.

== Abhay and Rani Bang ==
Dr. Abhay Bang and Dr. Rani Bang are social activists, researchers working in the field of community health in Gadchiroli district of Maharashtra. They have revolutionized healthcare for the poorest people in India and have overseen a programme that has substantially reduced Infant mortality rates in one of the most poverty-stricken areas in the world. The WHO (World Health Organization) and UNICEF have endorsed their approach to treating newborn babies and the programme is currently being rolled out to parts of Africa. The Bangs founded Society For Education, Action and Research in Community Health (SEARCH) – a non-profit organisation, which is involved in rural health service and research. The Bang couple is the winner of the prestigious Maharashtra Bhushan Award. They have many published articles in The Lancet, one of the world's most prestigious medical journals.

== Prakash Amte ==
Prakash Amte is a medical doctor and social worker from Maharashtra. Son of Magsaysay awardee Baba Amte, he and his wife, Dr. Mandakini Amte were awarded the Magsaysay Award for 'Community Leadership' in 2008 for their philanthropic work in the form of the Lok Biradari Prakalp amongst the Madia Gonds in Gadchiroli district of Maharashtra and the neighbouring states of Andhra Pradesh and Madhya Pradesh.

== Other ==
- Savitribai Phule - founded the first women's school at Bhide Wada in Pune in 1848.
- Pandurang Sadashiv Sane – Sane Guruji – freedom fighter, revolutionary and socialist leader
- Nirmala Deshpande – joined Vinoba Bhave's Bhoodan movement in 1952. She undertook a 40,000-km journey on foot --padayatra—across India to carry Gandhi's message of Grām Swarāj, she also received the Sitara-i-Imtiaz, one of Pakistan's third highest civilian honours, on 13 August 2009
- Narendra Dabholkar – Activist known for his role in Akhil Bharatiya Andhashraddha Nirmulan Samiti (ABANS)
- Sindhutai Sapkal – founded orphanages for street children.
- Gopal Hari Deshmukh – Writer and social reformer best known for his Lokhitwadinchi Shatapatre
- Gopal Ganesh Agarkar – Social thinker from Pune. One-time associate of Lokmanya Bal Gangadhar Tilak.
- Vivek Velankar – RTI activist from Pune.
- Purushottam Kakodkar - He took part in the Civil Disobedience Movement launched by Ram Manohar Lohia in Goa in 1946.
- Sharad Anantrao Joshi - Founder of Swatantra Bharat Paksh party and Shetkari Sanghatana (farmers' Organisation).
- Shahu of Kolhapur -

King of Kolhapur state credited to many social reforms and establishing many educational institutions.

- Shivrampant Damle – educationist

== See also ==
- List of Marathi people in sports
- List of Marathi people in literature and journalism
- List of Marathi people in science, engineering and technology
- List of Marathi people in the performing arts
