= Yashavant Kanetkar =

Indian computer scientist

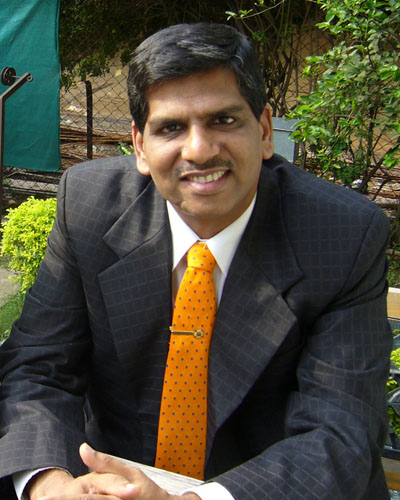
- Education: (B.E.) VJTI (MTech) IIT Kanpur
- Writing career
- Genre: Non-fiction
- Subject: Computer science

Yashavant Kanetkar is an Indian computer scientist and author, who is known for his books on programming languages. He has authored several books on C, C++, VC++, C#, .NET, DirectX and COM programming. He is also a speaker on various technology subjects and is a regular columnist for Express Computers and Developer 2.0. His best-known books include Let Us C, Understanding Pointers In C and Test Your C Skills.

He received the Microsoft Most Valuable Professional award for his work in programming from Microsoft for five consecutive years.

He obtained his B.E. from Veermata Jijabai Technological Institute and M.Tech from IIT Kanpur. He is the director of KICIT, a training company, and KSET. Both these companies are based in Nagpur.

== Brief history ==
Yashavant originally specialized in mechanical engineering. He came to Delhi with the intention of starting a manufacturing business of making VIP suitcase locks. However, he was unable to receive a business loan from any banks. A bank manager told him about a computer scheme that the government had launched. For the benefits of the scheme, Yashavant decided to start a business in IT.

== Yashavant Kanetkar and Computer Science ==
Yashavant has been programming since the days of a single Floppy drive with a 4.77 MHz microprocessor and 256 KB of storage. Ever since then, he has been programming and writing books on programming.

== Bibliography (of selected books) ==
- ASP.NET Web Services (ISBN 978-1934015254)
- Understanding Pointers in C (ISBN 9789388176378)
- C Column Collection (ISBN 978-8176565370)
- C Pearls (ISBN 978-8170298595)
- C Projects (ISBN 978-8170292562)
- C#.NET Fundas (ISBN 978-8176565806)
- C++.Net Fundas (ISBN 978-8176565806)
- C++. Net (ISBN 978-9812140586)
- Data Structure Through C (ISBN 978-8176567060)
- Data Structure Through C++ (ISBN 978-8176567077)
- Direct X Game Programming Fundas (ISBN 978-8176565820)
- Exploring C (ISBN 978-8176566339)
- Go Embedded (ISBN 978-8183332538)
- Graphics Under C (ISBN 978-8170299936)
- Introduction To OOPS & C++ (ISBN 978-8176568630)
- Interview Questions in C Programming
- Interview Questions in C++ Programming
- Java Servlets JSP (ISBN 978-8176565813)
- Let Us C Solutions - 9th Ed. (ISBN 978-1934015339)
- Let Us C++ (ISBN 8176561061, ISBN 978-81-7656-106-8)
- Let Us Python - 2nd Ed. (ISBN 9389845009, ISBN 978-9389845006)
- Object Oriented Programming with C++ (ISBN 978-8176568579)
- Programming Experience in BASIC (ISBN 978-8176566360)
- Test Your C Skill - 2nd Ed. (ISBN 978-8170298014)
- Test Your C++ Skill (ISBN 978-8176565547)
- Test Your C#.NET Skills: Language Elements Pt. 1 (ISBN 978-8183332552)
- Test Your Unix Skill (ISBN 978-8170298489)
- Test Your VB.NET Skills- Part II- Technology Skills (ISBN 8183331378)
- Understanding Pointers in C - 4th Ed. (ISBN 978-8176563581)
- Undocumented DOS Through C (ISBN 978-8170295198)
- Unix Shell Programming (ISBN 978-8170297536)
- VC++ Gems (ISBN 978-8176565523)
- VC++, COM And Beyond (ISBN 978-8176562065)
- Visual C++ Programming (ISBN 978-8170299714)
- Visual C++ Projects (ISBN 978-8176560634)
- Working With C (For DOE - A & B Level) (ISBN 978-8170293019)
- Writing TSR's Through C (ISBN 978-8170295204)
- Writing Windows Device Drivers
- BPB Let US C (Hindi)
- Let Us C# (Covers C# 3.0)
- XML Fundas (ISBN 978-8176565837)
- Let Us Java (ISBN 978-8183334679)
