= List of Marathi people in the performing arts =

== Cinema and theatre ==
Film directors

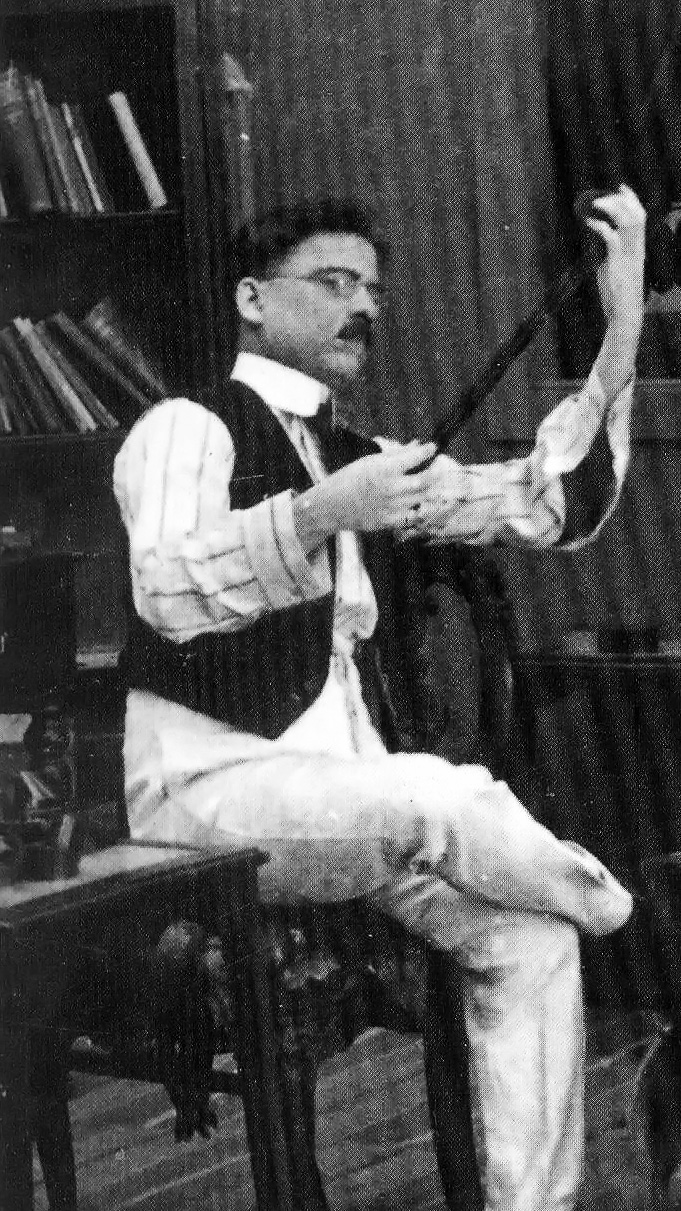
Producer-Director-Screenwriter Dadasaheb Phalke known as The Father of Indian cinema

- Abhinay Deo – film director
- Amol Palekar – Bollywood director & actor, received award for best actor of 1979 for film "Gol Maal"
- Amol Gupte – Bollywood director & actor, received award for best screen play for film "Taare Zameen Par"
- Anand Patwardhan – documentary filmmaker, known for his activism through social action documentaries on topics such as corruption, slum dwellers, etc.
- Ashutosh Gowarikar – director of Lagaan (nominated for Oscars, has bagged 5 filmfare, 7 international awards)
- Baburao Mistry – Wrote his own screenplays; first Indian filmmaker to adopt the method of "Stenographic", the method Satyajit Ray adopted for Pather Panchali
- Bhagwan Dada – film director, producer and actor
- Bhalji Pendharkar – director, was associated with Prabhat Film Company, also received Dadasahab Phalke Award
- Dadasaheb Phalke – directed the first Indian feature film, the "father of Indian cinema"; directed 95 movies and 26 short films in a span of 19 years
- Dadasaheb Torne- made first Indian film named Shree Pundlik in the year 1912
- Deepak Kadam – Director of various Video Albums, Ad films, TV serials & Marathi Feature Films. His upcoming movie WAAKYA has been chosen from 280 films from 35 country for navi Mumbai international film festival-2014
- Dinkar D patil – had an illustrious career as a filmmaker for almost five decades; introduced Marathi Lavani folk dance in his films
- Gauri Shinde – Bollywood director; made her directional debut through the highly acclaimed English Vinglish
- Jabbar Patel – director, maker of classics films in Marathi, received Nargis Dutt award for best feature film on national integration
- Kavita Lad - Marathi television and theatre actress
- Kunal Deshmukh – Bollywood director
- Madhur Bhandarkar – Bollywood director, Script Writer, producer, also 3 times recipient of national filmfare award for best director
- Mahesh Kothare – Bollywood director
- Mahesh Manjrekar – Bollywood director, actor, screenwriter, producer, has won 2 star awards & 1 national award
- Master Vinayak – Bollywood director

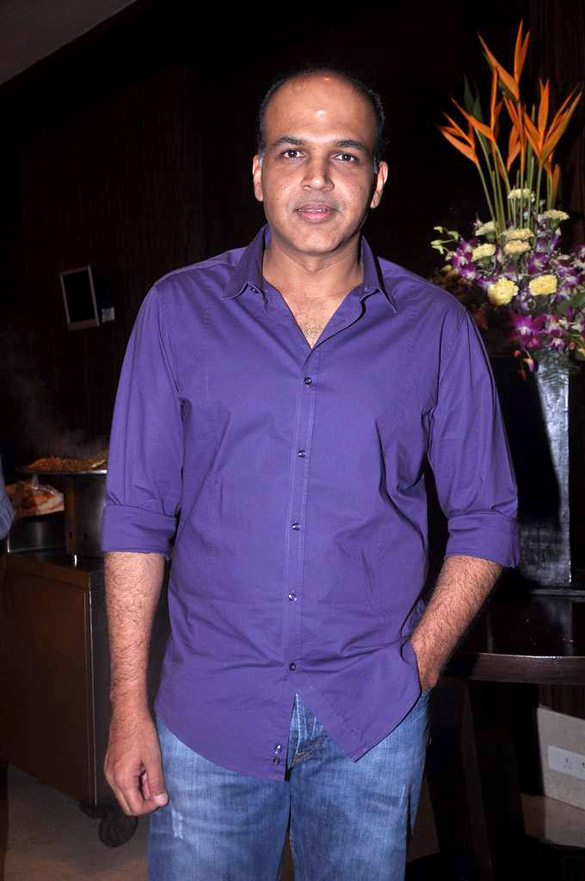
Ashutosh Gowariker directed Lagaan (nominated for Oscars, and has won five Filmfare and seven international awards)

- N. Chandra (Chandrakant Narvekar) – Bollywood director
- Nishikant Kamat – director of movies like Dombivli Fast, Mumbai Meri Jaan and Drishyam
- Paresh Mokashi – his film Harishchandrachi Factory was the Academy Award for Best Foreign Language Film official entry to 82nd Academy Awards in the Best Foreign Language Film
- Acharya Atre – his Marathi film, Shyamchi Aai (श्यामची आई) won the 1954 National Film Award for Best Feature Film, received the First National Film Award
- Prasad Oak – Marathi actor, film director, film producer, poet, singer, writer, singer
- Raja Nawathe-Bollywood director, Regarded as one of the finest female actors in the history of Hindi cinema,
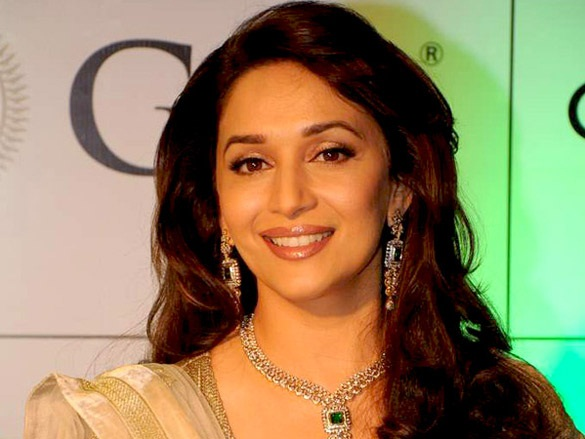
  Madhuri Dixit, a leading actress of Bollywood in the 1980s, 1990s and early-2000s, Dixit has been praised by critics for her acting and dancing skills, and achieved mass popularity due to her beauty.
- Raja Paranjpe – Had a career spanning over 40 years, also was associated with about 80 Marathi film and Hindi film
- Sachin Pilgaonkar – Actor and director, started acting in films at the age of 4, directed several films & TV Soaps
- Sachin Kundalkar – Bollywood director, is a Marathi film director and screenplay writer, received the Best Screenplay for his film Gandha in 2009
- Sai Paranjpe – Director, scriptwriter & theatre personality, received Padma Bhushan in 2006
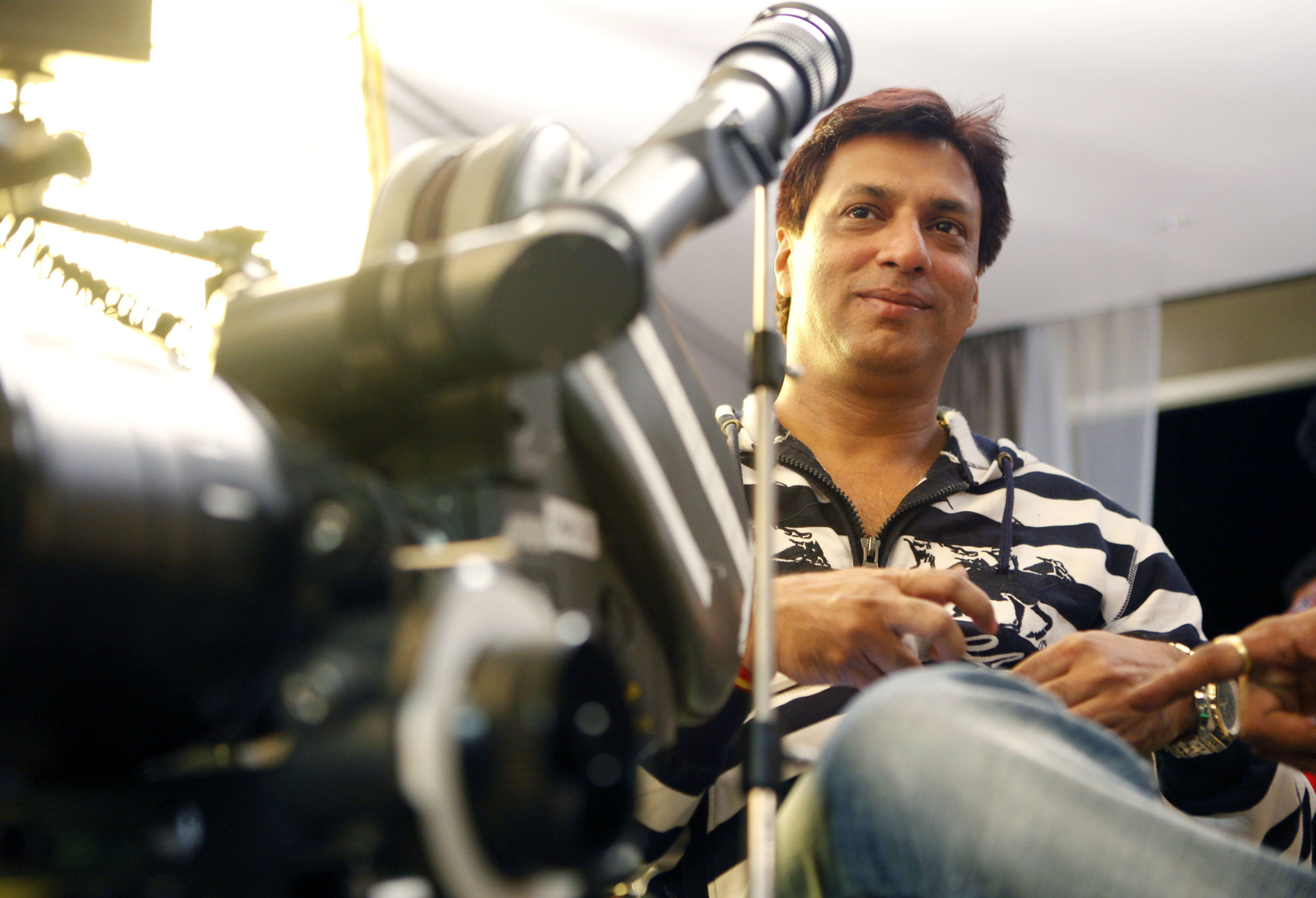
  Madhur Bhandarkar - film director, script writer, and producer
- Umesh Vinayak Kulkarni – Famous director of acclaimed Marathi films like Deool, Vihir and Valu
- V Shantaram – Bollywood director, He directed his first film, "Netaji Palkar" in 1927. In 1929, he founded the Prabhat Film Company
- Vishnupant Damle – Was a set designer, film director of Marathi Cinema, was also one of the co-founders for Prabhat Film Company
- Vishram Sawant – Bollywood director

Film actresses

- Aditi Sarangdhar – Marathi actor known as Angry Young Woman
- Amruta Khanvilkar – Marathi actress and dancer who also appeared in Bollywood films
- Antara Mali – Bollywood actress
- Ashwini Bhave – Bollywood actress
- Bhagyashree Patwardhan – Bollywood actress, known for Maine Pyaar Kiya (1989)
- Bhargavi Chirmule – Marathi actress; worked in movies like Kass and One room kitchen
- Durga Khote – actress; marks the pioneering phase for women in Indian cinema; India Today named her among "100 people who shaped India"
- Durgabai Kamat (1899–1997), first actress of Indian cinema, in Mohini Bhasmasur (1913), second movie of Phalke
- Gauri Pradhan Tejwani – television actress
- Jayshree Gadkar – acted in several Marathi films, also acted in Ramanand Sagar's TV Series Ramayana as Kaushalya, mother of Rama
- Kajal Kiran - Bollywood actress of 70s
- Kavita Lad - Actress
- Kimi Katkar – Bollywood Actress
- Kishori Shahane – Film and television actress
- Lalita Pawar-Noted actress in Indian cinema
- Leela Chitnis – First Indian Film Star to endorse popular soap brand "LUX", concession then only granted to top Hollywood heroines
- Madhuri Dixit – Leading actress in Indian cinema in the 90s, Forbes named her among "Top 5 most powerful Indian Movie Stars"
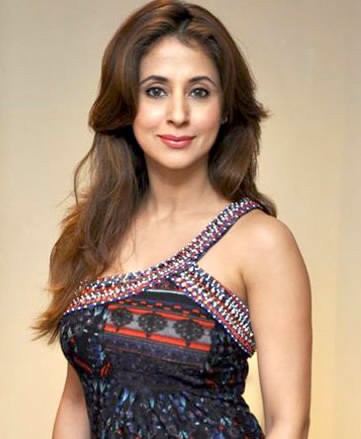
  Urmila Matondkar
- Mamta Kulkarni – Bollywood Actress
- Manjari Phadnis – Actress
- Mayuri Kango – Bollywood actress
- Kajol - Bollywood actress
- Mrinal Kulkarni – Model & Actress
- Mugdha Godse – Model & Actress
- Namrata Shirodkar – Bollywood Actress
- Nanda – actress
- Nivedita Joshi – Actress
- Nutan – Bollywood Actress (Tanuja's elder sister and shobhana samarth's daughter), role model for many Bollywood Heroines, received Padma Shri in 1974
- Padmini Kolhapure – Bollywood actress
- Pallavi Joshi – Bollywood actress
- Prarthana Behere – Television and film actress
- Priya Bapat- Leading Marathi Actress
- Priya Tendulkar – Bollywood Actress, Social Activist, her father was eminent popular writer Vijay Tendulkar
- Radhika Apte – actress
- Ranjana Deshmukh – popular Marathi actress
- Reema Lagoo – acted in various Marathi dramas, Marathi movies, and Bollywood
- Renuka Shahane – Bollywood actress
- Sulochana – actress, received the "Dadasaheb Phalke Award" in 1973
- Sagarika Ghatge – actress
- Sai Tamhankar – Marathi actress
- Sandhya – appeared in popular films like Navrang, Do Aankhen Barah Haath and Jhanak Jhanak Payal Baaje
- Sarika – actress, worked in more than 50 Hindi films, married to Kamal Hasan (Tamil superstar)
- Shakuntala Paranjpye – actress
- Shashikala Jawalkar – Bollywood actress who performed character roles in the 60s and 70s
- Sheetal Agashe – Former film and television actress
- Shilpa Shirodkar – Bollywood actress
- Shilpa Tulaskar – Television actress
- Shobhana Samarth – actress and mother of Nutan and Tanuja
- Shraddha Kapoor – Bollywood actress
- Smita Patil – Bollywood actress nominated for several Filmfare and national awards, received Padma Shri in 1985
- Sonali Bendre – Bollywood actress; acted in Hindi, Marathi, Tamil, Telugu, and Kannada films; received star screen best actress award in 2004
- Sonali Kulkarni – Bollywood actress
- Sonalee Kulkarni – Marathi actress
- Supriya Pilgaonkar – actress
- Tanuja – Bollywood actress
- Tejashri Pradhan – Marathi and Bollywood actress
- Urmila Matondkar – Bollywood actress, started acting from the age of 9 and has acted in several Hindi, Telugu films
- Vandana Gupte – stage and television actress
- Varsha Usgaonkar – Bollywood actress
- Vidya Malvade - Bollywood actress
- Zeenat Aman – Bollywood actress

Beauty queens and supermodels

- Aditi Govitrikar – model
- Anusha Dandekar- MTV VJ and model
- Madhu Sapre – former supermodel
- Mugdha Godse – Bollywood actress
- Pooja Chitgopekar- Miss India Earth 2007 and later Miss Earth Air 2007
- Rakhi Sawant – model and actress
- Ujjwala Raut – international ramp model

Film actors

- Ajinkya Dev – Bollywood actor
- Ashok Saraf – leading Marathi actor
- Atul Kulkarni – Bollywood actor; theatre artist; acted in several Marathi, Hindi, and Kannada films; nominated for Asia Pacific Screen Award for Best Actor for Marathi film Natarang
- Bhanu Athaiya – costume designer, recipient of Oscar for her work on the movie Gandhi
- Bharat Jadhav – leading Marathi theatre performer
- Dada Kondke – revolutionised Marathi comedy
- David Abraham Cheulkar – Jewish Bollywood character actor of the 60s
- Dilip Prabhavalkar – leading stage artist. Last seen as Gandhi in Lage Raho Munnabhai
- Kanan Kaushal
- Kashinath Ghanekar - veteran stage actor
- Kuldeep Pawar – actor
- Laxmikant Berde – leading Marathi actor of 80s and 90s
- Milind Soman – model and actor
- Mohan Agashe – leading art film and Bollywood actor
- Mohan Gokhale (1953–1999) – Mr. Yogi

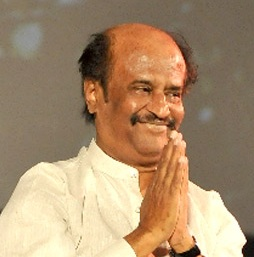
"Superstar" Rajinikanth

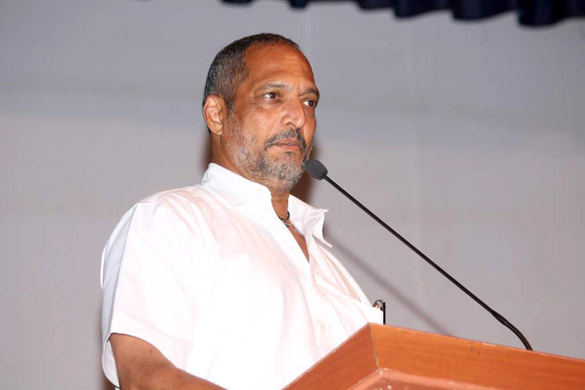
Nana Patekar

- Nana Patekar – Bollywood and leading stage actor
- Omi Vaidya – Bollywood actor
- Rajnikant – Tamil/South Indian cinema superstar and second highest paid Asian actor as of 2017
- Ramesh Bhatkar – actor
- Rakesh Bapat – Bollywood actor, also holds the title of Grasim Mr. India
- Ritesh Deshmukh – Bollywood actor
- Sachin Pilgaonkar - film and television actor, director, singer and producer. Winner of four Filmfare Awards
- Sachin Khedekar – Bollywood actor movies Subhas Chandra Bose, Astitva
- Sadashiv Amrapurkar – Bollywood and Marathi film actor
- Sanjay Narvekar- Marathi and Bollywood actor
- Sayaji Shinde – Marathi, Bollywood, Tollywood actor & film producer
- Shivaji Satam – actor
- Shreyas Talpade – Bollywood actor
- Shriram Lagoo - Marathi and Bollywood actor
- Sudhir Joshi – late Marathi actor, acted in several Marathi films
- Swanand Kirkire – Bollywood lyricist
- Vijayendra Ghatge – Bollywood actor
- Viju Khote – Bollywood actor
- Vikram Gokhale – actor

== Indian classical musicians ==
- Ajay Pohankar – classical vocalist
- Ajay–Atul – music composer brothers (Natrang)
- Arati Ankalikar-Tikekar – classical singer
- Arun Paudwal – music director of Marathi cinema
- Ashwini Bhide – classical Vocalist
- Bal Gandharva (1888–1967) singer and stage actor
- Bhimsen Joshi (1922–2011) - Indian vocalist in the Hindustani classical tradition, recipient of the Bharat Ratna

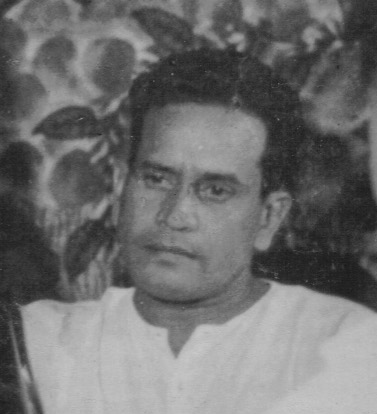
Bhimsen Joshi

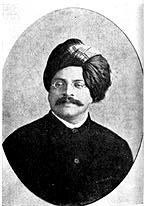
Vishnu Digambar Paluskar sang the original version of the bhajan "Raghupati Raghava Raja Ram", and founded the Gandharva Mahavidyalaya in 1901.

- C. R. Vyas (1924–2002)- Indian vocalist in the Hindustani classical tradition, recipient of the Padma Bhushan
- C. Ramchandra (or Ramchandra Chitalkar) (1918–1977) – Hindi film music director
- Datta Naik – Hindi film music director
- Hirabai Barodekar (1905–1989) – Indian Hindustāni classical music singer, pioneer of concerts by women artists in India, from the Kirana Gharana
- Hridaynath Mangeshkar – music director
- Jyotsna Bhole – singer, actor
- Kesarbai Kerkar – singer, born at Keri in Goa
- Kishori Amonkar (born 1931) – classical singer
- Laxmikant Kudalkar (1937–1998) – of the duo Laxmikant-Pyarelal
- Mogubai Kurdikar – singer from Jaipur Gharana born at Kurdi Goa.
- Prabha Atre (born 1932) - Indian classical vocalist; awarded Padmabhushan, Sangeet Natak Akademi award
- Ram Kadam (1916–1997) – Marathi music composer (Pinjra 1972, Sangte Aika 1959)
- Sameep Kulkarni - Sitarist
- Sanjeev Abhyankar – classical singer
- Satish Vyas – Santoor player, recipient of the Padma Shri
- Shrikrishna Narayan Ratanjankar (1899–1974) – Indian classical musicologist, Vocalist, composer, Padmabhushan 1957
- Shrinivas Khale - music director
- Shruti Sadolikar-Katkar
- Sudhir Phadke (1919–2002) – Marathi music composer, composed music for Geet Ramayan
- Sureshbabu Mane – vocalist of Kirana gharana
- Uday Bhawalkar – Dhrupad vocalist
- Ulhas Kashalkar – Hindustani Classical Vocalist
- V. G. Jog – violinist
- Vasant Desai – music director of Hindi/Marathi films
- Vasantrao Deshpande – classical singer
- Veena Sahasrabuddhe – classical vocalist
- Vidyadhar Oke - harmonium player, musicologist, musical instrument inventor
- Vishnu Digambar Paluskar – singer of gwalior gharana, reformer of Indian Classical Music
- Vishnu Narayan Bhatkhande (10 August 1860 – 19 September 1936) – Indian classical musicologist and reformer

== Singers ==
- Aarya Ambekar – singer
- Abhijeet Sawant – singer
- Anupama Deshpande – playback singer
- Anuradha Paudwal - singer
- Arun Date – singer
- Asha Bhosle – playback singer
- Bela Shende – playback singer
- Devaki Pandit – singer
- Hema Sardesai- Bollywood playback singer
- Hridaynath Mangeshkar – playback singer, was awarded Padmashri by Government of India in 2009
- Kaushal Inamdar – music composer, director
- Lata Mangeshkar – one of the most prominent female playback artists of Indian cinema; music composer; first Indian singer to enter the Guinness Book of World Records for having made most recordings in the world (1974–1991)

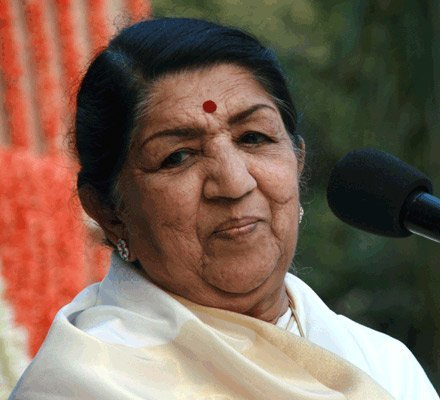
Lata Mangeshkar

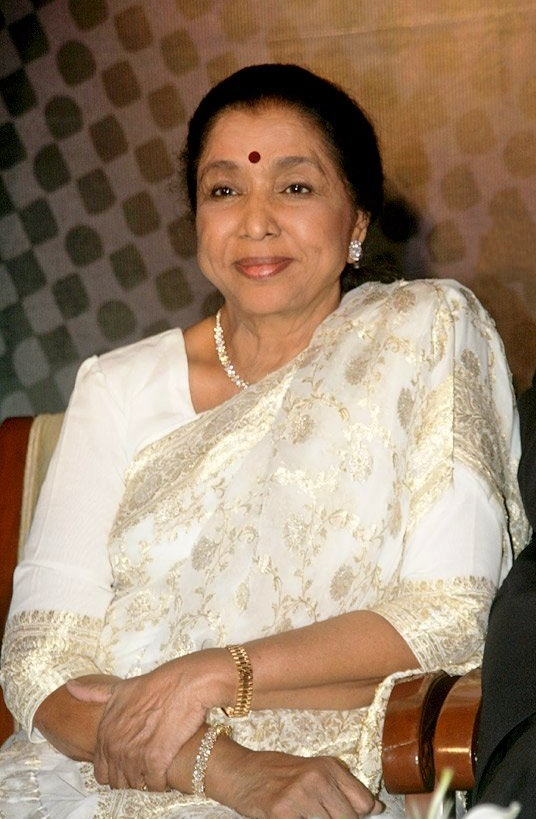
Asha Bhosle

- Manik Varma – Classical singer, awarded Padma Shri in 1974
- Meena Mangeshkar – playback singer
- Milind Ingle – Marathi and Hindi music composer and singer
- Nihira Joshi – singer
- Prajakta Shukre – singer
- Rahul Vaidya – singer
- Sadhana Sargam – Bollywood playback singer
- Sandeep Khare – poet and singer
- Saleel Kulkarni - singer, musician, author, director
- Sanjivani - singer
- Shalmali Kholgade – singer
- Shridhar Phadke – Marathi music composer and singer, son of Sudhir Phadke
- Sudesh Bhosle - Bollywood playback singer
- Sudhir Phadke (25 July 1919, Kolhapur – 29 July 2002) – Marathi music composer and singer
- Suresh Wadkar – playback singer
- Usha Mangeshkar – singer
- Vaishali Samant – singer

=== Modern music ===
- Avdhoot Gupte – music composer, singer
- Gaurav Dagaonkar – music composer, also does pock, Pop, as music director his first release Lanka
- Karsh Kale – New Age musician, fusion, electronica from US
- Mandar Agashe – music director and businessman
- Milind Date – flautist, composer, Known for his collaborations with many international artists and flamboyant performances
- Salil Kulkarni – music composer, singer (Aggobai Dhaggobai)
- Sandip Khare – poet, songwriter and singer (Ayushyawar bolu kahi, Diwas Ase Ki)

== Applied arts - fashion, photography, art direction, advertisement ==
- Atul Kasbekar – first Indian to win the International Food and Beverage Creative Excellence Awards (FAB Awards) 2005, held at London
- Bhanu Athaiya – first Indian to win the Academy Award for Costume Design for the film Gandhi (1982)
- Gautam Rajadhyaksha – one of India's leading fashion photographers
- Gopi Kukde – advertising veteran, prominently recognised for the advertising character of the Onida Devil
- M.V. Dhurandhar – painter and postcard artist
- Nitin Chandrakant Desai – art director, first Indian to receive the Genie Award for his film Such a Long Journey
- Pralhad Anant Dhond – later a teacher; in 1958 became the Dean of Sir. J. J. School of Art
- Ram V. Sutar – sculptor; his first work of note was the 45 feet Chambal monument at the Gandhi Sagar Dam, in Madhya Pradesh; received Padmashri in 1999
- Sambhaji Kadam – painter; also studied musicology, especially the "Shruti" intervals or the micro-tonic intervals in Indian music
- V. S. Gaitonde – painter, received First prize at the Young Asian Artists Exhibition, Rockefeller Fellowship and Padma Shri in 1971

== Historians ==
- Anant Sadashiv Altekar – in 1947, elected the First Chairman of the Numismatic Society of India
- Annabhau Sathe –a founder member of the Lal Bawta Kalapathak of the Communist Party in Maharashtra; people conferred the epithet Lok Shahir
- Babasaheb Purandare – historian who researched Shivajij
- Devadatta Ramakrishna Bhandarkar - archaeologist and epigraphist; Carmichael Professor of Ancient Indian History and Culture in the University of Calcutta
- Dattatraya Ganesh Godse – historian, playwright, art critic; received a Sangeet Natak Akademi Award in 1988
- Datto Vaman Potdar – due to vast knowledge he was called as Dr. Johnson of Maharashtra or a living encyclopaedia; the Government of India honoured Potdar with the title Mahamahopadhyaya (महामहोपाध्याय) in 1946, and Padma bhushan in 1967
- Govind Sakharam Sardesai – historian and writer
- Ninad Bedekar – historian and writer

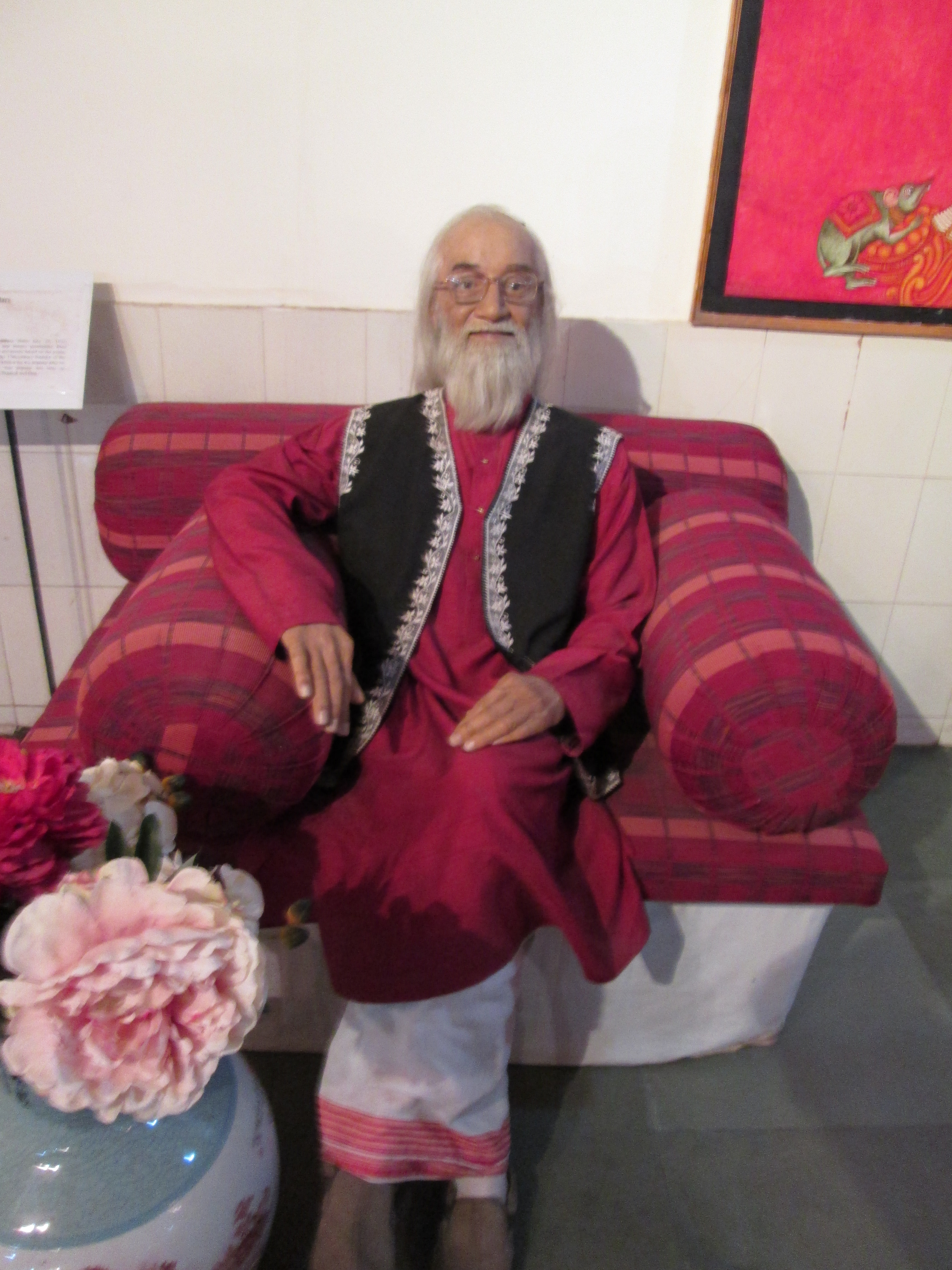
Babasaheb Purandare wax statue at Wax Museum, Lonavala

- Shridhar Venkatesh Ketkar – His doctoral thesis was later published as The History of Caste in India (volume 1), which determines the date of Manusmriti
- Tryambak Shankar Shejwalkar, was the first historian to study the Third Battle of Panipat
- Vasudev Vishnu Mirashi – For his vital contribution to the Indian history he was honoured with the title Mahamahopadhyaya (महामहोपाध्याय) by the British Indian Government in 1941. He was also awarded Padmabhushan in 1975 by the President of India.
- Vishnushastri Krushnashastri Chiplunkar – His articles introduced reader to "Western" tradition of literacy criticism
- Vishwanath Kashinath Rajwade – He was considered to be the first in real sense to undertake an immense research of Maratha history
- Vishwas Patil – "Panipatkar", recipient of Bhartiya Parishad Award, Gadkari Award & several other prestigious awards
- Vithal Krishnaji Khedkar – Was one of the founders of Prarthana Samaj in Bombay & original author of a book later published The Divine Heritage of the Yadavas
- Appasaheb Pawar - Eminent Maratha Historian and ex-Vice Chancellor of Shivaji University, Kolhapur
- Jaisinghrao Pawar - Acclaimed scholar of Maratha history

== Others ==
- Vishnupant Moreshwar Chatre - Father of Indian circus
- Y. K. Padhye - Founder of modern-day ventriloquism in India

== See also ==
- List of Marathi people in science, engineering and technology
- List of Marathi Social reformers
- List of Marathi People in literature and journalism
- List of Marathi People in sports
