= Mahanagar (newspaper) =

- Type: Daily
- Format: Tabloid
- Founder: Nikhil Wagle
- Publisher: Sanjay Bhaskar Sawant
- Editor: Sanjay Bhaskar Sawant
- Founded: January 1990; 36 years ago
- Language: Marathi, Hindi
- Headquarters: Mumbai
- City: Mumbai
- Country: India
- Website: www.mymahanagar.com

Mahanagar ("Metropolis") is a Marathi and Hindi newspaper published from Mumbai, India. The Marathi version Aapla Mahanagar ("Our metropolis") was founded by Nikhil Wagle in January 1990; the Hindi version Hamara Mahanagar was established in 1982.

Nikhil Wagle was physically attacked by Shiv Sena supporters multiple times for his critical remarks against the party and its leaders.

== See also ==
- List of Marathi-language newspapers
- List of newspapers in India
