= Shamkant Navathe =

Computer scientist

Shamkant B. Navathe
- Education: University of Michigan, Ohio State University, Indian Institute of Science, University of Pune
- Awards: ACM Fellow (2014)
- Scientific career
- Fields: Databases, bioinformatics
- Workplaces: Georgia Tech College of Computing
- Doctoral advisor: Alan G. Merten

Shamkant B. Navathe is a noted researcher in the field of databases with more than 150 publications on different topics in the area of databases.

He is a professor in the College of Computing at Georgia Institute of Technology and founded the Research Group in Database Systems at the College of Computing at Georgia Institute of Technology (popularly called Georgia Tech). He has been at Georgia Tech since 1990. He has been teaching in the database area since 1975 and his textbook Fundamentals of Database Systems (with Ramez Elmasri, published by Pearson, Seventh Edition, 2015) has been a leading textbook in the database area worldwide for the last 19 years. It is now in its seventh edition and is used as a standard textbook in India, Europe, South America, Australia and South-east Asia. The book has been translated into Spanish, German, French, Italian, Portuguese, Chinese, Korean, Greek, and in Arabic. His research is in the area of bioinformatics. Navathe is working in advisory roles with Indian companies like Tata Consultancy Services (TCS), and Persistent Systems. He is also consultant for companies in information systems and software products design area and is an independent director of GTL Limited, a Mumbai-based telecommunications company.

== Education ==
Navathe completed his S.S.C. from Modern High School, Pune in 1961 and F.Y.Bsc (Inter Science) in 1963 and at B.Sc. (Physics) in 1965. He obtained his B.E. degree in Electrical Communications Engineering at the Indian Institute of Science, where he was a gold medalist. Navathe came to the U.S. in fall of 1969. He was working as a system engineer for IBM and Electronic Data Systems in Calcutta when he left India. He received an M.S. degree in Computer and Information Science in 1970 from Ohio State University. He then received a Ph.D. from University of Michigan Industrial and Operations Engineering in 1976. His doctoral thesis was on "A Methodology for Generalized Database Restructuring".

== Career ==
Navathe taught as an assistant professor in the Computer Applications and Information Systems Department at the Graduate School of Business Administration New York University and at the Computer and Information Sciences Department at University of Florida before joining Georgia Institute of Technology in 1990. He has been a professor at the College of Computing at Georgia Tech since 1990 and is a faculty Member in the Bioengineering, Bioinformatics and the Health Sciences Institute programs at Georgia Tech.

He was the program co-chair at the 1985 ACM Annual Conference of the Special Interest Group on Management of Data, Austin, Texas, and also at the PARBASE 1990 First International Conference on Databases, Parallel Architectures and their Applications, Miami, Florida, March 6–9, 1990, IEEE Computer Society. He was the general chairman at the IFIP WG 2.6 Working Conference on Database Application Semantics (DS-6), Stone Mountain, Georgia, May 31-June 2. He was the conference chair at VLDB 1996 Very Large Database Conference, Mumbai, India, September 3–6, 1996.

He has been a member of international steering committees like PDIS (Parallel and Distributed Information Systems) International Conference (est 1991), Conceptual Modeling (Object Oriented and ER modeling) International Conference (est 1993), International Federation on Cooperative Information Systems (IFCIS), (est 1994), IPIC (Information and Process Integration in enterprises Conference) (est 1996).

He has been the associate editor of ACM Computing Surveys, September 1986 – December 1997, IEEE Transactions on Knowledge and Data Engineering, Sept. '94. – Dec. '98, Data and Knowledge Engineering, a North Holland Elsevier Journal, (since June 1985), Journal of Data Semantics (since 2005).

He has also been a member of editorial board for Information Systems, a journal published by Pergamon Press], since 1987, Parallel and Distributed Database Systems, a journal published by Kluwer Academic Press, (since 1992), Information Technology and Management, a journal by Chapman and Hall, (since 1999), The World Wide Web Journal, Kluwer Academic Press, (since 2001)

He is the editor of the series on "Database Systems and Applications," Benjamin Cummings Publishing Co., Redwood City, California (est 1985), and the Series on Emerging Directions in Database Systems and Applications, CRC Press; which was launched in 2008.

== Awards ==
Navathe was elected to fellow of ACM (2014) for contributions to database modeling, data design, and database education.

== Bibliography ==
Books written by Navathe:

- Elmasri, R.; Navathe, S.B. (2010). Fundamentals of Database Systems, Sixth Edition. Pearson. pp. 1200 pp.
- Bussler, C.; Castellanos, M.; Navathe, S.B. (2007). Business Intelligence for the Real-Time Enterprises, First International Workshop BIRTE 2006. Seoul, Korea: Springer LNCS 4365. pp. 156pp.
- Elmasri, R.; Navathe, S.B. (2007). Fundamentals of Database Systems, Fifth Edition. Addison Wesley. pp. 1040 pp.
- Elmasri, R.; Navathe, S.B. (2004). Fundamentals of Database Systems, Fourth Edition. Addison Wesley. pp. 1015 pp.
- Elmasri, R.; Navathe, S.B. (2000). Fundamentals of Database Systems, Third Edition. Addison Wesley. pp. 955 pp.(Translated into German, Italian, French, Spanish, Portuguese, Chinese, Greek, Korean)
- Wakayama, T.; Kannapan, S.; Khoong, C.M.; Navathe, S.B.; Yates, Yates (1998). Information and Process Integration in Enterprises: Rethinking Documents. Kluwer Academic Publishers.
- Elmasri, R.; Navathe, S.B. (1994). Fundamentals of Database Systems, Second Edition. Addison Wesley. pp. 873 pp.(Translated into Spanish, Korean, Greek and Chinese in 1997)
- Batini, C.; Ceri, S.; Navathe, S.B. (August 1991). Conceptual Database Design: An Entity Relationship Approach. Benjamin Cummings. pp. 470 pp. ISBN 9780805302448.
- Rishe, N.; Navathe, S.B.; Tal, D. (1991). Databases: Theory, Design and Applications, IEEE Computer Society Press.
- Rishe, N.; Navathe, S.B.; Tal, D. (1991). Parallel Architectures, IEEE Computer Society Press.
- Elmasri, R.; Navathe, S.B. (February 1989). Fundamentals of Database Systems, First Edition. Benjamin Cummings. pp. 802 pp.
