= Nikhil Wagle =

Indian journalist (born 1959)

- Born: 23 April 1959 (age 67); Mumbai, Maharashtra, India
- Occupations: Journalist, author, editor
- Years active: 1977 onwards
- Spouse: Meena Karnik
- Children: 1

Nikhil Wagle (born 23 April 1959) is an Indian journalist, columnist and author from Maharashtra.

== Career ==
=== Print media ===
Nikhil Wagle started his media career in 1977 as a freelance reporter. He later joined Dinank, a Marathi newsweekly, in Mumbai. In 1979, when the editor of Dinank resigned, the publisher asked 19-year-old Wagle to become the managing editor. Wagle later became the editor-in-chief of Dinank. Subsequently, he went to Pune, and joined Kirloskar Group, which owned a couple of magazines at that time. However, within one month, he quit his new job and came back to Mumbai.

In 1982, he started his own publishing house and started a new magazine called Akshar. In 1983, he started a sports magazine Shatkar with Sandeep Patil as editor. In 1985, he started a film magazine Chanderi, which was first edited by Rohini Hattangadi and then by Gautam Rajadhyaksha. He also published some Gujarati language magazines.

In 1990, he established the Marathi and Hindi newspaper Mahanagar. He also served as the editor of the Marathi version of the newspaper (Aapla Mahanagar). He became a noted critic of the political party Shiv Sena and its chief Bal Thackeray. For this reason, his office was attacked by the party's supporters' multiple times, beginning in 1991.

In 1994, he criticized the Maharashtra legislators for paying fawning tributes to a deceased MLA accused of having criminal connections. When he refused to apologize to the legislators for the critical comments, he was imprisoned for a week. In August 2004, the Shiv Sena supporters beat him up and blackened his face with engine oil for being critical of the party leader Narayan Rane (who later joined Indian National Congress).

Wagle also brought out more than 80 books in the capacity of a publisher.

=== Television ===
Wagle's career in television began in 1989. After hosting shows for Doordarshan, he turned to socio-political commentary during which time he worked for various media outlets outside of Doordarshan. He was also the anchor of the talk show Amne Samne.

In the mid-2000s, Wagle joined the Network 18 group where he held the position of Editor in Chief of IBN Lokmat, a Marathi news channel. He also hosted an OpEd show on the channel titled Aajcha Sawal. Wagle would eventually resign his position at IBN Lokmat in July 2014. He received the Sanskriti Award as a member of the IBN Lokmat editorial team.

Soon after leaving IBN Lokmat Wagle joined a new channel Maharashtra One as its Editor in Chief. Several of his coworkers from IBN Lokmat followed him to Maharashtra One. He also revived ``Aajacha Sawal`` at Maharashtra One. In November 2016, he resigned from his position at Maharashtra One.

=== YouTube ===
Since Dec 2022, he runs a YouTube channel named Nikhil Wagle Original, where his videos reacting to current affairs often go viral.

== Attack on Wagle ==
On February 09, 2024, Nikhil Wagle's car was attacked by Bharatiya Janata Party workers with the chants of Jai Shri Ram's slogans for his remarks on Prime Minister Narendra Modi and Lal Krishna Advani.

== Personal ==
Nikhil Wagle is married to Meena Karnik, who is also a journalist and media cell convener of Aam Aadmi Party He is an atheist.
