= Sunil Khandbahale =

Indian businessman (born 1978)

Sunil Shivaji Khandbahale
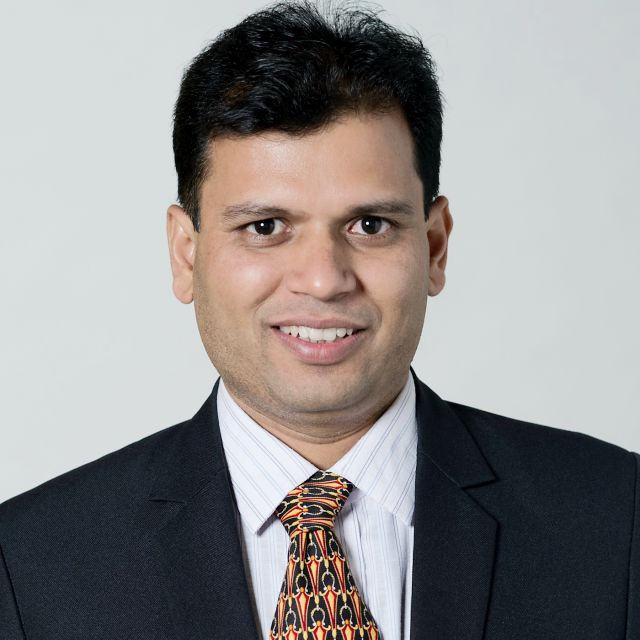
- Khandbahale 2015
- Born: 1 June 1978 (age 48); Nashik, Maharashtra
- Education: Massachusetts Institute of Technology; MIT Sloan School of Management
- Occupations: Founder & CEO, KHANDBAHALE.COM; Founder & CEO, KHANDBAHALE.ORG; Founder & Secretary, Global Prosperity Foundation; Co-Founder & President, Kumbhathon
- Website: sunilkhandbahale.com

Sunil Shivaji Khandbahale (born 1 June 1978) is an innovator and entrepreneur from Nashik, India. He is the founder and CEO of KHANDBAHALE.COM, a free multilingual digital dictionary and translation platform for 23 languages, with a vocabulary of 10 million words and phrases. He is a technology and innovation columnist.

== Early life and education ==
Khandbahale was born in Nashik. He could not afford to enroll at a computer training institute after graduating high school, and so borrowed books and computer from his friend and taught himself programming.

== Career ==
Khandbahale developed a dictionary search engine program for Marathi. He continued compiling dictionaries, and in 2005, set up an online dictionary portal, khandbahale.com, for various Indian languages. He is Sloan Fellow and earned a master's degree in business management MBA degree at MIT Sloan School of Management, Massachusetts Institute of Technology.

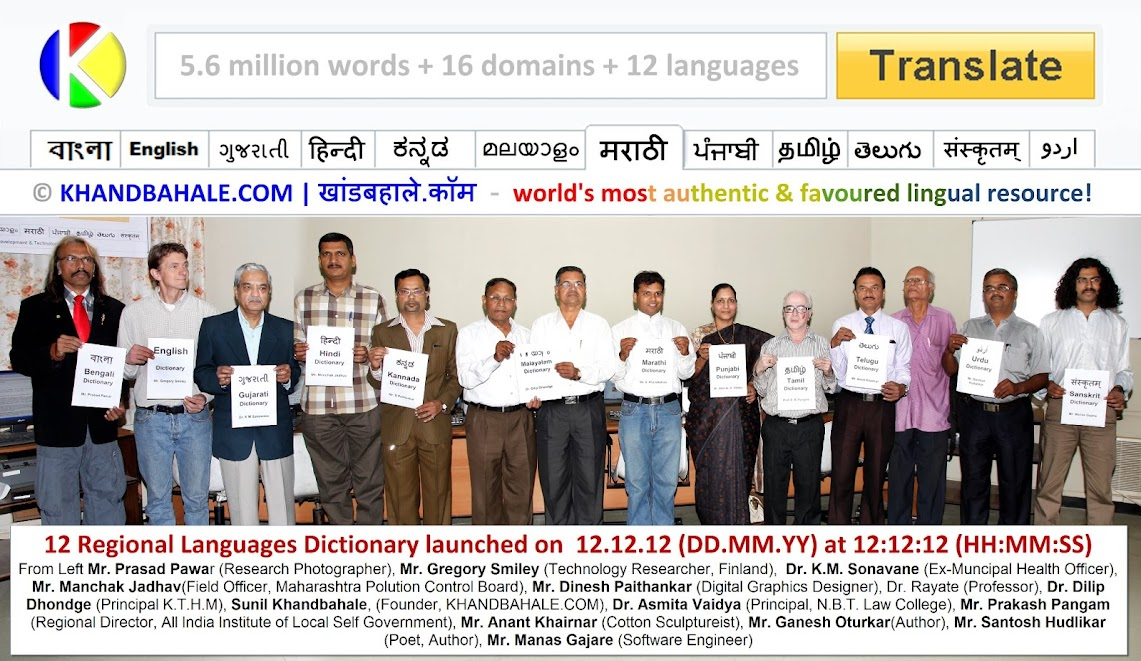
Khandbahale 12 languages dictionary is being launched on 2012-12-12 at 12:12:12

In 2012, he launched 12 Language Dictionary on 12 December 2012 at 12 hours, 12 minutes and 12 seconds. In early 2013 Khandbahale launched his twelve-languages dictionary on an SMS platform. His Languages Apps are also available on the Android platform.

He also founded KHANDBAHALE.ORG, an organization which develops language-related projects such as Global Language Networking, Global Language Heritage, Global Language Friendship, Global Language Environment. He is a founder and secretary of the Global Prosperity Foundation, an NGO that focused on education, health and environment. In 2013 he was given an award as a youth icon by the Maharashtra Times. On 27 December 2013, he co-founded Kumbhathon with MIT Professor Ramesh Raskar, an innovation platform to spot problems and probe solutions in Nashik. In 2014, in conjunction with Mumbai University, he started developing an English to Sanskrit thesaurus for use with mobile phones. He had also developed Marathi language spellchecker software.

== Work ==
During the global pandemic time of COVID-19, he developed a musical therapy technology tool Samaysangit.App as a solution for mental health based on time based Indian classical music raga theory., He was instrumental in Nashik Kumbh Mela 2015 through Kumbhathon.

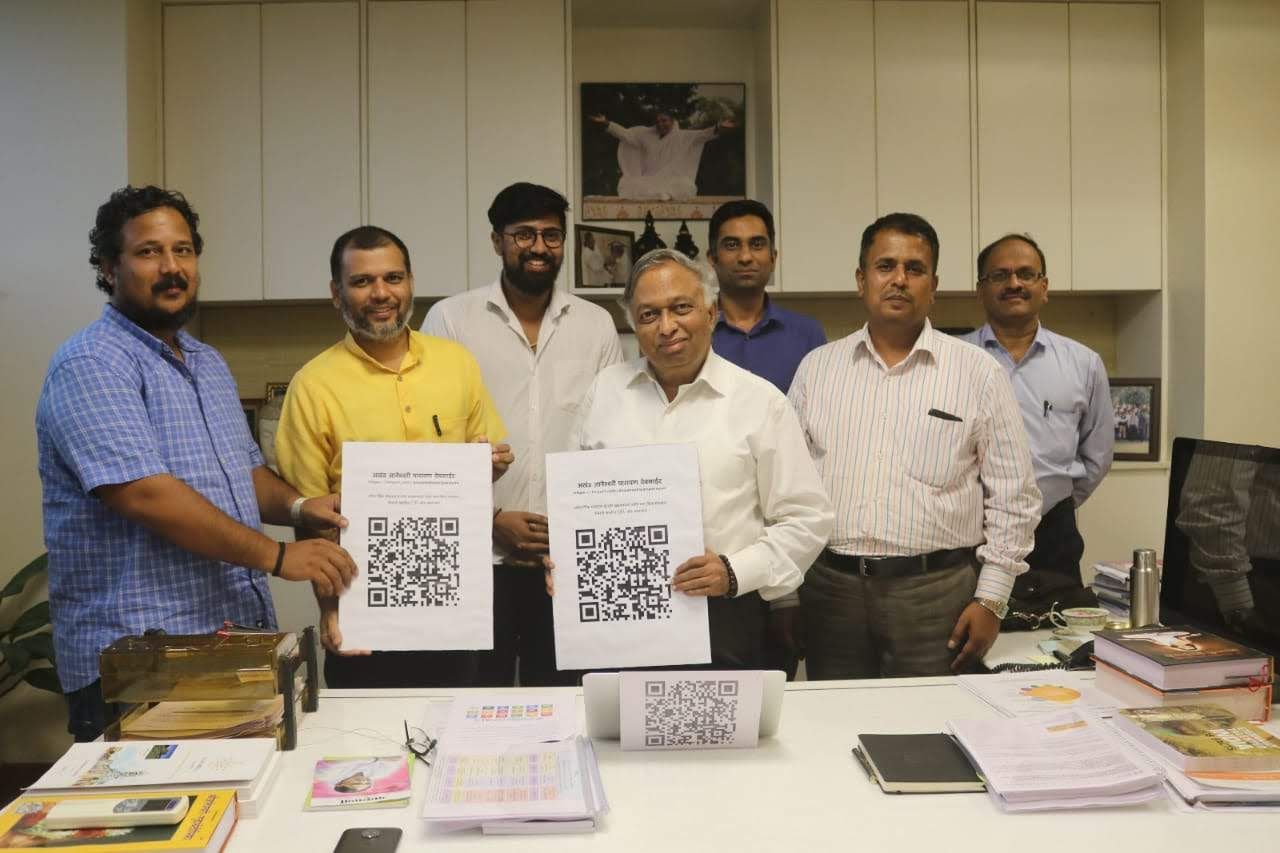
Dnyaneshwari Radio being launched by Vijay Bhatkar, Sunil Khandbahale, Sakhare Maharaj

While he was on his spiritual journey at Alandi (Devachi), Pune, he launched first ever 24x7 (Akhand) Online Dnyaneshwari Radio with the blessings of Shri Kisan Maharaj Sakhare and Vijay P. Bhatkar. As a student of Central Sanskrit University Delhi, he started Sanskritbharati Internet Community Radio as an all time listening platform for the Sanskrit language students. He wrote Godavari Aarti and build a water innovation technology platform titled Godavariaarti.org for global collaboration on water issues.

== Awards ==
- Best entrepreneur of the year "Yashokirti Award", from the Computer Society of India.
- Best Local Language Website Award from the Internet and Mobile Association of India.
- International "Manthan Award" from the United Nations' World Summit on the Information Society.
- "Youth Icon" Award from the Times Group.
- National ICT VASVIK Industrial Research Award.
