= List of Marathi people in sports =

This page is a list of Marathi sportspersons.

== Cricketers ==
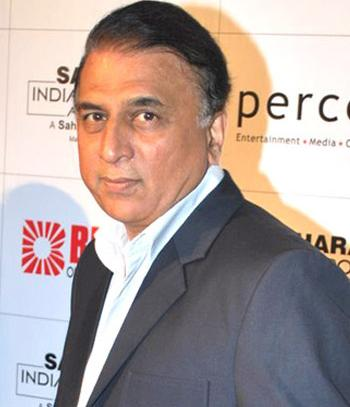
Sunil Gavaskar

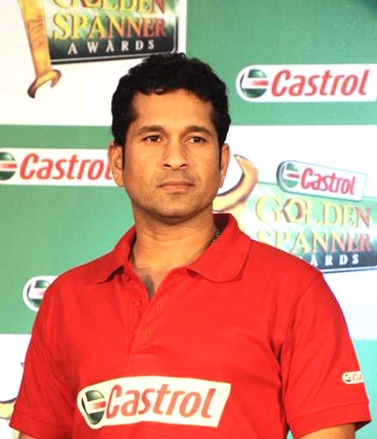
Sachin Tendulkar, First Indian to score 100 Internationals 100's in the game of cricket

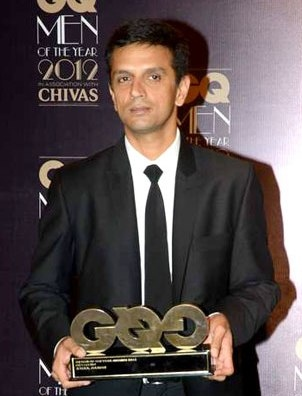
Rahul Dravid, First Indian to have scored 10000 runs at no 3 position

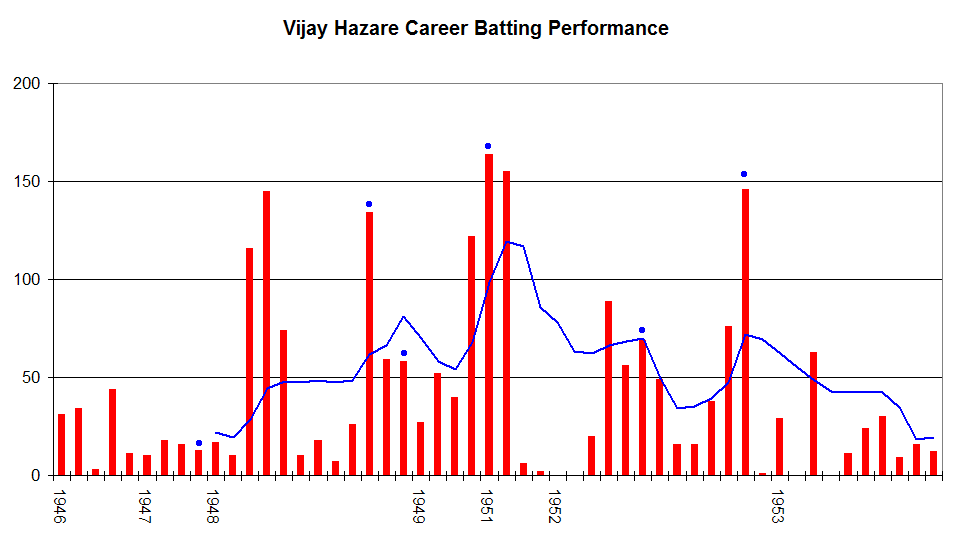
Vijay Hazare, First Indian player to complete 1000 Test Runs

- Aavishkar Salvi – Is an Indian cricketer. He is a right-arm medium-pace bowler and right-handed batsman. In first class cricket, he plays for Mumbai.
- Ajinkya Rahane – Is a right-handed batsman, who represents India, He is one of the only 11 players to have scored more than 1000 runs in a single Ranji Trophy season
- Ajit Agarkar – Has a record of fastest 50 scored, 2nd fastest ODI wickets, has 288 ODI wickets under his belt
- Ajit Wadekar – He was the first Indian captain who lead the team to series victories on tours to the West Indies and in England in 1971.
- Anshuman Gaekwad – He was known for his defensive mindset against pace bowlers, which became a high priority when the West Indian pace bowlers dominated world cricket. He was nicknamed The Great Wall
- Bapu Nadkarni – He bowled 21 maiden overs in succession. The record for most consecutive balls without conceding a run is held by Hugh Tayfield of South Africa
- Baloo Gupte – Was a leg-spinner, made his debut under Nari Contractor in 1960–61 against Pakistan led by Fazal Mahmood
- Chandrakant Pandit – He played in 5 Tests and 36 ODIs from 1986 to 1992. He became a cricket coach, enjoying successful stints with the Mumbai cricket team
- Chandrasekhar Gadkari – He made a fine impression as a fielder in the 1952/53 tour to West Indies in an Indian side that was noted for its fielding
- Chandrakant Patankar – He was a wicketkeeper and lower-order right-handed batsman
- Chandu Borde – He made his debut in the First Test during the West Indies tour of India, received the Arjuna Award, Padma Shri, Padma Bhushan
- Dhawal Kulkarni – Is an Indian first class cricketer, he plays for Mumbai and in the Indian Premier League, he plays for Mumbai Indians
- Dattu Phadkar – Was an all-rounder who represented India in Test cricket
- Dattaram Hindlekar – Toured England in 1936 and 1946 as India's first choice wicket-keeper
- Dilip Sardesai – His important century of 112 in the next Test at Port of Spain led to India's first victory over West Indies
- Dilip Vengsarkar – He was one of the most stylish batsmen of his time, he a nickname 'Colonel', received the Arjuna Award in 1981, Padma Shri honour in 1987
- Eknath Solkar – Renowned for his excellent close fielding, 53 catches in only 27 matches is the best ratio of any non-keeper with 20 or more Tests, responsible for one of cricket's most celebrated quotes, directed at Geoffrey Boycott: I will out you bloody
- Hemu Adhikari – He helped guide India to their first series win in England in 1971
- Hemant Kanitkar – Is an Indian first class cricketer, represented India in Tests in 1974
- Hrishikesh Kanitkar – He scored prolifically for the Maharashtra cricket team in the Ranji Trophy to bring himself into contention for national selection
- Abhijit Kale – prolific domestic run getter, played for India in one day international.
- Kedar Jadhav – He is a right-handed middle-order batsman
- Khandu Rangnekar – Started his first class career in the Bombay Pentangular and scored a hundred in his first appearance in the Ranji Trophy, played for India in 1947–48
- Kiran More – Was the wicket-keeper for the Indian cricket team, he was the Chairman of the Selection Committee of the BCCI
- Lisa Sthalekar – Australian women cricketer of Indian origin
- Manohar Hardikar – Was an Indian Test cricketer, he captained Mumbai in twelve matches, winning five and drawing the rest
- Nilesh Kulkarni – Was only Indian to take a wicket with the very first ball that he bowled in Test cricket, and 12th bowler in the history of the game
- Poonam Raut – Indian women cricketer
- Pravin Amre – Is an Indian cricketer, is the current coach of the Mumbai cricket team
- Ramesh Powar – He played a large role in Mumbai's successful 2002–03 season in the Ranji Trophy
- Rahul Dravid – He is the First Indian to have scored 10000 runs at no 3 position
- Ramnath Parkar – Was an Indian cricketer who played in Tests in 1972
- Ramakant Achrekar – In 1990, he was honoured with the Dronacharya Award for his services to cricket coaching
- Salil Ankola – He was the first player to hit a sixer on the first ball of the match, he did so on to Pakistani legend Imran Khan
- Sameer Dighe – Was an Indian cricketer. He is a right-handed batsman and a wicketkeeper
- Sanjay Bangar – He scored 100 not out against Zimbabwe at Nagpur batting at number 7
- Subhash Gupte – He was one of Test cricket's finest spin bowlers. Sir Garry Sobers pronounced him the best leg spinner that it had been his pleasure to see
- Sachin Tendulkar – He is the First Indian to score 100 Internationals 100's in the game of cricket
- Sairaj Bahutule – Is an Indian cricketer. He is an allrounder who specialises in leg-spinbowling
- Sandeep Patil – Is a former Indian cricketer, also former Kenya national team coach, who made the minnows reach the semi-final of the 2003 World Cup
- Sanjay Manjrekar – His first notable performance at the international level came in the 1989 series against the West Indies in the West Indies.
- Sunil Gavaskar – Is the First Indian to aggregate more than 700 runs in a series, and this 774 runs at 154.80 remains the most runs scored in a debut series by any batsman
- Ruturaj Gaikwad – Is Indian cricketer, Captained team India in 2020 Asian Games and won Gold medal, First Indian to score a T20I century vs Australia, leads Chennai Super Kings in Indian Premier League.
- Vinod Kambli – He made two double-centuries and two centuries in seven tests
- Vijay Hazare – Is a former Indian cricketer, becoming the First Indian player to complete 1000 Test Runs
- Vijay Manjrekar – Former Indian cricketer who played 55 Tests, holds the records for the most test runs scored without hitting a single six
- Sushil Nadkarni – Indian-American cricketer
- Paras Mhambrey – 2 Tests and 1 ODI
- Abey Kuruvilla – 10 Tests and 25 ODI's
- Rohan Gavaskar – 11 ODI's India

== Badminton ==
- Nandu Natekar – The First Indian to win a title abroad – the Men's singles in the Selangor International Tournament in Kuala Lumpur in 1956, the First Arjuna Award winner
- Nikhil Kanetkar – Badminton Player
- Aditi Mutatkar – She was a Semifinalist Croatia open 2008 and Pre quarter finalist in Yonex sunrise Indian open – Hyderabad in 2008
- Damayanti Tambay – Four times national champion
- Sukant Kadam - Professional Para badminton Player. Many International Gold Medal winner. Former World no 2.
- Nilesh Gaikwad - Professional Para badminton Player. Asian Youth Games Dubai 2017 Silver Medalist. Uganda Para Badminton International 2017 Gold Medalist.

== Chess ==
- Pravin Thipsay - GM (1997)
- Abhijit Kunte - GM (2000)
- Swati Ghate - WGM (2004)
- Rucha Pujari - WIM (2017), previously WFM (2006)
- Vidit Gujrathi - GM (2013)
- Raunak Sadhvani - GM (2020)
- Swapnil Dhopade - GM (2016)
- Abhimanyu Puranik - GM (2017)
- Akshayraj Kore - GM (2013)
- Sagar Shah - IM (2014)
- Soumya Swaminathan - IM (2020) and WGM (2008)
- Divya Deshmukh - WIM (2020)

== Bodybuilding ==
- Suhas Khamkar
- Sangram Chougule

== Rifle & Pistol Shooting ==
- Anjali Bhagwat - Four gold medal winner at Manchester Commonwealth games 2002
- Tejaswini Sawant – First Indian woman shooter to win gold at the World Championships. Gold medalist at Commonwealth Games at Melbourne.
- Rahi Sarnobat – Gold medal winner at Delhi Commonwealth 2010

== Football ==
- Mahesh Gawli – India national football team member
- Sameer Naik – India national football team member
- Brahmanand Sankhwalkar – Prominent soccer player
- Ramchandra Parab – Footballer who played for India in the 1948 Olympics in England
- Raju Gaikwad - India national football team member
- Mandar Rao Desai

== Long Distance running ==
- Kavita Raut – Is a long-distance runner, holds current Indian National record for 10 km road running with a mark of 34:32, set at the Sunfeast World 10K in Bangalore
- Lalita Babar - She predominantly competes in the 3000 metres steeplechase and is the current Indian national record holder and the reigning Asian Champion in the same event.

== Mountaineering ==
- Ashish Mane - First Maharashtrian to climb four of the fourteen peaks over 8,000 metres (26,000 ft) above sea level.
- Krushnaa Patil – Second Youngest Indian to climb Mt. Everest at the age of 19, First Maharashtrian woman to climb Mt. Everest

== Wrestlers ==
- Khashaba Jadhav – First Olympic medal for India in 1952
- Rahul Aware
- Maruti Mane
- Ganpat Andhalkar
- Harishchandra Birajdar

== Field Hockey ==
- Tushar Khandekar – Hockey Forward, often referred to as "The Goal Poacher" ^{[1]}
- Bandu Patil - Tokyo Olympics 1964
- Shantaram Jadhav - Rome Olympics 1960
- Govind Sawant - Rome Olympics 1960

== Parachute Jump ==
- Shital Mahajan - Skydiver, the Government of India honored with Padma Shri in 2011.

== Swimming ==
- Murlikant Petkar - Swimmer, First Paralympic medal for India, gold medal in 1972 Summer Paralympics.
- Virdhawal Khade - Swimmer, India's fastest swimmer, Olympian

== Tennis ==
- Gaurav Natekar
- Prarthana Thombare

== See also ==
- List of Marathi People in the performing arts
