= List of IIT Bombay people =

This is a list of notable faculty and alumni of the IIT Bombay.

== Notable faculty ==
Name	Affiliation	Notability	References
Amit Agrawal	Institute chair professor, Department of Mechanical Engineering		
Ashwin Gumaste	Institute Chair Professor, Department of Computer Science	Shanti Swarup Bhatnagar awardee and largest technology transfer between IIT and industry (Carrier Ethernet Switch Router)	
Dipan Ghosh	Deputy Director from 2005 to 2006	Theoretical physicist, originator of the Majumdar–Ghosh model.	
Deepak B. Phatak		Computer scientist, Padma Shri award winner	
Hemchandra Kekre	Head of Computer Science Department, 1978 to 1984	Computer scientist	
G. Naresh Patwari		Chemist and Shanti Swarup Bhatnagar laureate	
Manohar Vartak	Professor Emeritus of Mathematics and Statistics	Mathematician	
N. K. Naik	Professor	Aerospace engineer	
Narayan R. Kamath	Professor and Head of Chemical Engineering	Chemical Engineer	
Pramod P. Wangikar	Professor at the Department of Chemical Engineering	Bioinformatician, N-Bios laureate	
Ram Puniyani	Former Professor, Biosciences and Bioengineering	Biomedical engineer	
Ranjith Padinhateeri	Dr. PV Sukhatme Chair Professor, Biosciences and Bioengineering	The National Bioscience Award for Career Development, one of the highest Indian science awards, for his contributions to biosciences, in 2017–18	
Ravi Poovaiah	Professor at IDC School of Design	Co-designed the Indian EVM	
Tathagat Avatar Tulsi	Assistant Professor on contract from 2010 to 2019	Physicist	
Devang Vipin Khakhar	Professor Chemical Engineering at IITB	Former director of IIT Bombay	

== Notable alumni ==
=== Arts, Humanities and Social Sciences ===
Name	Class Year	Degree	Notability	References
Jag Mundhra	1968	B.Tech. (Electrical Engineering)	Film director	
Mansoor Khan			Film director	
Nitesh Tiwari	1996	B.Tech. (Metallurgical Engineering)	Film director and screenwriter	
Sharada Srinivasan	1987	B.Tech. Engineering Physics	Archaeologist	
Rajnesh Domalpalli	1984	B.Tech. (Electrical Engineering)	Film director	
Satyendra Pakhalé	1991	M.Des.	Industrial Designer, Architect	
D. Udaya Kumar	2003; 2010	M.Des., Ph.D.	Head of the Department of Design, IIT Guwahati	
Vipul Goyal	2008	B.Tech., M.Tech. (Electrical Engineering)	Stand-up comedian	
Sridhar Rangayan	1986	M.Des, IDC	Director and Producer	
Sameer Saxena	2006	B.Tech.	Actor, Director and Producer. Former CCO at TVF	

=== Business ===
Name	Class Year	Degree	Notability	References
Anil Kumar		B.Tech. (Mechanical Engineering)	Senior Partner at McKinsey & Company, later convicted of insider trading	
Ashish Chauhan	1989	B.Tech. (Mechanical Engineering)	Managing Director and Chief Executive Officer of the National Stock Exchange of India	
Bhavish Aggarwal	2008	B.Tech. (Computer Science and Engineering)	Co-founder of Ola Cabs	
Bharat Desai	1975	B.Tech. (Electrical Engineering)	Founder of Syntel	
Kanwal Rekhi	1967	B.Tech. (Electrical Engineering)	Venture capitalist; Co-founder of Excelan	
Nandan Nilekani	1978	B.Tech. (Electrical Engineering)	Co-founder of Infosys	
Parag Agrawal	2005	B.Tech. (Computer Science and Engineering)	Chief Executive Officer of X (social network)	
Parag Saxena	1977	B.Tech. (Chemical Engineering)	Co-founder and former Chief Executive Officer of New Silk Route	
Rahul Yadav		Joined with B.Tech. (Metallurgical Engineering) Later dropped out.	Co-founder and former Chief Executive Officer of Housing.com	
Rajiv L. Gupta	1967	B.Tech. (Mechanical Engineering)	Chairman of Aptiv	
Ramani Ayer	1969	B.Tech. (Chemical Engineering)	Former Chairman and Chief Executive Officer of The Hartford	
Romesh Wadhwani	1969	B.Tech. (Electrical Engineering)	Founder of Symphony Technology Group	
Salil Parekh	1986	B.Tech. (Aeronautical Engineering)	Chief Executive Officer of Infosys	
Subrah Iyar	1981	B.Tech. (Electrical Engineering)	Co-founder of Webex	
Victor Menezes	1970	B.Tech. (Electrical Engineering)	Corporate Banker; Senior Vice Chairman of Citigroup	
Abhijeet Gholap	1994	M.Tech. (Biomedical Engineering)	Co-founder of BioImagene (acquired by Roche for ~US$100 million); founder of OptraSCAN	

=== Politics, Law, and Civil Services ===
Name	Class Year	Degree	Notability	References
Colin Gonsalves	1975	B.Tech. (Civil Engineering)	Senior Advocate of the Supreme Court of India	
Jairaj Phatak			Former Municipal Commissioner of Mumbai	
Jairam Ramesh	1975	B.Tech. (Mechanical Engineering)	Former Minister of Rural Development and Member of Parliament	
Jay Narayan Vyas			Former Member of the Legislative Assembly	
Manohar Parrikar	1978	B.Tech. (Metallurgical Engineering)	Former Chief Minister of Goa and Minister of Defence	
Sanjiv Bhatt	1985		Former Indian Police Service officer	
Sharjeel Imam	2010	B.Tech., M.Tech. (Computer Science & Engineering)	Activist	
Sheel Kant Sharma	1971; 1974	M.Sc. (Physics); Ph.D. (Physics)	Former Secretary General of SAARC	

=== Science and technology ===
Name	Class Year	Degree	Notability	References
Apoorva D. Patel		M.Sc. (Physics)	Physicist	
Hemchandra Kekre		M.Tech. (Electrical Engineering)	Head of Department of Computer Science, IIT Bombay	
C. V. Seshadri		B.Tech. (Chemical Engineering)	Former chair of chemical engineering at IIT Kanpur	
Shankar Sastry	1977	B.Tech. (Electrical Engineering)	Founding chancellor of the Plaksha University, Mohali and a former Dean of Engineering at University of California, Berkeley	
K. S. Dasgupta		Ph.D.	former Director of the IIST	
Pranav Mistry	2005	M. Sc.	Computer Scientist and Inventor	
Narendra Karmarkar	1978	B.Tech. (Electrical Engineering)	Mathematician	
Pratim Biswas	1980		Chair of the Department of Energy, Environmental and Chemical Engineering at Washington University in St. Louis	
Ramakrishna V. Hosur	1973	M.Sc. (Chemistry)		
Ravindran Kannan	1974	B.Tech. (Electrical Engineering)	Mathematician; Recipient of the Fulkerson Prize and Knuth Prize	
Sarita Adve	1987	B.Tech. (Electrical Engineering)	Professor of computer science at the University of Illinois at Urbana-Champaign	
Subhash Khot	1999		Computer scientist	
Suhas Patankar	1965	M.Tech. (Mechanical Engineering)	Mechanical Engineer	
T. V. Raman	1989	M.Sc. (Mathematics)	Computer scientist	
Gaurav Bubna	2009	Computer Science	Computer scientist	

=== Sports ===
Name	Class Year	Degree	Notability	References
Ajay Khare		M.Tech. (Mechanical Engineering)	Silver Medal for India at Bridge Asian Games, 2022.	

=== Others ===
- Achyut Godbole, businessman and writer
- Ajit Ranade, economist and vice chancellor of Gokhale Institute Of Politics & Economics, Pune
- Anil Kamath, Indian-American computer scientist
- Anil Kumar, Indian-American businessman
- Arun Netravali, Indian-American computer engineer and former president of Bell Labs
- Atul Tandon, management academic and former director of MICA (institute)
- Avinash Deshpande, astrophysicist and professor of physics at Raman Research Institute
- Beheruz Sethna, Indian-American business academic
- Dharmendra Modha, Indian-American computer scientist
- Dinesh Mohan, honorary professor at the IIT Delhi
- Dulal Panda, cell biologist and chair professor at the IIT Bombay
- Gauranga Das, monk and spiritual leader at ISKCON and author
- George Varghese, Indian-American computer scientist
- Lalit Surajmal Kanodia, entrepreneur and chairman of Datamatics
- Madan Rao, condensed matter and biophysicist at the National Centre for Biological Sciences, Bangalore
- Madhavan Mukund, director and professor at the Chennai Mathematical Institute
- Manas Kumar Santra, cell biologist and biochemist at the National Centre for Cell Science, Pune
- Narendra Kumar, theoretical physicist
- Nitin Nohria, Indian-American academic and former dean of Harvard Business School
- N. K. Naik, aerospace engineer and professor emeritus at the IIT Bombay
- P. P. Parikh, Indian engineer
- Prashant Ranade, Indian-American business executive and former co-chair of Syntel, Inc.
- Pravin Krishna, Indian-American economist
- Rajive Bagrodia, Indian-American computer scientist and entrepreneur
- Sadanand Joshi, Indian-American petroleum engineer and president of Joshi Technologies International, Inc
- Sudheendra Kulkarni, politician and columnist
- Suresh P. Sethi, Indian-American engineer and academic
- Umesh Waghmare, theoretical physicist and professor at Jawaharlal Nehru Centre for Advanced Scientific Research, Bangalore
- Vikas Joshi, founder of Harbinger group
- Vinay K. Nandicoori, immunologist and the director of Centre for Cellular and Molecular Biology, Hyderabad
- Viral Acharya, economist and former deputy governor of Reserve Bank of India
- V. V. Chari, Indian-American economist and professor at University of Minnesota
