= Nada Sanders =

American supply chain expert (born 1957)

Nada R. Sanders
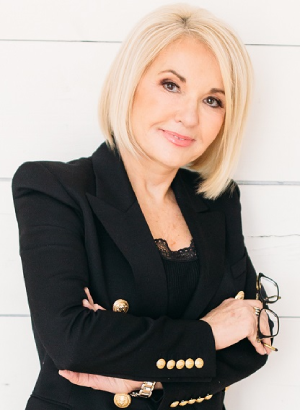

Academic background
- Education: Franklin University; Ohio State University
- Thesis: Forecasting short term demand in the physical distribution environment (1986)
- Doctoral advisor: Larry P. Ritzman

Academic work
- Institutions: Wright State University; Texas Christian University; Lehigh University; Northeastern University

Nada Rankovic Sanders is an American university professor specializing in forecasting and supply-chain management. She is the Distinguished Professor of Supply Chain Management at the D’Amore-McKim School of Business at Northeastern University. She is also a research scholar, academic editor, reference book author, keynote speaker, business consultant, and corporate board member. Her forecasts describing the impact of the economic crisis on supply disruptions resulting from the COVID-19 pandemic received media coverage. Her latest book The Humachine, as well as her 2023 article published in HBR (both co-authored with John D. Wood) explore the influence of artificial intelligence over world business, culture and skills.

== Early life and education ==
Sanders was born in Kraljevo in the former Yugoslavia. She studied mechanical engineering at Franklin University, where she received a BS in Engineering Technology in 1978. She went on to study at Ohio State University in Columbus, Ohio, where she received an MBA in 1981 from the Fisher College of Business and a PhD in operations management and logistics at the same place under the supervision of Larry Ritzman.

== Career ==
Sanders joined Wright State University after graduation, where she progressed from assistant professor to professor. Later, she has successively been the West Chair at the Neely School of Business at Texas Christian University (2007–2009), Iacocca Chair of Supply Chain Management at Lehigh University (2009–2014), and Distinguished Professor of Supply Chain Management at the D’Amore-McKim School of Business at Northeastern University (2014 to present).

Her research has centered on topics such as forecasting methods, management technologies, and resilience of supply chains, her works being commonly cited by subject reviews, and referred as reading in university courses covering these matters. Her research is cited in current Wikipedia entries on forecasting, global value chain, electronic business, logistics, operations management procurement, supply chain, and supply chain management.

In 1996, Sanders was ranked among major contributors to the field of production and operations management in the US in preceding years, according to a study from the David Eccles School of Business, University of Utah. She has been a keynote speaker at conferences in her specialties.

As an institutional executive, she has served as a president of the Production and Operations Management Society (POMS, 2019), a Fellow and vice-president of Decision Sciences Institute, a member of the Board of Economic Advisors of the Association of Industries of Massachusetts (AIM), and a member of the Board of Consultants of the International Institute of Forecasters (IIF).

As an editor, Sanders is a member of the editorial boards of several academic journals, among them the Journal of Business Logistics, the Journal of Supply Chain Management, and Production and Operations Management. She has also been a co-editor of several special journal issues, including "Big Data Driven Supply Chain Management" (Production and Operations Management, 2017), "Big Data Driven Forecasting in Supply Chain Management" (International Journal of Forecasting, 2017), "Perspectives on Big Data" (Operations Management, 2018), "Sustainable Supply Chains in a Digital Interconnected World," (Journal of Business Logistics, 2019), and "Using Interdisciplinary Research to Address Contemporary SCM Problems" (Journal of Business Logistics, 2016).

== Selected works ==
=== Papers ===
Sanders has published over 120 articles in peer-reviewed academic journals which have been cited over 6,400 times; her most cited papers are:

- Sanders, Nada R.; Premus, Robert (March 1, 2005). "Modeling the Relationship Between Firm It Capability, Collaboration, and Performance". Journal of Business Logistics. 26 (1): 1–23. doi:10.1002/j.2158-1592.2005.tb00192.x. Cited by 572 Related articles (Oct 2021).
- Sanders, Nada R. (November 1, 2007). "An empirical study of the impact of e-business technologies on organizational collaboration and performance". Journal of Operations Management. 25 (6): 1332–1347. doi:10.1016/j.jom.2007.01.008. Cited by 536 Related articles (Oct 2021).
- Sanders, Nada R. (May 1, 2008). "Pattern of information technology use: The impact on buyer-suppler coordination and performance". Journal of Operations Management. 26 (3): 349–367. doi:10.1016/j.jom.2007.07.003. Cited by 365 Related articles (Oct 2021).

Her most recent articles refer to the impact of Artificial intelligence on business and supply chains:

- Sanders, Nada R.; Boone, Tonya; Ganeshan, Ram; Wood, John D. (2019). "Sustainable Supply Chains in the Age of AI and Digitization: Research Challenges and Opportunities". Journal of Business Logistics. 40 (3): 229–240. doi:10.1111/jbl.12224. ISSN 0735-3766. S2CID 203336486.
- Sanders, Nada R.; Wood, John D. (August 24, 2020). "The Secret to AI Is People". Harvard Business Review. ISSN 0017-8012.

=== Books ===
- Sanders, Nada R. (2014). Big data driven supply chain management : a framework for implementing analytics and turning information into intelligence. Upper Saddle River, New Jersey. ISBN 978-0-13-380128-6. OCLC 884488830.
- Sanders, Nada R. (2014). The definitive guide to manufacturing and service operations : master the strategies and tactics for planning, organizing, and managing how products and services are produced. Council of Supply Chain Management Professionals. Upper Saddle River, N.J.: Pearson Education. ISBN 978-0-13-343865-9. OCLC 869214320.
- Sanders, Nada (2015). Forecasting Fundamentals. New York: Business Expert Press. ISBN 978-1-60649-871-2. OCLC 963785275.
- Sanders, Nada R. (2018). Supply chain management : a global perspective (Second ed.). Hoboken, NJ. ISBN 978-1-119-39219-4. OCLC 992120081.
- Reid, R. Dan (2019). Operations management : an integrated approach. Nada R. Sanders (Seventh ed.). Hoboken, NJ. ISBN 978-1-119-49733-2. OCLC 1119125081.
- Sanders, Nada R. (2020). Foundations of sustainable business : theory, function, and strategy. John D. Wood (Second ed.). Hoboken, NJ. ISBN 978-1-119-57755-3. OCLC 1124775883.
- Sanders, Nada R. (2020). The humachine : humankind, machines, and the future of enterprise. John D. Wood (First ed.). New York, NY. ISBN 978-0-429-00117-8. OCLC 1119391268.. Favorably reviewed by Garth Thomas.

== Honors ==
- Fellow, Decision Science Institute (2008)
- Named Eunice and James L. West Chair and Professor in Supply Chain Management, Neeley School of Business, Texas Christian University, (2007–2009)
- Carl & Ingeborg Beidleman Research Award in Business & Economics (Leigh University, 2012)
- Named Iacocca Chair and Professor of Supply Chain Management, Lehigh University (2009–2014)
