= Panos Kouvelis =

Greek-American business professor

Panagiotis "Panos" Kouvelis is the Emerson Distinguished Professor of Supply Chain, Operations, and Technology and director of The Boeing Center for Supply Chain Innovation at the Olin Business School at Washington University in St. Louis. He is best known for his work on supply chain management, supply chain finance, operational excellence, and risk management.

== Early life and education ==
Kouvelis was born in Greece. After graduating from National Technical University of Athens in 1983, he moved to the United States, where he went on to earn an MBA from the Marshall School of Business and an MSISE from the Industrial and Systems Engineering Department of the Viterbi School of Engineering at the University of Southern California (USC). In 1988, he earned his PhD from the Management Science and Engineering department at Stanford University.

== Career ==
Kouvelis served as an assistant professor at the University of Texas at Austin from 1988 to 1991 and an associate professor at Duke University's Fuqua School of Business from 1992 to 1997. He visited Washington University in St. Louis from 1996 to 1997, where he accepted a full professor position in 1997. He was installed as the inaugural Emerson Distinguished Professor of Operations and Manufacturing Management in 2000. Kouvelis served as the senior associate dean and director of executive programs at the Olin Business School from 2009 to 2013, as well as area chair of the Operations and Manufacturing Management department from 2005 to 2009. He has accepted visiting professorships at the WHU – Otto Beisheim School of Management, the University of Chicago, and Hong Kong Polytechnic University.

Kouvelis is an editor for the journals Production & Operations Management and Manufacturing and Service Operations Management, and is the editor-in-chief of Foundations and Trends in Technology, Information and Operations Management. He has offered editorial services for all top operations research journals, including Operations Research and Management Science.

== The Boeing Center for Supply Chain Innovation ==
Kouvelis was a founding co-director of The Boeing Center for Technology, Information, and Manufacturing in 1997. He became the director of the center in 2000, and continues to direct it. The center was renamed to The Boeing Center for Supply Chain Innovation (BCSCI) in 2016.

== Awards and honors ==
- INFORMS Fellow Award (2025) - Highest honor in INFORMS. Recognized for advancing the theories and practice of global supply chains, operations management, and integrated operations and financing decision making.
- Distinguished MSOM Fellow Award (2022) - Highest honor that can be bestowed upon a research scholar in the field of operations management. Rare distinction, akin to a lifetime achievement award, recognizes outstanding scholarship and research accomplishments throughout one’s career.
- Fellow of POMS Award (2016) - Lifetime achievement award for contributions in the field of operations management, awarded by the Production and Operations Management Society. (POMS)
- Received Laudatio in the November 2020 issue of Production and Operations Management. This honorific recognition is reserved for scholars with significant contributions to the field of Operations Management via research and teaching.
- In a recent OM research productivity study published in Decision Sciences that focused on top-50 OM researchers from the 2001-2015 period who published in the top 4 OM journals (Manufacturing & Service Operations Management, Production and Operations Management, Journal of Operations Management, and Management Science), Kouvelis was ranked:

- #3 in total number of papers published (27 papers)
- #2 in yearly publication rate (1.867 papers per year)
- #1 in total papers published in M&SOM (10 papers)
- #2 in total number of papers, weighted for co-authorship (Management Science publications included in all departments, with some OM linkage)

- Top 5 Operations Management Research Ranking (2015) - Ranked as the 5th most productive researcher in the field.
- Finalist, 2022 MSOM iFORM SIG Best Paper Award Competition - “A Supply Chain Theory of Factoring and Reverse Factoring.” Management Science (2021) 67(10): 6071-6088)
- Best Research Paper Award - IIE Transactions on Operations Engineering . Awarded by the Institute of Industrial Engineers for the best research paper in the Institute’s flagship publication of IIE Transactions.

== Bibliography ==
- Research monograph on “Robust Discrete Optimization and its Applications.” Kluwer Academic Publishers, Amsterdam, 1997.
- Global Operations and Logistics: Text and Cases, Wiley, NY, 1998.
- “Supply chain management research and Production and Operations Management: Review, trends, and opportunities,” Prod Oper Manage 15(3):449-469, 2006.
- “Robust Scheduling to Hedge against Processing Time Uncertainty in Single-Stage Production.” Management Science 41(2):363–376, 1995.
- “Flexible and Risk Sharing Supply Contracts Under Price Uncertainty,” Management Science 45(10):1378–1398, 1999.
- "Financing the newsvendor: supplier vs. bank, and the structure of optimal trade credit contracts,” Operations Research 60(3):566-580, 2012.
- "Impact of Tariffs on Global Supply Chain Network Configuration: Models, Predictions, and Future Research," Manufacturing & Service Operations Management, 2020.
- "Cash Hedging in a Supply Chain," Management Science, 2019.
- "Parkinson's Law and Its Implications for Project Management," Management Science, 1991.
