= Suresh P. Sethi =

Indian-American mathematician

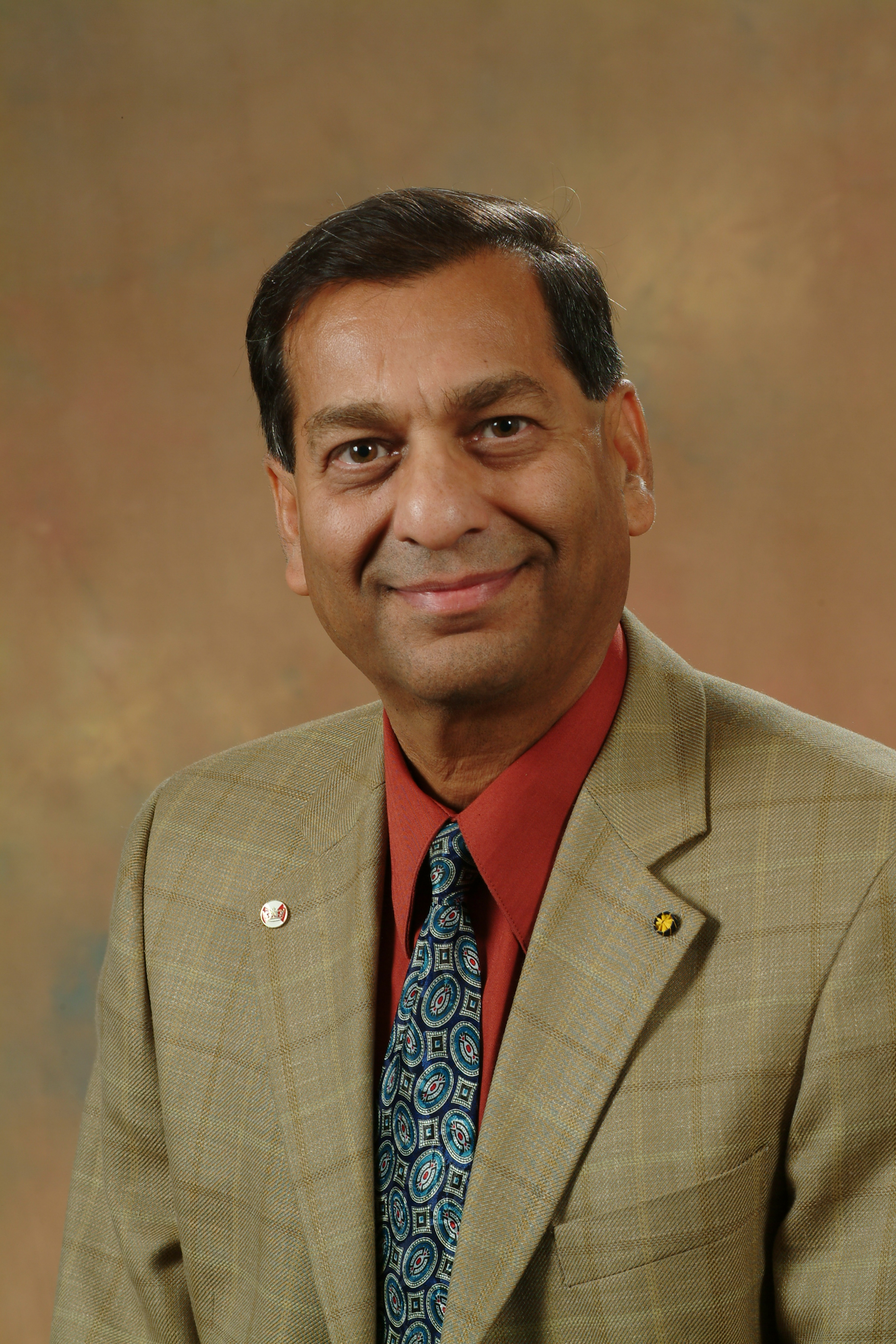
- Citizenship: United States
- Education: Carnegie Mellon University; Washington State University; IIT Bombay
- Known for: Sethi model, Sethi-Skiba point, K-convexity in Rn
- Awards: Society for Industrial and Applied Mathematics Fellow (2009), IIT Bombay Distinguished Alum (2008)
- Scientific career
- Fields: Operations management, optimal control, Manufacturing, Operations Research, Finance, Economics, Marketing, Industrial Engineering, Optimal Control
- Workplaces: University of Texas at Dallas, University of Toronto, Rice University, Weyerhaeuser Company, Omark Industries, Hindustan Motors, Bhilai Steel Plant
- Patrons: Eugene McDermott
- Thesis: Applications of Optimal Control Theory in Management Science and Economics
- Doctoral advisor: Gerald L. Thompson, Timothy McGuire, Charles Newman,
- Other academic advisors: George Dantzig
- Notable students: Subodha Kumar, Steef van de Velde
- Website: http://www.utdallas.edu/~sethi

Suresh P. Sethi is an Indian-American mathematician who is the Eugene McDermott Chair of Operations Management and Director of the Center for Intelligent Supply Networks at the University of Texas at Dallas.

He has worked as departmental editor of Production and Operations Management, corresponding editor of SIAM Journal on Control and Optimization, and associate editor of Operations Research, Manufacturing & Service Operations Management, and Automatica.

== Education ==
Sethi received his PhD in operations research from Carnegie Mellon University and was a post-doctoral fellow at Stanford University under the supervision of George B. Dantzig. He obtained a B.Tech. with honors in Mechanical Engineering from the Indian Institute of Technology Bombay, a M.S. in Industrial Administration from Carnegie Mellon University, and a Master of Business Administration from Washington State University.

== Published books ==
- Sethi, Suresh P. (2019). Optimal Control Theory. doi:10.1007/978-3-319-98237-3. ISBN 978-3-319-98236-6.
- Sethi, Suresh P.; Thompson, Gerald L. (1981). Solutions Manual for Optimal Control Theory. doi:10.1007/978-94-017-3028-0 (inactive 1 July 2025). ISBN 978-0-89838-074-3.
- Sethi, Suresh P.; Zhang, Qing (1994). Hierarchical Decision Making in Stochastic Manufacturing Systems. doi:10.1007/978-1-4612-0285-1. ISBN 978-1-4612-6694-5.
- Sethi, Suresh P. (1997). Optimal Consumption and Investment with Bankruptcy. doi:10.1007/978-1-4615-6257-3. ISBN 978-1-4613-7871-6.
- Optimal Control Theory. 2000. doi:10.1007/0-387-29903-3. ISBN 0-387-28092-8.
- Average-Cost Control of Stochastic Manufacturing Systems. Stochastic Modelling and Applied Probability. Vol. 54. 2005. doi:10.1007/0-387-27615-7. ISBN 0-387-21947-1.
- Sethi, Suresh P.; Yan, Houmin; Zhang, Hanqin (2005). Inventory and Supply Chain Management with Forecast Updates. International Series in Operations Research & Management Science. Vol. 81. doi:10.1007/b135819. ISBN 978-1-4020-8123-1.
- Throughput Optimization in Robotic Cells. International Series in Operations Research & Management Science. Vol. 101. 2007. doi:10.1007/0-387-70988-6. ISBN 978-0-387-70987-1.
- Beyer, Dirk; Cheng, Feng; Sethi, Suresh P.; Taksar, Michael (2010). Markovian Demand Inventory Models. International Series in Operations Research & Management Science. Vol. 108. doi:10.1007/978-0-387-71604-6. ISBN 978-0-387-56563-7.
- Sethi, Suresh P.; Bogataj, Marija; Ros-Mcdonnell, Lorenzo, eds. (2012). Industrial Engineering: Innovative Networks. doi:10.1007/978-1-4471-2321-7. ISBN 978-1-4471-2320-0.

== Research works ==
Sethi's publications have been cited 31850 times in total, with 86 h-index and 334 i10-index. He has contributed in the fields of manufacturing and operations management, finance and economics, marketing, industrial engineering, operations research, and optimal control. He is known for his developments of the Sethi advertising model and Sethi-Skiba point, and for his textbook on optimal control.

=== Notable works ===
Sethi is known for his accomplishments in unifying many theories and concepts in Sethi model, Sethi-Skiba point, K-convexity in Rn Decision and Forecast Horizons, and Supply Chain Coordination with Risk Averse Agents.

==== Sethi model ====
The Sethi model describes the process of how sales evolve over time in response to advertising. The model assumes that the rate of change in sales depend on three effects: response to advertising that acts positively on the unsold portion of the market, the loss due to forgetting or possibly due to competitive factors that act negatively on the sold portion of the market, and a random effect that can go either way. The following are related journal publications over the years that established and generalized Sethi model.

- Sethi, Suresh P. (April 1983). "Deterministic and stochastic optimization of a dynamic advertising model". Optimal Control Applications and Methods. 4 (2): 179–184. doi:10.1002/oca.4660040207. ISSN 0143-2087.
- Kennedy, Adrian Patrick; Sethi, Suresh P.; Siu, Chi Chung; Yam, Sheung Chi Phillip (November 2021). "Cooperative Advertising in a Dynamic Three-Echelon Supply Chain". Production and Operations Management. 30 (11): 3881–3905. doi:10.1111/poms.13487. ISSN 1059-1478.
- Bass, Frank M.; Krishnamoorthy, Anand; Prasad, Ashutosh; Sethi, Suresh P. (November 2005). "Generic and Brand Advertising Strategies in a Dynamic Duopoly". Marketing Science. 24 (4): 556–568. doi:10.1287/mksc.1050.0119. ISSN 0732-2399.
- Naik, P. A.; Prasad, A.; Sethi, S. P. (2008). "Building Brand Awareness in Dynamic" Naik, Prasad A.; Prasad, Ashutosh; Sethi, Suresh P. (January 2008). "Building Brand Awareness in Dynamic Oligopoly Markets". Management Science. 54 (1): 129–138. doi:10.1287/mnsc.1070.0755. ISSN 0025-1909.
- Prasad, Ashutosh; Sethi, Suresh P. (2009-03-01). "Integrated marketing communications in markets with uncertainty and competition". Automatica. 45 (3): 601–610. doi:10.1016/j.automatica.2008.09.018. ISSN 0005-1098.
- He, Xiuli; Prasad, Ashutosh; Sethi, Suresh P. (January 2009). "Cooperative Advertising and Pricing in a Dynamic Stochastic Supply Chain: Feedback Stackelberg Strategies". Production and Operations Management. 18 (1): 78–94. doi:10.1111/j.1937-5956.2009.01006.x. ISSN 1059-1478.
- Bensoussan, Alain; Chen, Shaokuan; Chutani, Anshuman; Sethi, Suresh P.; Siu, Chi Chung; Phillip Yam, Sheung Chi (January 2019). "Feedback Stackelberg--Nash Equilibria in Mixed Leadership Games with an Application to Cooperative Advertising". SIAM Journal on Control and Optimization. 57 (5): 3413–3444. doi:10.1137/17M1153212. ISSN 0363-0129.
- Kennedy, Adrian Patrick; Sethi, Suresh P.; Siu, Chi Chung; Yam, Sheung Chi Phillip (November 2021). "Cooperative Advertising in a Dynamic Three-Echelon Supply Chain". Production and Operations Management. 30 (11): 3881–3905. doi:10.1111/poms.13487. ISSN 1059-1478.
- Han, Jinhui; Sethi, Suresh P.; Siu, Chi Chung; Yam, Sheung Chi Phillip (June 2023). "Co-op advertising in randomly fluctuating markets". Production and Operations Management. 32 (6): 1617–1635. doi:10.1111/poms.13929. ISSN 1059-1478.

==== Sethi-Skiba point ====
Sethi-Skiba points arise in optimal control problems that exhibit multiple optimal solutions. A Sethi-Skiba point is an indifference point in an optimal control problem such that starting from such a point, the problem has more than one different optimal solutions.

- Sethi, S. P. (1977-12-01). "Nearest feasible paths in optimal control problems: Theory, examples, and counterexamples". Journal of Optimization Theory and Applications. 23 (4): 563–579. doi:10.1007/BF00933297. ISSN 1573-2878.
- Skiba, A. K. (1978). "Optimal Growth with a Convex-Concave Production Function". Econometrica. 46 (3): 527–539. doi:10.2307/1914229. ISSN 0012-9682. JSTOR 1914229.
- Sethi, S. P. (1977-12-01). "Nearest feasible paths in optimal control problems: Theory, examples, and counterexamples". Journal of Optimization Theory and Applications. 23 (4): 563–579. doi:10.1007/BF00933297. ISSN 1573-2878.
- Sethi, S. P. (1979-12-01). "Optimal advertising policy with the contagion model". Journal of Optimization Theory and Applications. 29 (4): 615–627. doi:10.1007/BF00934454. ISSN 1573-2878.

== Honors and awards ==
Sethi has been elected to Production and Operations Management Society (POMS) Fellow in 2005, one of eight individuals up to that time to be honored with that distinction in the field of Operations Management.

He is the recipient of the 2015 Tepper Alumni Achievement Award

Two conferences have been organized in his honor, at Aix-en-Provence in 2005 and at University of Texas at Dallas in 2006. Also, two books have been edited in his honor.

Year	Honor/Award
1984-85	Connaught Senior Research Fellow, University of Toronto
1996	Award of Merit, Canadian Operational Research Society (CORS)
2000	Senior Research Fellow, IC2 Institute
2003	IEEE Fellow, INFORMS Fellow, AAAS Fellow
2004	Wickham-Skinner Best Paper Award in Production and Operations Management
2005	Production and Operations Management Society Fellow
2008	IIT Bombay Distinguished Alum
2009	SIAM Fellow, Society for Industrial and Applied Mathematics
2012	President, Production and Operations Management Society (POMS)
2015	Alumni Achievement Award (Tepper School of Business, Carnegie Mellon University)
2020	Sushil K Gupta Production and Operations Management Distinguished Service Award
2024	Best Paper Award Named After Suresh Sethi (Production and Operations Management Society)
2021	Asia-Pacific Artificial Intelligence Association Fellow
2023	Journal of Operations Management Ambassador Award
