= Aleda Roth =

American management scientist

Aleda Marie V. Roth is a retired American business professor, specializing in supply chain management. At the time of her retirement in 2024, she was a Professor and the Burlington Chair in Supply Chain Management in the Clemson University Wilbur O. and Ann Powers College of Business.

== Education and career ==
Roth majored in psychology at the Ohio State University, graduating in 1968, and became chief statistician for the Arkansas Children's Colony, under the Arkansas State Department of Human Services. After earning a master's degree in biostatistics in the School of Public Health at the University of North Carolina at Chapel Hill in 1970, she became a research associate for the Epidemiologic Field Station of the Greater Kansas City Mental Health Foundation in Kansas City, Missouri and then, from 1972 to 1979, director of statistics for the American Nurses Association, also holding an adjunct faculty position in biostatistics at the University of North Carolina.

She returned to graduate study in management science at the Ohio State University in 1979, and finally completed her Ph.D. in operations management in 1986. Before finishing her doctoral degree, in 1985 she became an assistant professor of management at Boston University. In 1989 she moved to Duke University as an associate professor, jointly appointed in the Fuqua School of Business and the department of health administration in the Duke University Medical Center.

In 1993 she returned to the University of North Carolina. She was promoted to full professor in 1999, and named Mary Farley Ames Lee Distinguished Professor in 2003. She retired as professor emerita in 2005, at the same time taking the W.P. Carey Endowed Chair in Supply Chain Management at Arizona State University. She moved to her final position as Burlington Industries Distinguished Professor of Supply Chain Management at Clemson University in 2006, from which she retired in 2024.

She was president of the Production and Operations Management Society from 2002 to 2004.

== Recognition ==
Roth was named an inaugural Fellow of the Production and Operations Management Society in 2004, a Fellow of the Decision Sciences Institute in 2005, and a Distinguished Fellow of the Manufacturing and Service Operations Management Society of INFORMS in 2009. She was the 2014 winner of the WORMS Award for the Advancement of Women in Operations Research and Management Science of INFORMS.

In 2020, the Production and Operations Management journal announced that it would name a biennial best-paper award after Roth.
