= Mark Keil (professor) =

Information Systems Researcher

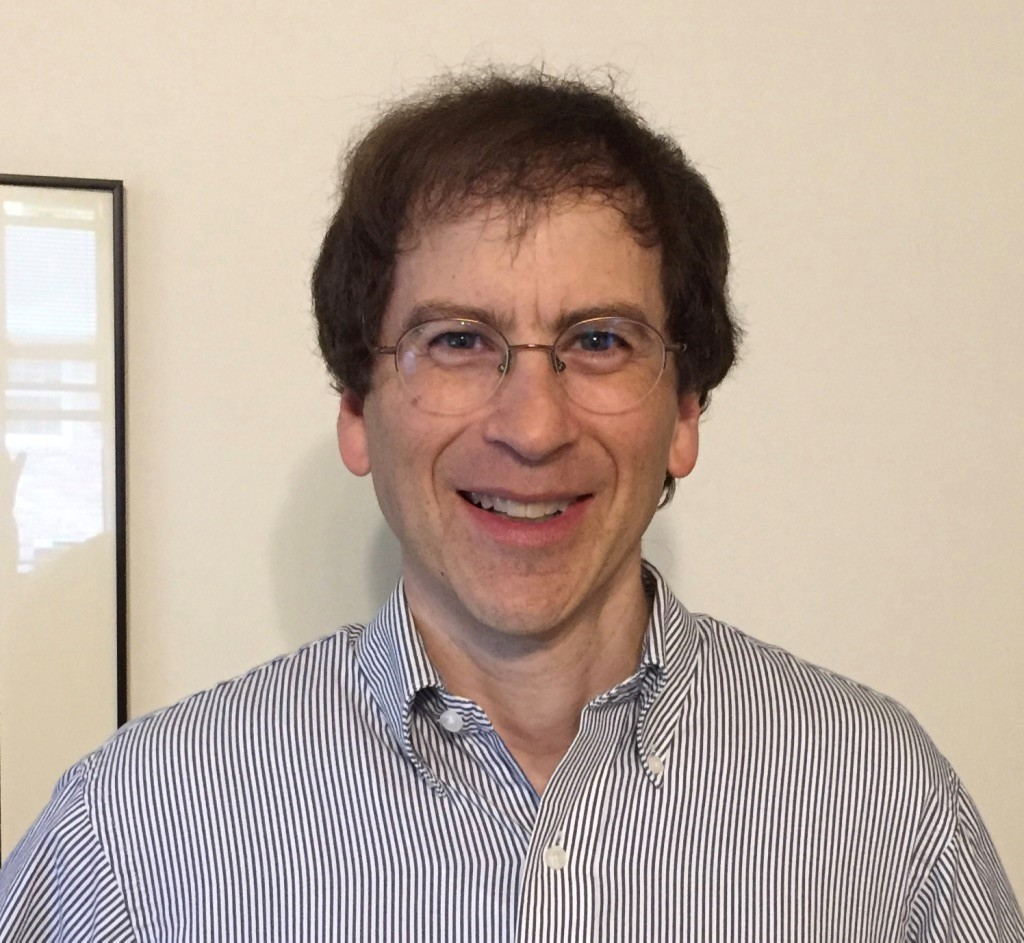
Dr. Mark Keil in 2018

Mark Keil (born 1960) is a Regents’ Professor and the John B. Zellars Professor of Computer Information Systems in the J. Mack Robinson College of Business at Georgia State University. He also holds appointments in the Department of Computer Science and the Institute of Health Administration at Georgia State University.

His research examines managerial decision-making, specifically in the context of IT projects and includes work on project escalation, project status reporting, project risk, project control, project manager skills, and technology acceptance.

He has served as a Division Chair for the Communication, Digital Technology, and Organization (CTO, formerly known as OCIS) Division of the Academy of Management. He has also held a variety of editorial positions for journals such as Information Systems Research, MIS Quarterly, Journal of Management Information Systems, Decision Sciences, Information Systems Journal, IEEE Transactions on Engineering Management, and The Data Base for Advances in Information Systems.

Keil has given many research talks at U.S. universities and has also held short visiting appointments abroad at the National University of Singapore, Australian National University, Erasmus University Rotterdam, University of Göttingen, Goethe University, University of Bamberg, and Swinburne University of Technology.

== Education ==
In 1982, he obtained his Bachelor of Science in engineering (B.S.E.) from Princeton University. He obtained his master's degree (S.M.) from the MIT Sloan School of Management in1986. He obtained a doctoral degree (D.B.A.) in Management Information Systems from the Harvard Business School (HBS) in 1991.

== Career ==
He started his career at DuPont's Experimental Station after completing his B.S.E. in Chemical Engineering. After completing his Master's, he worked as a project manager and consultant in the information systems area before enrolling in the HBS doctoral program. During his doctoral studies, he worked as an instructor at the Harvard University Extension School.

In 1991, after completing his doctoral degree, he began his academic career as an assistant professor at Georgia State University. He was tenured and promoted to the rank of associate professor in 1997 and full professor in 2002.

== Writings ==
Keil has published 130 peer-reviewed journal articles in such publications as Information Systems Research, MIS Quarterly, Journal of Management Information Systems, Decision Sciences, Strategic Management Journal, IEEE Transactions on Engineering Management, Sloan Management Review, and California Management Review. Google Scholar indicates that his work has received over 25,000 citations.

Keil's work (with co-author Anandhi Bharadwaj of Emory University) on the market impact of IT failures was featured in Baseline in 2001 titled "Bada Boom". The article noted that “on average, the stocks of publicly traded companies decline 1.75% as negative news emerges” involving an IT failure. This “decline translated into the disappearance, on average, of $650 million in stock-market value over a two-day period.”

He is regularly contacted as an expert by the media; interviews have appeared in CBS News, BusinessWeek (now part of Bloomberg), Computerworld, Baseline, Network World, ScienceDaily, The Atlanta Journal-Constitution and Carrier Management.

== Awards ==
In 2005, Keil received Georgia State University's Alumni Distinguished Professor Award which recognizes a high-achieving senior Georgia State faculty member who embodies the balance between teacher and scholar.

He is also a two-time recipient of the J. Mack Robinson College of Business Faculty Recognition Award for Distinguished Contributions in Research (2000 and 2009). He has also received many best paper awards from the AOM's CTO Division as well as from journals such as the Journal of Strategic Information Systems, Decision Sciences, and IEEE Transactions on Engineering Management.

In 2012, he was named the John B. Zellars Professor of Computer Information Systems. In 2016, he was named a Distinguished University Professor. This appointment recognizes professors who have records of exemplary scholarship in their respective fields of study, and whose research and teaching trajectories demonstrate a commitment to sustained high levels of academic achievement.

In 2018, he received the Project Management Institute's Research Achievement Award. In the same year, he received the AIS Fellow Award from the Association for Information Systems. This award recognizes individuals who have made outstanding contributions to the Information Systems discipline in terms of research, teaching, and service.

In 2019, he was appointed as a Regent's Professor of the University System of Georgia. This is the highest academic honor in the University System of Georgia. It is bestowed on professors whose scholarly achievements are recognized nationally and internationally as innovative and renowned and who have a record of sustained scholarly productivity as well as substantial contributions in service to their discipline and Georgia State University.
