= Rajiv =

Rājīv (Devanagari: राजीव, Bengali script: রাজীব) is a popular South Asian male name, also spelt Rajeev, Rajive, Rajib, Rajeeb, Rajiva and Rajiba.

It is said that the lotus flower (Nelumbo nucifera), though it grows in muddy water, doesn't accumulate the mud particles onto it; such is the quality described as rājīv. Today, in several Indian languages, including Hindi, Telugu, Bengali, Madheshi, Nepali, Assamese, Marathi and Kannada, rājīv is the word for "lotus flower".

In the Rāmāyaṇa, Rāma's epithets include Rājīv-Lochan, meaning "one whose eyes are like lotus flowers".

== Notable people named Rajiv, Rajive or Rajeev ==
- Akshay Kumar, Indian-Canadian actor and martial artist (birth name Rajiv Hari Om Bhatia)
- Rajeev, Indian Tamil language actor
- Rajiv Anchal, film director
- Rajive Bagrodia, American computer scientist
- Rajiv Bapna, founder and director of Amkette
- Rajeev Bikram Shah, Nepalese politician
- Rajiv Dixit, Indian social activist and associated with Swadeshi movement
- Rajiv Gandhi, former Prime Minister of India
- Rajiv Goswami, political activist
- Rajiv Gupta (technocrat), former general manager of Hewlett Packard's E-speak project
- Rajiv Gauba (born 1959), Indian Administrative Service and Home Secretary of India
- Rajeev Goyle, United States Congressional candidate from Kansas
- Rajeev Khandelwal, Indian actor
- Rajiv Joseph, American playwright
- Rajiv Kapoor, Indian actor
- Rajive Kumar (born 1958), Indian Administrative Service officer and former Chief Secretary of Uttar Pradesh
- Rajiv Kulkarni, Indian former cricketer
- Rajib Lochan Pegu, Indian politician
- Rajiv Mehrotra, Indian journalist
- Rajiv Menon, Indian cinematographer and director
- Rajeev Motwani, Indian professor of computer science
- Rajiv Ouseph, English professional badminton player
- Rajeev Paul, Indian actor
- Rajiv Patel, musician
- Rajiv Rai, director
- Rajeev Ram, American tennis player
- Rajiv Pratap Rudy, Bharatiya Janata Party politician
- Rajiv Satyal, Indian-American comedian
- Rajiv Shah, American government official
- Rajiv Singh (born 1958 or 1959), Indian businessman
- Rajeev Suri, chief executive officer of Nokia

== Notable people named Rajib or Rajeeb ==
- Rajib Ghosh, Indian footballer
- Rajib Ghorui, Indian footballer
- Rajib Banerjee, Indian politician
- Rajib Boro, Indian footballer
- Rajib Lochan Pegu, Indian politician
- Rajib Saha, Indian global business leader
- Rajib Dutta (born 1971), Indian former cricketer
- Rajib Dutta (born 1980), Indian former cricketer
- Rajeeb Dey, British entrepreneur
- Rajeeb Samdani, Bangladeshi industrialist and art collector

== Notable people named Rajiva ==
- Rajiva Wijesinha, Sri Lankan writer

== Rajib: places ==
- Al-Rajib in Greater Amman, Jordan
- Rajeb or Rajib, town in Jordan; ancient Regev/Reğeb/Ragaba

== See also ==
- Rajab, the seventh month of the Islamic calendar
