= Narayan R. Kamath =

Indian engineer

Narayan Rangappa Kamath
- Narayan R. Kamath
- Constituency: India

Personal details
- Born: September 8, 1914
- Died: August , 1983

Narayan Rangappa Kamath (September 8, 1914 - August 1983) was an academic leader of the Indian Institutes of Technology (IITs) and engineering education in India, an academic administrator, chemical engineer, educator, advisor to dozens of companies, and historian of technology. He was also called NRK.

== Early life and education ==
He was born in Mulki, a small town on the banks of the river Shambhavi near Mangalore in Karnataka. He completed his early education in Mulki and high school at Government College, Mangalore, in 1930.

NRK earned his B.Sc. at St. Xavier's College, Mumbai in 1934 with the unique distinction of securing 100 percent marks in chemistry, a record in Bombay University. He then joined Bombay University’s Department of Chemical Technology (UDCT), now Institute of Chemical Technology (ICT), in 1934—as the first batch of the B.Sc. (Tech) in chemical engineering—and graduated with Distinction in 1936.

After graduation, NRK was awarded the Nathubhai Mangaldas Scholarship by University of Mumbai for higher studies abroad. He joined University College London, where he completed a postgraduate diploma in chemical engineering and then started his doctoral research under the guidance of Professor H. E. Watson on the drying of pigments. Then in 1939, at the start of World War II, the laboratory where he worked was shut down, and his research was interrupted. NRK took a temporary job at the London Shellac Research Bureau hoping that his laboratory would reopen. But as the war situation worsened, the lab was completely bombed out, destroying his work which ended all his hopes of a doctoral degree. “Everything I had worked for was blasted away,” he once told his former students. Yet, it had very little impact on his career as a quintessential professor.

== Faculty positions ==
After the war, NRK got many attractive job offers in the U.K., but he chose to return to India in 1946. He joined the faculty of his alma mater UDCT, Mumbai. There, he founded the Department of Paints, Pigments and Varnishes (now the Department of Polymer and Surface Engineering) and served as its head. He also started courses in plastics, pigments, paints and varnishes, expanding laboratories in those areas.

NRK joined IIT Bombay in March 1959 as a Professor and Head of the Chemical Engineering Department, where he continued till his retirement in September 1974. He concurrently headed the chemistry and humanities departments for several years. He was also Deputy Director (provost) of IIT Bombay from 1960 to 1966 and 1970 to 1974. As Deputy Director, he was the chief academic officer of the institute. His responsibilities covered degree programs, research, and liaison with the industry.

Around 1959-1961, he was offered the choice between the position of Director of IIT Delhi or IIT Madras. He did not take it because he and Mrs. Ruzena Kamath did not want to leave Mumbai.

== Leadership roles ==
The demands for academic leaders—professors and scholars—in India during the first 25 years after independence (1947) were far more onerous than those on their counterparts in the US which had a critical mass of top scholars in every discipline and sub-discipline and each top scholar a super expert in their narrow subfield. Their expertise helped them in guiding research and providing expert advice to companies. At the time, India needed academic leaders who would build institutions and provide leadership in teaching, research, and service to the industry.

In addition, from NRK’s perspective, India, particularly Mumbai at that time, was the hub of India’s chemical industry. It had very few academic experts in chemical engineering and related fields. Thus, NRK, instead of spending all his efforts on research on a few narrowly focused topics, constantly remained on the leading edge of knowledge using three means: pursuing research with MTech and Ph.D. students that was focused mostly on applied topics, keeping up with the literature, and maintaining a close relationship with the industry. He regularly read 150 or so periodicals in science and engineering. He mostly read them during his commute in a chauffeur-driven car or the evening at home.

Since the Government of India rules put a limit on paid consulting, NRK often provided pro-bono consulting. Besides, he constantly talked to engineers, executives, and scientists at social get-togethers, professional conferences, and while visiting companies.

When he retired in 1974, in an interview with his students, NRK said, “I do not teach. I am not a teacher. I am not qualified to be a teacher. I am not even competent to be a teacher. I always said that I am an educator. Anyone who would like to be educated, I will help. Anyone who would like to learn, I will help by guiding them.”

=== Educational leader ===
When India became independent after the British occupation for 190 years, it had many economic, political, and social challenges. The new constitution came into existence on January 26, 1950, and it was a milestone toward equal political and social rights for all. The major economic challenges involved building infrastructure and promoting education at all levels. One giant step in this pursuit was the establishment of five IITs with the charter that they would pursue world-class research and offer world-class education. The undergraduate IIT education's success depended on two parameters: the selection of students and the curriculum. Professor Kamath assumed leadership roles in both.

With diverse standards in various states, there was a need to have a common set of standards for admission. Thus, when the IITs initiated a Joint Entrance Examination (JEE) in 1963, the challenge was to design the examination in chemistry, English, mathematics, and physics that evaluates fundamental knowledge without relying on the easy-to-grade option of multiple choice questions that the United States uses for its SAT and GRE examinations. Professor Kamath was responsible for designing, administering, and grading the examination. The contributions of IIT alums all over the world testify to the effectiveness of the examination. This examination still retains its central role in selecting students for admission to the undergraduate programs at the 23 IITs and is widely regarded as a key strength of the IITs.

The curriculum was the other important parameter for a world-class undergraduate program. IIT Bombay was the second IIT after Kharagpur. Here again, Professor Kamath took the leadership role. Whereas the curriculum was designed only for IIT Bombay, it had spillover effects not only on other IITs but also on other engineering and polytechnic colleges. At the time, the IITs offered a five-year undergraduate program after 11 years of schooling. Under NRK’s leadership, IIT Bombay designed a program that was arguably the most rigorous in the world. For each of the ten semesters, students had to attend lectures, tutorials, or labs for 35 hours a week. The program had three important dimensions. First, for each engineering branch (major)—chemical, civil, electrical, mechanical, and metallurgical—the program was a union of the sets of courses included in similar programs at Caltech, Imperial College, MIT, or Stanford, that is, it included almost every science or engineering subject that was included in those programs. Second, several final-year courses were designed to be equivalent to the master's level courses in breadth and rigor in the leading engineering schools in the world. Third, the program had a multidisciplinary character. For example, a mechanical engineering student was required to take certain courses in chemical, civil, electrical, and metallurgical engineering. For NRK, both depth and breadth were necessary for rigor because most problems in the real world are not confined to a single branch of engineering, and one often needs to connect the dots.

NRK also included economics, English, ethics, logic, and social philosophy. He followed the traditions of Nalanda and Takshashila, the world’s two oldest universities located in India, which had four required courses: economics, language, logic, and mathematics.

NRK also led the design of the M.Tech. and Ph.D. programs. Most US master’s programs are a yearlong, primarily consisting of coursework only. IIT Kharagpur, the only other IIT at the time, had a 14-month M.Tech. programs. NRK persuaded the education ministry, which oversaw all IITs, and IIT Kharagpur to have two-year master’s programs in engineering. The first year was spent on the coursework, and the second year on a thesis project. The M.Tech. graduates had four career options: go to industry, start a company, pursue a Ph.D. program, or teach in undergraduate programs in one of the dozens of engineering or polytechnic colleges in India. Indeed, many M.Tech. students were sponsored by those colleges. Given the goals of the students, most theses were on applied topics.

The Ph.D. programs in science and engineering followed the British model and required no formal coursework. The British model requires customized readings of scholarly books and research papers. The thesis work had complete flexibility, and its scope included all three domains: purely theoretical (non-empirical) work, lab-based work, and work dealing with real-world problems in India. At least some students used their work to start their companies.

=== Research ===
His work during the years 1940-46 at Shellac resulted in 18 publications on lac utilization. Shellac was a critical ordnance item during the Second World War. On his return to India, he published a paper “Iodometric Determination of Acid Value of Lac” with V. B. Mainkar in Analytical Chemistry. He published his works on castor oil with B. Sreenivasan and JG Kane.

=== Educator ===
NRK taught several chemical engineering courses at the postgraduate and undergraduate levels. He also developed and taught a course on economics of chemical industries. He was an effective teacher. Rekha Rege Nadkarni (1968 Chemical), the first woman to graduate in chemical engineering from an IIT, says, “Professor Kamath’s unique style of teaching, using humor to drive a point home, is something I have cherished all these years.”.

As an educator, NRK always connected with his students. As an example, when Rajendra Shende, a newly admitted undergraduate student, first met him, NRK asked him, “Tell me how you are doing, my friend.” Mr. Shende, in response, told him in his messy English that he was from a small village and asked NRK how he should study to get good grades. NRK responded,

“You come from a small village? Me too! And remember, those from small villages will have no problem learning chemical engineering at IIT. Everything that takes place in the villages is chemical engineering. Right from making fertilizer from cow dung to making jaggery and desi liquor by fermentation, it is all chemical engineering, my friend. So, you are in the right place. Come to me if you have any difficulties.’’

Shende felt reassured.

History of Technology: A Unique Required Course Taught by NRK: For an engineer, despite the IITs’ innovative education, future technological developments are always uncertain and largely unknown. The only way one can deal with rapidly evolving developments is to have knowledge about the past. This was the goal of the first-year required course, History of Technology. NRK taught all three sections. When he came to the first lecture on the history of technology, he wrote the raison ďetre of the course on the backboard, “Where there is no knowledge of the past, there is no vision for the future.” At his urging, one of his students, Kalyan Singhal, who has spent over five decades in academia, pursued research in the history of technology and published several papers, two of which he dedicated to NRK.

=== Philanthropy ===
When Professor Kamath retired in 1974 and heard that his childhood school had financial difficulties, he donated the equivalent of his three years’ salary to the school. When Mrs. Kamath died in 2008, she left all their assets to charities, primarily to the professional societies, including the Colour Society, that Professor Kamath had founded.

=== Awards and honors ===
At the Silver Jubilee celebrations of the All India Manufacturers’ Association in 1973, India’s President V. V. Giri honored Professor Kamath with an award for his contributions to chemical engineering.

Professor Kamath’s students have established Professor N. R. Kamath Chair Professorship. Outstanding academic leaders are appointed annually. The goal is to raise the world academic rankings of IIT Bombay from the present 150-200 to the top 20 tier.

In 2012, ICT has instituted the "Professor N. R. Kamath Book Authors’ Award" for ICT faculty, students, and alumni for their textbooks, monographs, or edited volumes on science, technology and management. The award is supported by an endowment from his former students.

Management and Business Review (MBR), a journal for executives and managers, has established a biennial Teck-Hua Ho (National University of Singapore) and N. R. Kamath (IIT Bombay at Mumbai) Award for Research in Engineering and Technology that has benefitted organizations and society. MBR is sponsored by a dozen leading business schools: UCLA Anderson School of Management, China Europe International Business School, City University of Hong Kong, University of Virginia Darden School of Business, Indian School of Business, INSEAD, Samuel Curtis Johnson Graduate School of Management, Robert G. Merrick School of Business, Owen Graduate School of Management, Ross School of Business, Tepper School of Business at Carnegie Mellon University, and the Tuck School of Business at Dartmouth College.

=== Legacy ===
His legacy is that the IITs are today regarded among the top engineering schools in the world. The United States CBS' 60 Minutes newsmagazine described the IITs as "Harvard, MIT, and Princeton put together.” The Business Week magazine published a cover story on the IITs. IIT Bombay at Mumbai ranks as India’s Number 1 university in India in all global and national rankings.

== Personal life ==
NRK met his future Czechoslovakia-born wife Ruzena at an opera in the spring of 1939 in London, and they got married in 1942. Mrs. Kamath, to her credit, not only enthusiastically motivated the young Narayan Kamath to return to India but settled in very well to her new life in Mumbai. They had no children, but thousands of NRK’s students revered her as a mother figure even after he was no more.

== Vision of India ==
NRK explained that the history of technology had taught us that we needed to exploit our resources because that is what India had done in the last 4,000 years and the Western countries had done in the last 400 years. India is rich in national resources. He listed water, chunam, straw, and agriculture waste, among others. He then pointed out that our land and coastline have yet to be explored fully for minerals, oil, and gas. He added that we should revive technologies developed in India before independence.

NRK said that to exploit our resources, India needed scientists a lot more than it needed engineers and that material science should be India's prime focus of research. He also pointed out that in the absence of research in science, our elite would simply follow the Western model in infrastructure, equipment, and consumption, making lives unnecessarily complex for themselves and hopeless for the rest of the population. His insight was profound in view of the current urban congestion, pollution, and continuing poverty.

He was a strong advocate of women’s education but was quite aware of the issues young girls in low-income families faced. He was delighted that IITB, at his time, had some female students and hoped their number would increase.
