= Kalyan Singhal =

Indian American scholar

- Born: 1946; Mhow, India
- Education: (B.TECH.) IIT Bombay (M.B.A) (D.B.A) Kent State University
- Spouse: Jaya Asthana Singhal
- Scientific career
- Fields: Business management, management science, operations management, supply chain management
- Workplaces: University of Baltimore, IIM Bangalore
- Website: www.ubalt.edu/merrick/faculty/alpha-directory-faculty/ksinghal.cfm

Kalyan Singhal is an Indian American engineer and economist. He is the Doris E. and Robert V. McCurdy Distinguished Professor of Management at the Robert G. Merrick School of Business. Singhal has contributed to the fields of innovation, international trade, management sciences, manufacturing operations, operations research, service operations, supply chain management, and sustainable operations. He is the founding editor-in-chief of Production and Operations Management and the founding president of the Production and Operations Management Society. In 2004 Singhal was elected fellow of Institute for Operations Research and the Management Sciences and of the Production and Operations Management Society.

== Biography ==
Singhal was born in 1946 in Mhow, India. He received his doctorate in business from Kent State University and a BTech in Mechanical Engineering from the Indian Institute of Technology Bombay. Singhal is married to Jaya Asthana Singhal, currently the Frank Baker Chair for Research Excellence at the Merrick School of Business, University of Baltimore.

== Career ==
Singhal served on the faculty of the Indian Institute of Management Bangalore from 1974 to 1977, where he founded the Department of Production and Operations Management. Later he served on the faculties of US business schools including those at the University of Arizona, and the University of Houston. He is currently a Distinguished Professor of Management at the Merrick School of Business, University of Baltimore.

In 1989, Singhal founded the Production and Operations Management Society dedicated to the creation and dissemination of knowledge in operations and supply chain management. He also established the society's journal, Production and Operations Management in 1992 and has served as its editor-in-chief since.

Singhal recently established the Management and Business Review, intended to be a rival to the Harvard Business Review, and serves as co-editor in chief along with Wallace Hopp (Ross School of Business) and Christopher Ittner (Wharton School of the University of Pennsylvania), on which occasion Forbes interviewed Singhal. His op-eds have appeared in The Baltimore Sun, India Abroad, The Hindu, and the Hindustan Times, and commentaries have appeared in BusinessWeek, The Economist, and The Washington Post.

== Honors and awards ==
Singhal is an elected fellow of the Institute for Operations Research and the Management Sciences and the Production and Operations Management Society. The latter society has instituted an annual Kalyan Singhal Award of $30,000 to recognize innovations in companies.
