= Decision Sciences Journal of Innovative Education =

- Discipline: Business, management, decision sciences
- Language: English
- Edited by: Chetan Sankar

Publication details
- History: 2003-present
- Publisher: Wiley-Blackwell on behalf of the Decision Sciences Institute
- Frequency: Triannually

Standard abbreviations
- ISO 4: Decis. Sci. J. Innov. Educ.

Indexing
- CODEN: DSJIE
- ISSN: 1540-4595 (print); 1540-4609 (web)
- LCCN: 2002214313
- OCLC no.: 50000127

Links
- Journal homepage; Online access; Online archive

Decision Sciences Journal of Innovative Education is a peer-reviewed academic journal published by Wiley-Blackwell on behalf of the Decision Sciences Institute. The current editor-in-chief is Chetan Sankar (Auburn University). The journal covers all areas related to decision science.
