= Sethi-Skiba point =

Sethi-Skiba points, also known as DNSS points, arise in optimal control problems that exhibit multiple optimal solutions. A Sethi-Skiba point is an indifference point in an optimal control problem such that starting from such a point, the problem has more than one different optimal solutions. A good discussion of such points can be found in Grass et al.

== Definition ==
Of particular interest here are discounted infinite horizon optimal control problems that are autonomous. These problems can be formulated as

$$\max_{u(t)\in \Omega}\int_0^{\infty} e^{-\rho t} \varphi\left(x(t), u(t)\right)dt$$

s.t.

$$\dot{x}(t) = f\left(x(t), u(t)\right), x(0) = x_{0},$$

where $\rho > 0$ is the discount rate, $x(t)$ and $u(t)$ are the state and control variables, respectively, at time $t$, functions $\varphi$ and $f$ are assumed to be continuously differentiable with respect to their arguments and they do not depend explicitly on time $t$, and $\Omega$ is the set of feasible controls and it also is explicitly independent of time $t$. Furthermore, it is assumed that the integral converges for any admissible solution $\left(x(.), u(.)\right)$. In such a problem with one-dimensional state variable $x$, the initial state $x_{0}$ is called a Sethi-Skiba point if the system starting from it exhibits multiple optimal solutions or equilibria. Thus, at least in the neighborhood of $x_0$, the system moves to one equilibrium for $x > x_0$ and to another for $x < x_0$. In this sense, $x_0$ is an indifference point from which the system could move to either of the two equilibria.

For two-dimensional optimal control problems, Grass et al. and Zeiler et al. present examples that exhibit DNSS curves.

Some references on the applications of Sethi-Skiba points are Caulkins et al., Zeiler et al., and Carboni and Russu

== History ==
Suresh P. Sethi identified such indifference points for the first time in 1977. Further, Skiba, Sethi, and Deckert and Nishimura explored these indifference points in economic models. The term DNSS (Deckert, Nishimura, Sethi, Skiba) points, introduced by Grass et al., recognizes (alphabetically) the contributions of these authors. These indifference points have been also referred to as Skiba points or DNS points in earlier literature.

== Example ==
A simple problem exhibiting this behavior is given by $\varphi\left(x,u\right) =xu,$ $f\left(x,u\right) = -x + u,$ and $\Omega = \left[-1, 1\right]$. It is shown in Grass et al. that $x_{0} = 0$ is a Sethi-Skiba point for this problem because the optimal path $x(t)$ can be either $\left(1-e^{-t}\right)$ or $\left(-1+e^{-t}\right)$. Note that for $x_{0} < 0$, the optimal path is $x(t) = -1 + e^{-t\left(x_{0}+1 \right)}$ and for $x_{0} > 0$, the optimal path is $x(t) = 1 + e^{-t\left(x_{0}-1 \right)}$.

== Extensions ==
For further details and extensions, the reader is referred to Grass et al.
