= Neeley School of Business =

Business school of Texas Christian University

Coordinates: 32.708822°N 97.357128°W

- Type: Private School
- Established: 1884
- Parent institution: Texas Christian University
- Dean: Craig Crossland
- Location: Fort Worth, Texas, United States
- Website: neeley.tcu.edu

The Neeley School of Business is the undergraduate and graduate business school at Texas Christian University (TCU), a private university located in Fort Worth, Texas. The Neeley School is fully accredited by the AACSB. The school provides a range of business education programs, including: BBA, Full-time MBA, Professional MBA, Accelerated MBA, Energy MBA, Health Care MBA, Executive MBA, Master of Science in Supply Chain Management, Master of Accounting, and MBA/Ed.D.

== History ==
TCU was founded in 1873 by brothers Addison and Randolph Clark in Thorp Spring, Texas, as AddRan Male and Female College, and the School of Business opened in 1884 as Commercial School, renamed School of Business in 1896, and College of Business in 1901. The Department of Business Administration was established in 1922, and became the School of Business in 1938, the first year to offer a master of business administration. Student organizations included the TCU Chamber of Commerce, begun in 1939, and the Collegiate Business and Professional Women's Club. E. M. Sowell was appointed the first dean in 1944. In 1967, the School of Business was named for M.J. Neeley in honor of his personal service of 25 years on the TCU Board of Trustees and financial contributions to TCU. Applications have risen steadily in recent years. The Neeley School of Business currently makes up one-third of the TCU student population.

== Campus ==
TCU is located in the Dallas-Fort Worth Metroplex, the "Fourth Best Metropolitan Area for Business," according to Forbes magazine. Metroplex corporations participate in Neeley School mentorships, internships, special projects, and hiring. The Metroplex is home to DFW International Airport. The Neeley School has active international connections and study abroad programs.

== Degree programs ==
TCU (as of the 2026-2027 school year) offers seven undergraduate majors: Accounting, Business Information Systems, Entrepreneurship & Innovation, Finance, Management, Marketing, and Supply Chain Management. The Neeley School of Business offers minors as well, such as: Accounting, Business Information Systems, Energy & Business, Finance, General Business, Global Business, and Leadership.

Business school rankings

United States
- Bloomberg MBA: 42
- USNWR MBA: 50

== Student initiatives ==
- Neeley & Associates Consulting - MBA students work on paid projects for national and international businesses, providing hands-on experience for students and quality consultation for the business organizations.
- Neeley Fellows – Undergraduate honors program
- BNSF Neeley Leadership Program – Undergraduate leadership program
- Student Organizations – American Marketing Association, Association for Information Systems, Beta Alpha Psi, Beta Gamma Sigma, Collegiate Entrepreneurs Club (CEO), Delta Sigma Pi, Financial Management Association, Neeley Associates, Society for Human Resource Management, and Students in Free Enterprise
- Neeley Premium Credentials - A personalized professional development program.

== Centers of Study ==
Sales and Customer Insights Center

Tandy Center for Executive Leadership
The Tandy Center for Executive Leadership was founded by the Anne Burnett and Charles D. Tandy Foundation to strengthen American business. The center provides leadership training for major corporations and individuals through executive education, executive coaching, certification classes and a speaker series featuring prominent CEOs.

Neeley Institute for Entrepreneurship and Innovation
Special programs include the TCU Texas Youth Entrepreneur of the Year, Family Business Seminar, Global Student Entrepreneur of the Year, Small Business of the Year and Entrepreneurial Expo. The TCU Collegiate Entrepreneur (TCU CEO) organization is the largest in the U.S.

Center for Supply Chain Innovation
The center hosts the annual Global Supply Chain Conference.

LKCM Center for Financial Studies
The LKCM Center for Financial Studies is named in honor of Luther King Capital Management, an investment advisory firm. The center sponsors the TCU High School Investor Challenge and the Investment Strategies Conference.

== See also ==
- List of United States business school rankings
- List of business schools in the United States
