= Pravin Krishna =

Indian-American economist

- Born: 26 July 1969 (age 57); India
- Occupation: Economist

Academic background
- Education: IIT Bombay (BTech); Columbia University (PhD)
- Doctoral advisor: Jagdish Bhagwati

Academic work
- Institutions: Johns Hopkins University; Brown University; Stanford University The University of Chicago Princeton University

Pravin Krishna (born 26 July 1969) is an American economist and Chung Ju Yung Distinguished Professor of International Economics and Business at the School of Advanced International Studies (SAIS) at Johns Hopkins University. He is a research associate at the National Bureau of Economic Research and serves on the editorial board of the Journal of International Economics. Krishna was previously Professor of Economics at Brown University and has held academic appointments at Princeton University, Stanford University and the University of Chicago.

== Education ==
Krishna holds a PhD degree in Economics from Columbia University and a B.Tech. degree in Engineering from IIT Bombay.

== Bibliography ==
- Trade Blocs: Economics and Politics, Cambridge University Press (2005)
- Trade Blocs: Alternate Analyses of Preferential Trade Agreements, Co-Editor with Jagdish Bhagwati and Arvind Panagariya, MIT Press (1999)
