= Dulal Panda =

Indian cell biologist

- Born: 28 January 1964 (age 62); India
- Education: Bose Institute; University of California, Santa Barbara
- Known for: Studies on microtubule dynamics and FtsZ assembly dynamics
- Awards: 2001 FIC FIRCA Award; 2005 N-BIOS Prize; 2007 SBC P. S. Sharma Memorial Award; 2007 IITB S. C. Bhattacharya Award; 2010 CDRI Drug Research Excellence Award; 2010 DAE-SRC Outstanding Research Investigator Award; 2012 CSIR G. N. Ramachandran Gold Medal
- Scientific career
- Fields: Cell biology
- Workplaces: IIT Bombay

Dulal Panda (born 28 January 1964) is an Indian cell biologist and the chair professor at the department of biosciences and bioengineering of the Indian Institute of Technology, Bombay. Presently, he is the Director of NIPER, SAS Nagar (Mohali). Known for his studies on microtubule dynamics and FtsZ assembly dynamics, Panda is an elected fellow of the Indian Academy of Sciences and the National Academy of Sciences, India. The Department of Biotechnology of the Government of India awarded him the National Bioscience Award for Career Development, one of the highest Indian science awards, for his contributions to biosciences in 2005.

== Biography ==
Born on 28 January 1964, Dulal Panda did his doctoral studies at Bose Institute to earn a PhD in biochemistry in 1994 and subsequently, did his post-doctoral work at the University of California, Santa Barbara during 1998–2000 as a research associate. On his return to India, he joined the Indian Institute of Technology, Bombay in 2000 as an assistant professor at the School of Bioscience and Bioengineering and has been serving the institute since then. During this period, he became an associate professor in 2003 and a professor in 2007, and serves as a chair professor at the School of Bioscience and Bioengineering. In between, he was also associated with the scientific programs in life sciences of the Department of Science and Technology during 2003–04.

Panda resides in Powai, a neighborhood of Mumbai, in Maharashtra.

== Legacy ==
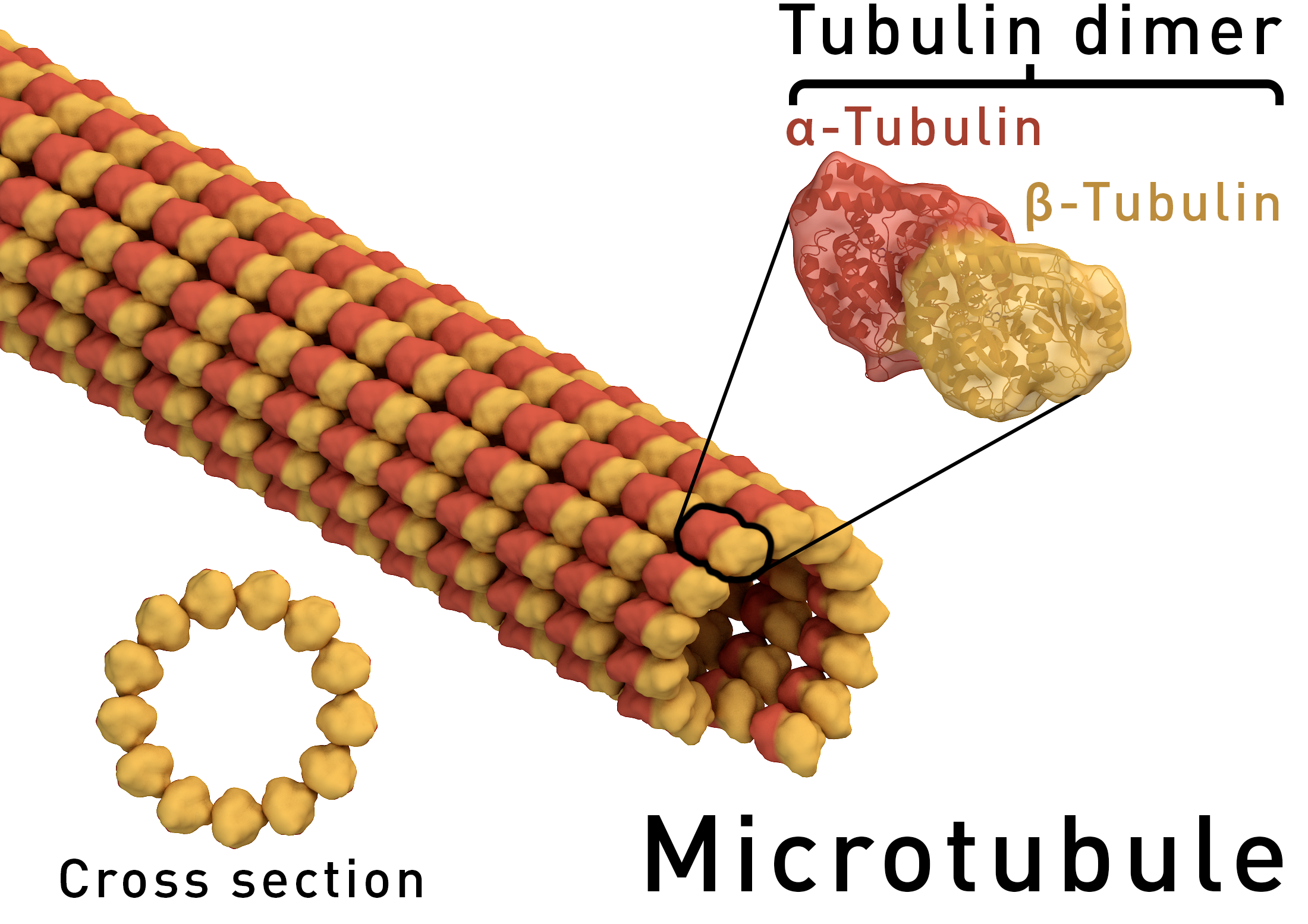
Microtubule structure

Panda's cell biological research covered the fields of eukaryotic and prokaryotic cell division, dynamics of microtubules and FtsZ, chemotherapeutic treatment protocols, development of FtsZ-targeted antibacterial drugs as well as biomolecular spectroscopy. His work on the dynamics of microtubules is known to have assisted in the development of anti-cancer and anti-fungal drugs and the research on FtsZ assembly has contributed to widening the understanding of their polymerization dynamics. He holds one patent for the development of an antibacterial drug and has four other patent applications pending approval. His studies have been documented by way of a number of articles (Note: Please see Selected bibliography section) and the online article repository of the Indian Academy of Sciences has listed 50 of them. Besides, he has contributed chapters to books published by others. He serves as the associate editor of BioMed Central of Springer Nature and was a member of the national committee of the 1st International Conference on Nutraceuticals and Chronic Diseases held in Kochi, Kerala in September 2016.

== Awards and honors ==
Dulal Panda received the Fogarty International Research Collaboration Award (FIRCA) of the John E. Fogarty International Center in 2001 and the Swarnajayathi Fellowship of the Department of Science and Technology in 2004. The Department of Biotechnology of the Government of India awarded him the National Bioscience Award for Career Development, one of the highest Indian science awards in 2005. He was chosen for the P. S. Sharma Memorial Award of the Society of Biological Chemists in 2007, the same year as he was selected as a member of Guha Research Conference. He received the S. C. Bhattacharya Award of IIT Bombay in 2009 and in 2010, he received two awards, the CDRI Award for Excellence in Drug Research of the Central Drug Research Institute and the Outstanding Research Investigator Award of the Science Research Council of the Department of Atomic Energy. The Council of Scientific and Industrial Research honored him with the G. N. Ramachandran Gold Medal in 2012.

Panda, who holds a TATA Innovation Fellowship of the Department of Biotechnology, was elected as a fellow by the National Academy of Sciences, India in 2005. He received the elected fellowship of the Indian Academy of Sciences in 2008.

== Selected bibliography ==
=== Chapters ===
- Leslie Wilson; John J. Correia (Eds.); Bhabhatarak Bhattacharya, Sonia Kapoor Dulal Panda (chapter authors) (3 July 2010). "Fluorescence Spectroscopic Methods to Analyze Drug-tubulin Interactions". Microtubules, in vitro. Academic Press. pp. 9–. ISBN 978-0-08-088858-3.
- Claudio O. Gualerzi; Letizia Brandi; Attilio Fabbretti, Cynthia L. Pon (5 September 2013). Antibiotics: Targets, Mechanisms and Resistance. John Wiley & Sons. pp. 22–. ISBN 978-3-527-65970-8.

=== General articles ===
- Panda, Dulal; Manna, Tapas K (2006). "Dr. Bablu Bhattacharyya: A Journey of Four Decades with Tubulin". Journal of Proteins & Proteomics. 6 (3).

=== Scientific articles ===
- Jaiswal, Richa; Patel, Ronak Y.; Asthana, Jayant; Jindal, Bhavya; Balaji, Petety V.; Panda, Dulal (8 October 2010). "E93R Substitution of Escherichia coli FtsZ Induces Bundling of Protofilaments, Reduces GTPase Activity, and Impairs Bacterial Cytokinesis". Journal of Biological Chemistry. 285 (41): 31796–31805. doi:10.1074/jbc.m110.138719. ISSN 0021-9258. PMC 2951251. PMID 20667825.
- Balakrishna, Maravanji S.; Suresh, D.; Rai, Ankit; Mague, Joel T.; Panda, Dulal (4 October 2010). "Dinuclear Copper(I) Complexes Containing Cyclodiphosphazane Derivatives and Pyridyl Ligands: Synthesis, Structural Studies, and Antiproliferative Activity toward Human Cervical and Breast Cancer Cells". Inorganic Chemistry. 49 (19): 8790–8801. doi:10.1021/ic100944d. ISSN 0020-1669. PMID 20812680.
- Banerjee, Mithu; Singh, Parminder; Panda, Dulal (1 August 2010). "Curcumin suppresses the dynamic instability of microtubules, activates the mitotic checkpoint and induces apoptosis in MCF-7 cells". FEBS Journal. 277 (16): 3437–3448. doi:10.1111/j.1742-4658.2010.07750.x. ISSN 1742-4658. PMID 20646066.

== See also ==
- Cytoskeleton
- Tubulin
