= Decision Sciences Institute =

International professional organization

The Decision Sciences Institute (DSI) is a professional association of university professors, graduate students, and practitioners whose interest lies in the application of quantitative research and qualitative research to the decision problems of individuals, organizations, and society. Many of the members of this academic organization are faculty members in business schools. The DSI currently is hosted in the C.T. Bauer College of Business at the University of Houston.

Members of the institute share their research findings at DSI's annual meeting (DSI's main academic conference), international DSI meetings, or regional conferences. The Decision Sciences Institute also publishes two journals and hosts annual award competitions for contributions to innovation education, the best case study, and best doctoral dissertation. In addition, the Institute offers job placement services, doctoral student and new faculty consortia, and a variety of professional development activities.

== Journals ==
The Decision Sciences Institute publishes two academic journals, Decision Sciences (journal) and Decision Sciences Journal of Innovative Education. Both journals are printed and distributed by Wiley-Blackwell and have subscriptions totaling over 5,000. In addition, the publication Decision Line, includes a wide range of practical and educational feature columns (international studies, ecommerce, academic research, production/operations management issues, information technology, doctoral studies, and classroom instruction), as well as news items that inform the membership of past, present, and future events.

== Regions ==
There are currently eight (8) regions. There are five regions in the United States and four outside the U.S. (Europe, Mexico, Asia-Pacific, and the Indian subcontinent). The regions operate independently within the institute. Each region elects its own officers and one representative who serves on the institute’s board of directors.

== Location ==
DSI's home office is located in Houston, Texas where it receives support from the Bauer College of Business at the University of Houston. Dennis E. Grawoig founded the organization in 1968 and served as its first president for two years and as its executive director until 1986. The executive director of the institute if Vivian Landrum.

== History ==
In November 1968, a small group of faculty members met in Atlanta, Georgia to propose an academic society that would encourage interdisciplinary (now cross-disciplinary) participation in the new field of decision sciences.

The first annual meeting of the American Institute for Decision Sciences (AIDS) was held in New Orleans in 1969. About 100 charter members were in attendance.

The institute's first journal, Decision Sciences, was first published in 1970. In 2003, DSI began publishing a second journal, the Decision Sciences Journal of Innovative Education (DSJIE). DSJIE publishes research on teaching and learning issues.

In 1986, the name of the organization was changed to the Decision Sciences Institute "once the name AIDS became linked in the public's mind with a newly emerging disease."

Since 1986, Carol Latta served as the institute's executive director. She was made a Fellow of DSI in 2003. Vivian Landrum took over the role of Executive Director in October of 2016.

DSI is one of a handful of organizations that address solving real-world business problems. One way in which DSI distinguishes itself from similar organizations is in addressing educational issues including curriculum, pedagogy, and careers.

Attendance at the annual meetings is now in the range of 1300 to 1400 attendees. The institute is an independent non-profit educational organization.

In order to further research in the decision sciences, the membership of the Decision Sciences Institute has been asked to participate in studies and surveys and the research papers published in DSI conference proceedings have been studied.

In March 2008, the Decision Sciences Institute Wikipedia entry was developed.

The honor of Fellow is occasionally awarded to DSI members for outstanding contributions in the field of decision sciences in at least two (2) of the following: research and scholarship, teaching and/or administration, and service to the Decision Sciences Institute.

== Presidents ==
Presidents of DSI have included:

2016–2017 Funda Sahin, University of Houston
2015–2016 Morgan Swink, Texas Christian University
2014–2015 Marc J. Schniederjans, University of Nebraska-Lincoln
2013–2014 Maling Ebrahimpour, University of South Florida-St. Petersburg
2012–2013 E. Powell Robinson, Jr., Texas A&M University
2011–2012 Krishna S. Dhir, Berry College
2010–2011 G. Keong Leong, University of Nevada-Las Vegas
2009–2010 Ram Narasimhan, Michigan State University
2008–2009 Norma J. Harrison, China Europe International Business School (CEIBS)
2007–2008 Kenneth E. Kendall, Rutgers University
2006–2007 Mark M. Davis, Bentley College
2005–2006 Thomas E. Callarman, China Europe International Business School (CEIBS)
2004–2005 Gary L. Ragatz, Michigan State University
2003–2004 Barbara B. Flynn, Wake Forest University
2002–2003 Thomas W. Jones, University of Arkansas-Fayetteville
2001–2002 F. Robert Jacobs, Indiana University-Bloomington
2000–2001 Michael J. Showalter, Florida State University
1999–2000 Lee J. Krajewski, University of Notre Dame
1998–1999 Terry R. Rakes, Virginia Tech
1997–1998 James R. Evans, University of Cincinnati
1996–1997 Betty J. Whitten, University of Georgia
1995–1996 John C. Anderson, University of Minnesota-Twin Cities
1994–1995 K. Roscoe Davis, University of Georgia
1993–1994 Larry P. Ritzman, Boston College
1992–1993 William C. Perkins, Indiana University-Bloomington
1991–1992 Robert E. Markland, University of South Carolina
1990–1991 Ronald J. Ebert, University of Missouri-Columbia
1989–1990 Bernard W. Taylor, III, Virginia Tech
1988–1989 William L. Berry, Ohio State University
1987–1988 James M. Clapper, Aladdin TempRite
1986–1987 William R. Darden, Deceased
1985–1986 Harvey J. Brightman, Georgia State University
1984–1985 Sang M. Lee, University of Nebraska-Lincoln
1983–1984 Laurence J. Moore, Virginia Tech
1982–1983 Linda G. Sprague, China Europe International Business School (CEIB)
1981–1982 Norman L. Chervany, University of Minnesota-Twin Cities
1979–1981 D. Clay Whybark, University of North Carolina-Charlotte
1978–1979 John Neter, University of Georgia
1977–1978 Charles P. Bonini, Stanford University
1976–1977 Lawrence L. Schkade, University of Texas-Arlington
1975–1976 Kenneth P. Uhl, Deceased
1974–1975 Albert J. Simone, Rochester Institute of Technology
1973–1974 Gene K. Groff, Georgia State University
1972–1973 Rodger D. Collons, Drexel University
1971–1972 George W. Summers, Deceased
1969–1971 Dennis E. Grawoig, Deceased

== Annual meetings ==
The Decision Sciences Institute offers an annual meeting open to anyone who wants to participate in the dissemination of knowledge concerning the decision sciences.

DSI also sponsors subgroups referred to as regions. Each of the following regions has their own constitution and bylaws and hold regular meetings: Asia-Pacific, European, Indian subcontinent, Mexico, Midwest U.S., Northeast U.S., Southeast U.S., Southwest U.S., and Western U.S.

== See also ==
- Academy of Management
- APICS The Association for Operations Management
- Association for Computing Machinery
- Association for Information Systems
- Association of Information Technology Professionals
- Institute for Operations Research and the Management Sciences
- International Federation for Information Processing
