= Production and Operations Management Society =

Professional society for academics

- Abbreviation: POMS
- Formation: 1989; 37 years ago
- Founders: Kalyan Singhal with three hundred professors and executives
- Founded at: Merrick School of Business at the University of Baltimore
- Type: Nonprofit Society
- Legal status: Professional association
- Purpose: Improved understanding and practice of production and operations management (POM)
- Location: United States
- Region served: Worldwide
- Services: Journals and conferences
- President: Subodha Kumar
- Publication: Production and Operations Management Journal
- Website: www.poms.org

The Production and Operations Management Society (POMS) is an international professional society for academics and practitioners with interests in production operations, operations management, and supply chain management. The society was established in 1989 by Kalyan Singhal, of Merrick School of Business at the University of Baltimore, in collaboration with three hundred professionals from the operations management field.

POMS is guided by Board Members made up of three Past Presidents, several Vice Presidents (e.g., Education, Finance, Meetings, Member Activities, Colleges, Publications, Communications, Industry, Americas, Africa & Middle East, Europe, and Australasia), a Secretary, and several at-large Board Members. POMS is also led by a Director of Strategic Planning, an Executive Director, Associate Directors (Global Outreach, Information Technology Services), a Web Editor, and a Social Media Coordinator.

The mission of POMS is to create, extend, and disseminate knowledge in the field of production and operations management.

== History ==
The society was established in 1989 by Kalyan Singhal, of Merrick School of Business at the University of Baltimore, in collaboration with three hundred professionals from the operations management field.

Since 1990, the POMS society has annually held national conferences focused on academic and practitioner research presentations in the operations management discipline. POMS also sponsors conferences held by its Colleges, joint conferences with the European operations management society EUROMA, and international conferences. The society maintains the website www.pomsmeetings.org as a current and historical repository of information about these conferences.

== POMS activities ==
=== Publications ===
Production and Operations Management (POM) is the flagship journal of the society. POM is a scientific peer-review journal that publishes research from areas covering operations management, supply chain management, and business analytics. The journal is published by Wiley. The editor-in-chief for the journal is Kalyan Singhal. Subodha Kumar is the deputy editor-in-chief. POM is included among several lists of top journals for the Operations Management and Supply Chain Management fields, including by the UT Dallas Top 100 Business School Research Rankings, the Financial Times list, and other lists. POM is included among the top eight operations management and supply chain management journals used to calculate The SCM Journal List, being considered as a primarily analytically-focused journal.

POMS Chronicle is the official newsletter of the society and is a bi-annual publication.

=== Conferences ===
The annual POMS conference is generally held in the early May. The most recent conference (2019 POMS Annual Conference) was held in Washington D.C. It was attended by more than 1900 professionals from around the world. In addition to the Annual conferences, several international conferences are held every year around the world. In 2019, international conferences were held in Brighton (UK), Tianjin University (China), Mumbai (India), and Hong Kong.

=== Chapters ===
POMS society has chapters in the United States, Beijing, India, Hong Kong, Latin America, Caribbean, and Taiwan.

=== Awards ===
POMS recognizes scholars and practitioners from POM field by bestowing awards in various accomplishments. They include:

- POMS Fellows Award
- Martin K. Starr Excellence in Production and Operations Management Practice Award
- Sushil K. Gupta Distinguished POMS Service Award
- Paul Kleindorfer Award
- Wickham Skinner Award
- Emerging Economies Doctoral Student Award
- Distinguished Lecturer Award

== Presidents ==
Presidents of POMS have included:

- 2024 Subodha Kumar
- 2023 Gerard (Jerry) Burke
- 2022 Nagesh Murthy
- 2021 Zuo-Jun 'Max' Shen
- 2020 Chelliah Sriskandarajah
- 2019 Nada Sanders
- 2018 J. George Shanthikumar
- 2017 Manoj Malhotra
- 2016 Edward Anderson
- 2015 Asoo J. Vakharia
- 2014 Asoo J. Vakharia
- 2013 Christopher S. Tang
- 2012 Suresh Sethi
- 2011 Luk Van Wassenhove
- 2010 Marshall Fisher
- 2009 Wally Hopp
- 2008 Cheryl Gaimon
- 2007 Jatinder 'Jeet' Gupta
- 2006 Hau Lee
- 2005 Kasra Ferdows
- 2004 Gabriel Bitran
- 2003 Aleda Roth
- 2002 Aleda Roth
- 2001 Robert Hayes
- 2000 Robert Hayes
- 1999 John Buzacott
- 1998 Wickham Skinner
- 1997 Roger Schmenner
- 1996 Sushil Gupta
- 1995 Martin Starr
- 1994 Kalyan Singhal
- 1993 Kalyan Singhal
- 1992 Kalyan Singhal
- 1991 Kalyan Singhal

== Related professional societies ==
- Academy of Management
- Association for Supply Chain Management
- Institute for Operations Research and the Management Sciences
- Institute for Supply Management
