= Sadanand Joshi =

Sadanand D. Joshi is the president of Joshi Technologies International, Inc. (JTI) and a petroleum engineer, he contributed in developing horizontal well technology to produce crude oil and natural gas. He was also a distinguished lecturer for the Society of Petroleum Engineers in 1995-1996. He was listed by Oil and Gas Investor magazine as one of the 100 most influential people of the petroleum century.

== Biography ==
He earned his Bachelor's degree in mechanical engineering from Walchand College of Engineering, and earned his M.Tech. in 1975 in Mechanical Engineering from the Indian Institute of Technology Bombay (IIT Bombay). He earned a Ph.D. in mechanical engineering from Iowa State University (ISU) in 1978.

He is well known in the Oil & Gas industry for his technical papers and best selling book on the subject, which was published by PennWell in 1991. By virtue of his extensive scholarship in this area, he has gained numerous accolades, including being designated as a Distinguished Lecturer by the Society of Petroleum Engineers for the 1995-1996 season. At the beginning of 2000, Joshi was honored by the "Oil & Gas Investor" and was listed along with many well known names as one of the 100 Most Influential People in the Petroleum Century.

Joshi founded JTI in 1988 after a successful nine-year tenure at Phillips Petroleum Company in Bartlesville, Oklahoma. Drawing on his expertise in the field of horizontal well technology, he has guided the company to its current position, as both an international consulting and E&P company. In addition to his role as the CEO of the company, Joshi's primary responsibilities include international project origination/negotiation and strategic planning.

In March 2003, Joshi was named as a distinguished Alumnus by his alma mater, IIT Bombay, India. In 2012, because of his outstanding engineering contribution to the oil industry he received the Anson Marston Medal from his alma mater, ISU.
