= Lawrence Schkade =

American information systems and management science researcher (1930–2017)

Lawrence L. Schkade (1930–2017) was an American information systems and management science researcher.

Schkade was a native of Port Arthur, Texas, who earned his doctorate at Louisiana State University. He taught at the University of Texas at Austin and the University of North Texas before joining the University of Texas at Arlington. At UTA, he was Ashbel Smith Professor of Information Systems and Management Sciences, later held the Jenkins Garrett Professorship in Information Systems and Operations Management, and also served as dean of the College of Business Administration. Schkade was granted emeritus status in October 2004. He died on 25 November 2017, aged 87.
