= Subodha Kumar =

Indian-born American academic

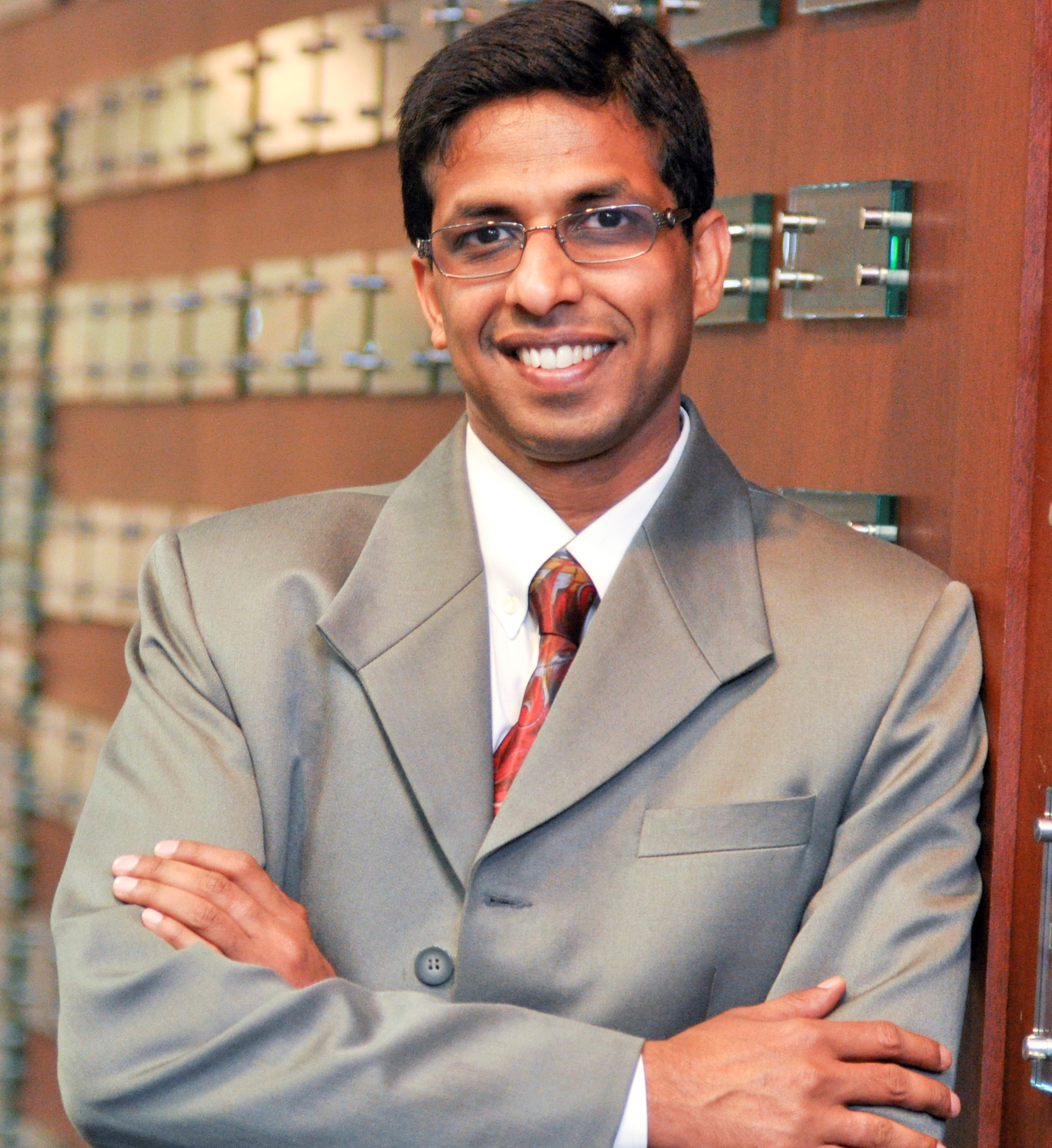
- Subodha Kumar
- Education: (B.TECH.) BIT Sindri (M.TECH.) IIT Kanpur (M.B.A) (PhD) UT Dallas
- Awards: INFORMS Information Systems Society (ISS) Distinguished Fellow Award (2023); Production and Operations Management Society (POMS) Fellow (2019)
- Scientific career
- Workplaces: University of Washington; Texas A&M University; Temple University
- Website: sites.temple.edu/subodha/

Subodha Kumar is an Indian American business school researcher and educator and a board member. He is known for his work on web advertising, social media, healthcare, analytics, and disruptive technologies. He is the Paul R. Anderson Distinguished Chair Professor of Statistics, Operations, and Data Science (with a secondary appointment in Information Systems) at the Fox School of Business, Temple University. He founded the Center for Business Analytics and Disruptive Technologies at Temple University and directs the Ph.D. Program in Operations and Supply Chain Management.

Subodha is the Executive Director and Past President of Production and Operations Management Society (POMS) and the Co-Editor-in-Chief for the Production and Operations Management journal, one of the topmost journals in the field of operations and supply chain management. He is also the Co-Editor-in-Chief of the Management and Business Review journal, which has been referred to as a rival to the Harvard Business Review by Forbes.

Subodha has (co)-authored two books in the areas of web analytics - Optimization Issues in Web and Mobile Advertising: Past and Future Trends Social Media Analytics and Practical Applications: The Change to the Competition Landscape.

Kumar has received several awards for research, teaching, and service to the academic community. He has been invited by media to provide expert opinion on matters related to social media, marketing, and business management.

== Education and Academic Career ==
Subodha was born in India where he received his Bachelor of Mechanical Engineering from BIT Sindri, India. He later went on to get his masters in Industrial and Management Engineering from Indian Institute of Technology Kanpur. He received his MBA and PhD (2001) in Management Sciences and Information Systems from University of Texas, Dallas. Kumar started his academic career as an Assistant Professor of Information Systems at Foster School of Business, University of Washington. He later joined Mays Business School at Texas A&M University in 2009, where he held Mays Research Fellow (2012), Shelley and Joe Tortorice '70 Faculty Research Fellow (2012 – 2013), and Carol and G. David Van Houten, Jr. '71 Professorship (2013 – 2017).

== Patent and Writing ==
Kumar holds a patent (United States Patent # 6,556,893, approved on April 29, 2003) on “Robotic System Control.”

=== Books ===
Subodha is the author of Optimization Issues in Web and Mobile Advertising: Past and Future Trends, which summarizes the state-of-the-art research on web and mobile advertising. He is also a co-author of Social Media Analytics and Practical Applications: The Change to the Competition Landscape, which illustrates how social media analytics can help firms build transformational strategies and cope with the challenges of social media technology.

=== Journal and refereed conference publications ===
Subodha has published more than 120 papers in academic journals and more than 175 peer-reviewed conference proceedings.

=== Case Studies and Book Chapters ===
Subodha has co-authored several business-school case studies in the domain of operations, supply chain management, and information systems. He has also co-authored multiple book chapters.

== Editorial activity and board member ==
Subodha holds and has held several editorial positions at academic and practitioner journals including Co-Editor-in-Chief for Production and Operations Management and Management and Business Review. He is the Past-President and Executive Director of Production and Operations Management Society (POMS), and a board member of Insightzz, Journal of Blockchain Research, Srini Raju Centre for IT and The Networked Economy, Indian School of Business (ISB), and ISB Institute of Data Science. In addition, Subodha is the faculty area advisor of operations-economics interface at the Indian Institute of Management, Udaipur, advisory council member of the INFORMS Service Science Section, and executive director of the Production and Operations Management Society. He has also been a member of the Heal Advisory Board.

== Honors and awards ==
Kumar has received several honors for his scholarship and service to the academic society. For example, he received the INFORMS Information Systems Society (ISS) Distinguished Fellow Award, which is considered to be the highest recognition of INFORMS ISS. He was also elected to be a Production and Operations Management Society Fellow, which is considered to be Production and Operations Management Society’s highest recognition.

To recognize Subodha's work, the Management and Business Review has instituted “The Subodha Kumar and Geoffrey G. Parker Award for Research on Digital Transformation.” In addition, Subodha was awarded the Sushil K. Gupta Production and Operations Management Society (POMS) Distinguished Service Award for his service to the academic society.

Subodha has also received numerous teaching awards. Most notably, he received the Association of Former Students University Level Distinguished Achievement Award in Teaching, Texas A&M University, 2016. This award is among the most prestigious awards at Texas A&M University. Subodha was also selected as the 'Professor of the Year' for Core Courses by the ISB PGP Classes of 2021, 2022, and 2023, Hyderabad Campus, Indian School of Business.

Subodha has been ranked #1 worldwide in terms of publications in the UTD list of 24 leading business journals in 2021-2025 and 2017-2021. He has also been ranked #1 worldwide in terms of publications in Information Systems Research in 2015-2018 and 2016-2019. Subodha's Erdős Number is 3 (see the List of people by Erdős number).
