= P. P. Parikh =

Indian mechanical engineer

Pravina Pravin Parikh (1941–2023, published as P. P. Parikh) was an Indian mechanical engineer specializing in internal combustion engines and alternative fuels, and especially known for her unified method for estimating the higher heating value of a fuel from its composition. Another of her research interests was the status of women in engineering.

== Life, education, and career ==
Parikh was born on January 14, 1941. She was an undergraduate in the Victoria Jubilee Technical Institute of the University of Bombay, and received a master's degree and Ph.D. from IIT Bombay.

She became a faculty member in the Department of Mechanical Engineering at IIT Bombay in 1963, and was promoted to professor in 1984. After retiring as professor emerita, she died on March 14, 2023.

== Recognition ==
Parikh was a member of the Indian National Academy of Engineering, elected in 1990.
