= Anil Kamath =

American computer scientist

- Born: 29 December 1967 (age 58); Bombay, India
- Education: IIT Bombay, Stanford University
- Occupations: Web and technology entrepreneur
- Known for: Efficient Frontier (company)

Anil Kamath is a web and technology entrepreneur. He is the founder of eBoodle.com and of Efficient Frontier. Kamath holds the patent on use of modern portfolio theory to the field of online advertising. He is on the board of Commerce.com (Nasdaq: CMRC) formerly known as BigCommerce.

== Personal life and education ==
Originally from Bombay, India, Kamath has a PhD in Computer Science from Stanford University and a Bachelor of Technology in Computer Science from IIT Bombay. He completed his schooling from St. Pauls High School Dadar, Bombay and his junior college education from D.G. Ruparel College, Bombay.

== Career ==
Kamath worked at Bell Labs and did his PhD in the area of Mathematical optimization. Kamath used his PhD work in the area of optimization to build quantitative models for program trading at the hedge fund of D. E. Shaw & Co. Kamath later started Efficient Frontier (company) and applied the same portfolio optimization techniques to the area of online advertising. Kamath headed the algorithms and optimization work at Efficient Frontier until its acquisition by Adobe Systems. At Adobe, Anil Kamath ran the data science and AI group that built the AI powered capabilities that are embedded throughout Adobe Experience cloud. He was also responsible for Adobe's data science collaborations with universities and Adobe's digital marketing research awards program. More recently, he worked on generative AI solutions designed to streamline and optimize the enterprise content supply chain, with the release of Adobe GenStudio for performance marketing. In July 2025, Kamath was appointed to the Board of Directors of BigCommerce, an open SaaS ecommerce platform.

Before Efficient Frontier, Kamath founded eBoodle.com, an ecommerce company providing comparison shopping and digital wallet services, that was acquired by Bizrate (Shopzilla). At Bizrate, Kamath developed a contextual advertising product.
