= Hemchandra Kekre =

Indian computer scientist

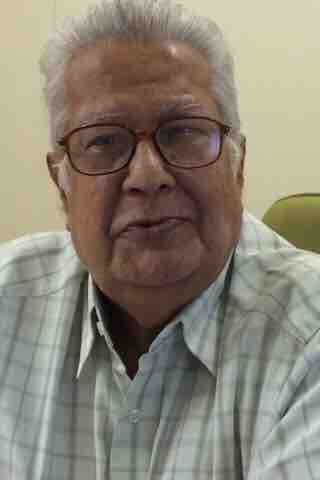
- Born: 4 April 1935; Murtijapur, Maharashtra, India
- Died: 5 November 2014 (aged 79)
- Occupations: professor, researcher
- Years active: 1962–2014
- Title: Professor of Computer Science
- Spouse: Varsha Kekre
- Children: Vivek, Amol and Shilpa

Academic background
- Education: B.E. (Hons) in Telecommunications engineering; MTech in Electrical engineering; M.S.Engg in Electrical engineering; PhD in Electrical Engineering

Academic work
- Discipline: Computer Scientist
- Institutions: Indian Institute of Technology Bombay; Thadomal Shahani Engineering College
- Notable works: Kekre Wavelet Transform; Kekre's hybrid wavelet transform technique; Kekre's fast codebook generation; Kekre's LUV color space

Hemchandra Baburao Kekre (4 April 1935 – 5 November 2014) was a professor, author, and head of the Computer Science Department at the Indian Institute of Technology Bombay. Kekre was among the initial professors who started the computer science department at IIT Mumbai.

== Biography ==
=== Early life and education ===
Hemchandra Kekre was born in India on 4 April 1935 to Mrinalini Kekre, and Baburao Kekre.

Kekre graduated with degrees including: B.E. (Hons) in Telecommunications engineering from Jabalpur Engineering College, MTech in Electrical engineering from the Indian Institute of Technology Bombay, M.S.Engg in (Electrical engineering) from the University of Ottawa, and lastly a PhD in Electrical Engineering from IIT Mumbai.

Kekre moved from the electrical department to the computer science department 1970. Kekre was head of the Computer Science department between 1978 and 1984. Kekre retired from IIT Mumbai in 1995, and joined Thadomal Shahani Engineering College in Mumbai as a Professor of Computer Science, Vice Principal, and Head of Department of Computer Science. In 2008 Kekre joined Mukesh Patel School of Technology Management & Engineering (MPSTME) as a Senior Professor of Computer Science. Kekre worked in MPSTME until his death.

== Academic works ==
Kekre is named after several transformations, these include: Kekre wavelet transform,

Kekre's hybrid wavelet transform technique,[4] Kekre's fast codebook generation[5] and Kekre's LUV color space.[6]
