= N. K. Naik =

Indian aerospace engineer (born 1944)

Dr.Niranjan Krishna Naik
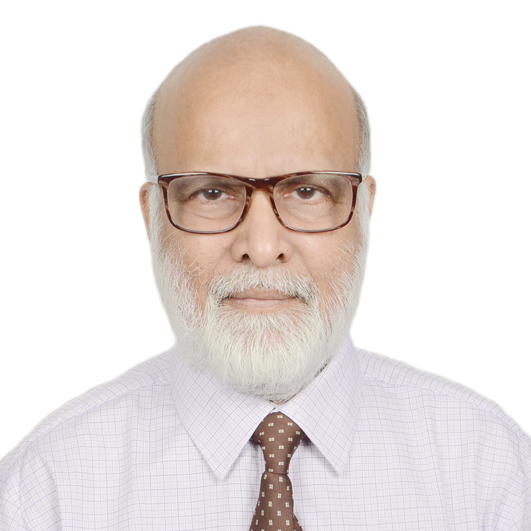
- Born: 1944 (age 81–82); Agragone, Ankola, Uttara Kannada, Karnataka, India
- Education: IIT Bombay
- Known for: Studies on Polymer Matrix Composites, Textile Composites and Ballistic Impact
- Awards: 1992-93 IE(I) research award; 2006 IITB: H H Mathur excellence in research award; 2008 AeSI excellence in education award; 2013 LALA excellence in teaching award
- Scientific career
- Fields: Polymer Matrix Composites, Textile Composites, Ballistic Impact
- Workplaces: IIT Bombay

Niranjan Krishna Naik (born 1944) is an Indian aerospace engineer and Professor Emeritus at Indian Institute of Technology Bombay. He is known for his research work on thermomechanical behavior of textile composites and ballistic impact, low velocity impact, fatigue and fracture of composites. His special interest is also on science and technology of aircraft production. Major awards and recognitions conferred to him are: Fellowship of the National Academy of Sciences, India (2004); Fellowship of the Indian National Academy of Engineering (2005); Professor H. H. Mathur Award for "Excellence in Research in Applied Sciences 2006" by IIT Bombay; "Excellence in Aerospace Education Award 2008" by the Aeronautical Society of India; Aerospace Engineering Division Gold Medal of the Institution of Engineers (India) for the year 1992-93 for his research on polymer matrix composites and "Shri Hotchand M. Lala and Shrimati Jamuna H. Lala Excellence in Teaching Award, 2013" by IIT Bombay.

== Biography ==
Naik was born in Agragone, Ankola Uttara Kannada. With 42 years of experience as a faculty in Aerospace Engineering Department, he has made major contributions to teaching, research and development at IIT Bombay. Currently, he is Professor Emeritus. He is B. E. in Mechanical Engineering from Engineering College, Gulbarga and M.Tech. and Ph.D. from IIT Bombay. The discipline "Polymer Matrix Composites" was evolving and attracting the attention of engineers and scientists about 4 decades ago. That was the time when Naik actively involved in composites research at IIT Bombay. His main fields of research are: 2D / 3D textile composites; ballistic impact / low velocity impact and fatigue and fracture of composites; high strain rate behavior of materials and hybrid composites.

For multi-directional and out-of-plane loading cases, textile composites are widely used as high performance structural materials. Considering the importance of this subject, many investigations are being carried out to understand the behavior of textile composites under different loading conditions during the last four decades. Naik is one of the researchers on this subject and contributed significantly to the textile composites research.

He has presented analytical methods to the scientific community for elastic and thermal analysis of different 2D / 3D textile composites. He has also presented analytical methods for the failure analysis under different loading conditions. His other major contributions are the development of new and efficient methods for the analysis of composite structures under low velocity impact, ballistic impact and fatigue loading.

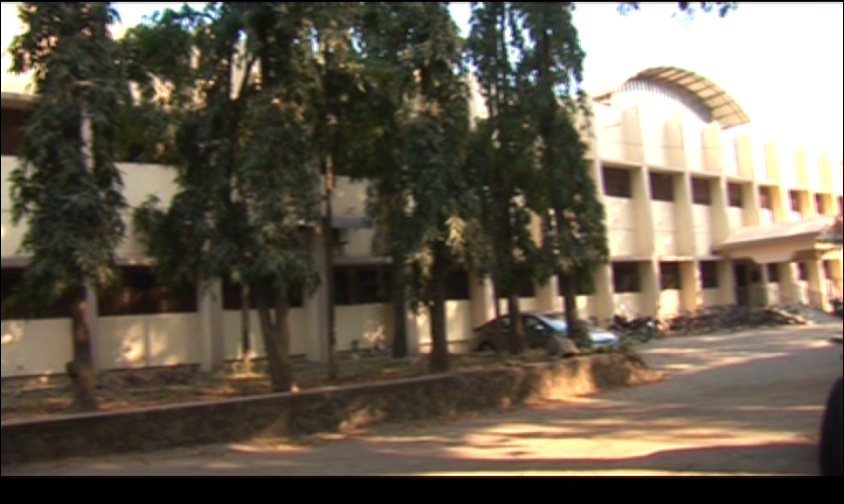
Aerospace Engineering Department, IIT Bombay

His research papers have been published in many archival journals. He has written a book on "Woven Fabric Composites" published by Technomic, USA. He has also contributed chapters to the books published by Blackie Academic and Professional, London; Marcel Dekker, Inc., New York and Woodhead Publishing Limited, Cambridge, U.K.

Naik's research publications are well cited in literature. It is evident from Web of Science and Scopus. He has completed several sponsored and industrial projects of national importance. He has interacted with several national and international organizations. In recognition of his contributions, many research and education awards have been conferred upon him.

Naik was on the editorial board of The Journal of Strain Analysis for Engineering Design, published by Professional Engineering Publishing Limited, London for six years. Indian patent with invention title "Strength Enhancing Insert Assemblies" is granted to him. Application number is 496/MUM/2004. Patent number is 211354. United States Patent with invention title "Strength Enhancing Insert Assemblies" is also granted to him. Patent number is US 8,640,428 B2. Inventors: N. K. Naik and Nageswara Rao Ganji.

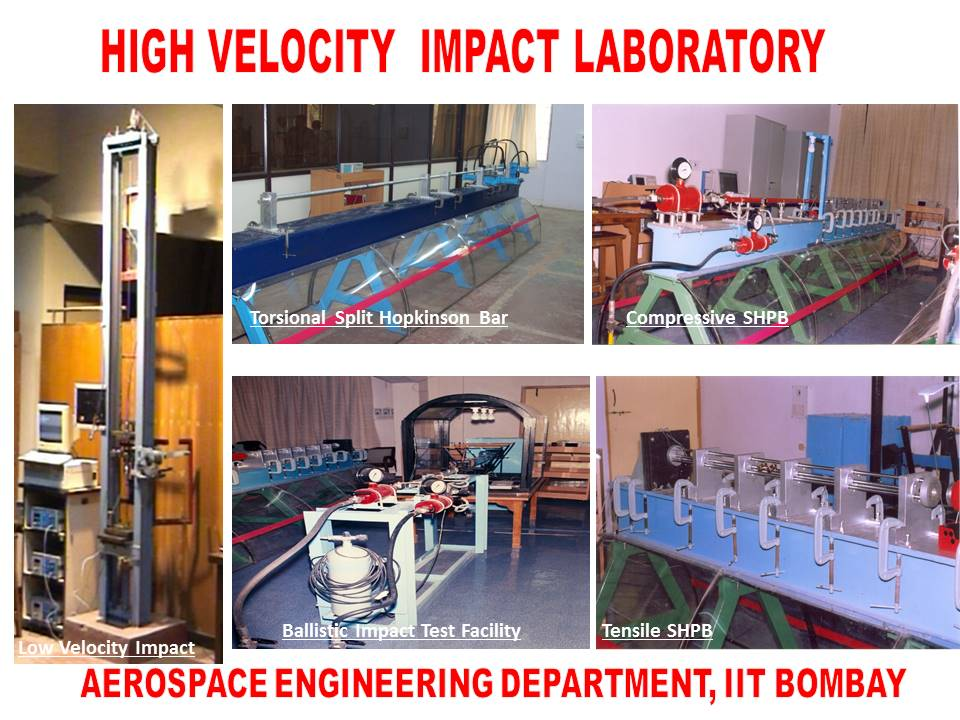
High Velocity Impact Laboratory, IIT Bombay

Aircraft Production and High Velocity Impact laboratories at Aerospace Engineering Department are outcome of efforts of Naik.

Naik was Head of Aerospace Engineering Department during January 2002 – December 2004. He has provided services to Advisory Boards of many International Conferences. He has also provided services towards referring many journal publications. He is a fellow / member of many professional societies. Naik was on the Board of Hindustan Aeronautics Limited (HAL) as an Independent Director during November 2009 – November 2012.

Naik was one of the key persons in National Center for Aerospace Innovation and Research (NCAIR) and participated in setting up objectives and goals of NCAIR.

Naik was born in Agragon (Agragone), Ankola Taluka, Uttara Kannada District, Karnataka State in 1944. His early education was at Primary School, Agragone; Anandashram High School, Bankikodla and Dr. A. V. Baliga College, Kumta.

== Awards, fellowships and honors ==
- Aerospace Engineering Division Gold Medal of the Institution of Engineers (India) for 1992-93
- Fellow of the National Academy of Sciences, India 2004
- Fellow of the Indian National Academy of Engineering 2005
- Professor H. H. Mathur award for Excellence in Research in Applied Sciences 2006 (Indian Institute of Technology Bombay)
- Excellence in Aerospace Education Award 2008 (The Aeronautical Society of India)
- Shri Hotchand M. Lala and Shrimati Jamuna H. Lala Excellence in Teaching Award, 2013 (Indian Institute of Technology Bombay)

Professional Society Affiliations: Fellow of the Aeronautical Society of India (F-596); Fellow of the Institution of Engineers (India), Aerospace Engineering Division (F/100972/5); Life Member of the Indian Society of Theoretical and Applied Mechanics (L/241); Life Member of the Indian Society of Mechanical Engineers (L 150/468)

On the Editorial Board: The Journal of Strain Analysis for Engineering Design, Published by Professional Engineering Publishing Limited, London, 2009 – 2014; Guest Editor for a special issue on High Velocity Impact Behavior of Composites, Volume 47, Issue 7, October 2012

India – Japan Bi-national Seminars: India-Japan Bi-national Seminars on Manufacturing Science of Advanced Composite Materials; The seminar was sponsored by Japan Society for Promotion of Sciences (JSPS) and Department of Science and Technology (DST), India; Indian Team Leader and Seminar Organizer: 2001 – 2005; Indian Team Delegate: 1998 – 2000

ResearchGate: Score is higher than 97.5% of ResearchGate members, RG Score 44.56

Google Scholar: h-index 40, i10-index 87

== Selected bibliography and books authored ==
- Hiremath Chandrashekhar P., K. Senthilnathan, N. K. Naik, Anirban Guha and Asim Tewari. 2018. Microstructural damage based modeling of thermal conductivity of cyclically loaded CFRP, Composites Science and Technology, 154: 37–44, https://doi.org/10.1016/j.compscitech.2017.11.011
- Muthukumar M., J. Prasath, S. Sathish, G. Ravikumar, Y. M. Desai and N. K. Naik. 2017. 3D layer-to-layer orthogonal interlock woven composites under monotonic loading: Multiscale modeling, Journal of Reinforced Plastics and Composites, 36 (17): 1263–1285,DOI 10.1177/0731684417706555
- Pandya Kedar S., Ch. V. Sesha Kumar, N. S. Nair, P. S. Patil and N. K. Naik. 2015. Analytical and experimental studies on ballistic impact behavior of 2D woven fabric composites, International Journal of Damage Mechanics, 24:471-511. DOI: 10.1177/1056789514531440
- Pandya Kedar S. and N. K. Naik. 2015. Analytical and experimental studies on ballistic impact behavior of carbon nanotube dispersed resin, International Journal of Impact Engineering, 76: 49–59. https://doi.org/10.1016/j.ijimpeng.2014.09.003
- Naik, N.K., Kedar S. Pandya, Jayaram R. Pothnis and Tamrat Abishu Gelu. 2014. Revisiting Kolsky bar data evaluation method, Composite Structures, 111: 446–452. https://dx.doi.org/10.1016/j.compstruct.2014.01.030
- Naik, N.K, M. Sirisha and A. Inani. 2014. Permeability characterization of polymer matrix composites by RTM / VARTM, Progress in Aerospace Sciences, 65: 22–40. https://dx.doi.org/10.1016/j.paerosci.2013.09.002
- Naik, N.K., Santosh Kumar, D. Ratnaveer, M. Joshi and K. Akella. 2013. An energy-based model for ballistic impact analysis of ceramic-composite armors, International Journal of Damage Mechanics, 22 (2):145–187, DOI: 10.1177/1056789511435346
- Jayaprakash, K., Y.M. Desai and N.K. Naik. 2013. Fatigue behavior of [0n/90n]s composite cantilever beam under tip impulse loading, Composite Structures, 99: 255–263, https://doi.org/10.1016/j.compstruct.2012.12.009
- Satapathy, M.R., B.G. Vinayak, K. Jayaprakash and N.K. Naik. 2013. Fatigue behavior of laminated composites with a circular hole under in-plane multiaxial loading, Materials and Design, 51: 347–356, https://doi.org/10.1016/j.matdes.2013.04.040
- Naik, N.K. 2012. Guest Editorial: Special issue on high velocity impact behavior of composites, Journal of Strain Analysis for Engineering Design, 47 (7): 395, DOI: 10.1177/0309324712461887
- Naik, N.K., R. Goel and M.D. Kulkarni. 2008. Stress wave attenuation in ceramic plates, Journal of Applied Physics, 103 (10), art. no. 103504, https://doi.org/10.1063/1.2921971
- Naik, N.K., Y. Chandrasekher and S. Meduri. 2000. Damage in woven fabric composites subjected to low velocity impact, Composites Science and Technology, 60:731-744.
- Naik, N.K. and V.K. Ganesh. 1996. Failure behavior of plain weave fabric laminates under on-axis uniaxial tensile loading: II - analytical predictions, Journal of Composite Materials, 30:1779-1822, https://doi.org/10.1177/002199839603001603
- Naik, N.K. and P.S. Shembekar. 1992. Elastic behavior of woven fabric composites: I - lamina analysis, Journal of Composite Materials, 26:2196-2225, https://doi.org/10.1177/002199839202601502

=== Research publications ===
BOOKS AUTHORED: Naik, N.K. 1994. Woven Fabric Composites, Technomic Publishing Company, Inc., Lancaster, PA, USA. Now, CRC Press, Boca Raton, Florida, USA.

Chapters contributed to books:

1. Naik, N.K. 1996. Chapter title: Numerical Modelling of Woven Fabric Composite Materials, Chapter 13, pp 400–438, Book title: Numerical Analysis and Modelling of Composite Materials, Edited by: J.W. Bull, Publisher: Blackie Academic and Professional, London.

2. Naik, N.K. 1997. Chapter title: Mechanics of Woven Fabric Composites, Chapter 6, pp 249–307, Book title: Composites Engineering Handbook, Edited by: P.K. Mallick, Publisher: Marcel Dekker, Inc., New York.

3. Naik, N.K. 2003. Chapter title: Woven-Fibre Thermoset Composites, Chapter 10, pp 296–313, Book title: Fatigue in Composites, Edited by: Bryan Harris, Publisher: Woodhead Publishing Limited, Cambridge, England.

4. Naik, N.K. 2016. Chapter title: Ballistic Impact Behaviour of Composites: Analytical Formulation, Chapter 15, pp 425–470, Book title: Dynamic Deformation, Damage and Fracture in Composite Materials and Structures, Edited by: V. V. Silberschmidt, Publisher: Woodhead Publishing Limited, an imprint of Elsevier, Cambridge, England.

5. Naik, N.K. 2016. Chapter title: Analysis of Woven Fabric Composites for Ballistic Protection, Chapter 8, pp 217–262, Book title: Advanced Fibrous Composite Materials for Ballistic Protection, Edited by: Xiaogang Chen, Publisher: Woodhead Publishing Limited, an imprint of Elsevier, Cambridge, England.

PROCEEDINGS EDITED: Naik, N.K., K. Biswas and G.C. Popli, eds. 1997. Aerospace Manufacturing Technology, Proceedings of the 13th National Convention of Aerospace Engineers, The Institution of Engineers (India), Allied Publishers Limited, New Delhi.

== See also ==
- Ballistic impact
- Polymer matrix composite
- Composite material
- Aerospace
