= Prashant Ranade =

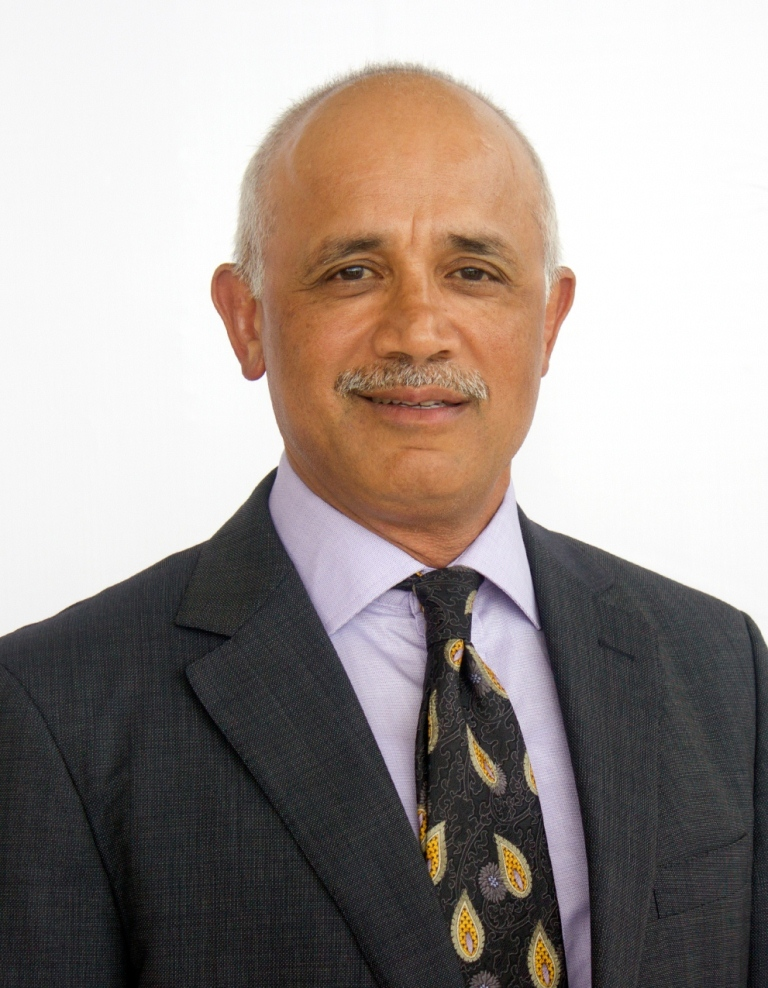
- Education: Xavier's University, United States; University of Cincinnati; Indian Institute of Technology Bombay
- Occupations: Former Co-Chairman Syntel, Independent Director of Public Companies
- Website: Prashant Ranade

Prashant Ranade was with Atos Syntel from 2007 till his retirement from the company in May 2020. He was the co-chairman of Syntel, Inc., (NASDAQ: SYNT) a position to which he was appointed on 3 November 2016. He was formerly executive vice chairman of syntel's board of directors and also served as the company's chief executive officer and president from February 2010.

Prior to working with Syntel, Ranade held several senior leadership roles in companies like Siemens, Rockwell Automation, and Dematic Corp.

Since May 2019 he is an Independent Board Member- Board of Directors, of Brinker International ( NYSE: EAT )

== Early life and education ==
Prashant Ranade did his schooling and college in Mumbai.

He studied mechanical engineering at the Indian Institute of Technology (IIT), Bombay, in 1975. He moved to the United States in 1975 where he earned his MS in Control Engineering from the University of Cincinnati in 1977 and did his MBA in Marketing and Finance at Xavier University, USA in 1982.

== Career ==
Ranade started his career as an engineer with Siemens Energy and Automation, and while working there he pursued his Masters in Business Administration from Xavier University in 1982. During his tenure, spanning 27 years, he grew in the company from being a trainee to handling leadership roles in different departments of the company like Energy and Automation, Controls and PLCs, Medical Technology and Logistics Business, culminating in his last role as the CEO of a group company with revenues over $2 billion.

Ranade has been a member of Syntel's board of directors since June 2007, and was formally appointed chief executive officer and president on 2 February 2010. He was elevated to become co-chairman of Syntel on 3 November 2016.

Ranade is a member of the National Association of Corporate Directors and served as an adjunct professor at Grand Valley State University, where he taught an MBA courses on Operations Management, Global Competitiveness and Leadership. He is also a member of engineering and manufacturing trade groups such as IEEE and MAPI, and has authored several articles on topics related to electromechanical equipment and their applications as well as leadership.

== Awards and honors ==
- Distinguished Alumnus, Department of Mechanical, Industrial and Nuclear Engineering, University of Cincinnati, 2007
- Distinguished Alumnus Award, IIT Bombay, Mumbai, 2007
