= K-convex function =

Mathematical function

K-convex functions, first introduced by Scarf, are a special weakening of the concept of convex function which is crucial in the proof of the optimality of the $(s,S)$ policy in inventory control theory. The policy is characterized by two numbers s and S, $S \geq s$, such that when the inventory level falls below level s, an order is issued for a quantity that brings the inventory up to level S, and nothing is ordered otherwise. Gallego and Sethi have generalized the concept of K-convexity to higher dimensional Euclidean spaces.

== Definition ==
Two equivalent definitions are as follows:

=== Definition 1 (The original definition) ===
Let K be a non-negative real number. A function $g: \mathbb{R}\rightarrow\mathbb{R}$ is K-convex if

$$g(u)+z\left[\frac{g(u)-g(u-b)}{b}\right] \leq g(u+z) + K$$

for any $u, z\geq 0,$ and $b>0$.

=== Definition 2 (Definition with geometric interpretation) ===
A function $g: \mathbb{R}\rightarrow\mathbb{R}$ is K-convex if

$$g(\lambda x+\bar{\lambda} y) \leq \lambda g(x) + \bar{\lambda} [g(y)+K]$$

for all $x\leq y, \lambda \in [0,1]$, where $\bar{\lambda}=1-\lambda$.

This definition admits a simple geometric interpretation related to the concept of visibility. Let $a \geq 0$. A point $(x,f(x))$ is said to be visible from $(y,f(y)+a)$ if all intermediate points $(\lambda x+\bar{\lambda} y, f(\lambda x+\bar{\lambda} y)), 0\leq \lambda \leq 1$ lie below the line segment joining these two points. Then the geometric characterization of K-convexity can be obtain as:

A function $g$ is K-convex if and only if $(x,g(x))$ is visible from $(y,g(y)+K)$ for all $y\geq x$.

=== Proof of equivalence ===
It is sufficient to prove that the above definitions can be transformed to each other. This can be seen by using the transformation

$$\lambda = z/(b+z),\quad x=u-b,\quad y=u+z.$$

== Properties ==
=== Property 1 ===
If $g: \mathbb{R}\rightarrow\mathbb{R}$ is K-convex, then it is L-convex for any $L\geq K$. In particular, if $g$ is convex, then it is also K-convex for any $K\geq 0$.

=== Property 2 ===
If $g_1$ is K-convex and $g_2$ is L-convex, then for $\alpha \geq 0, \beta \geq 0,\; g=\alpha g_1 +\beta g_2$ is $(\alpha K+\beta L)$-convex.

=== Property 3 ===
If $g$ is K-convex and $\xi$ is a random variable such that $E|g(x-\xi)|<\infty$ for all $x$, then $Eg(x-\xi)$ is also K-convex.

=== Property 4 ===
If $g: \mathbb{R}\rightarrow\mathbb{R}$ is K-convex, restriction of $g$ on any convex set $\mathbb{D}\subset\mathbb{R}$ is K-convex.

=== Property 5 ===
If $g: \mathbb{R}\rightarrow\mathbb{R}$ is a continuous K-convex function and $g(y)\rightarrow \infty$ as $|y|\rightarrow \infty$, then there exit scalars $s$ and $S$ with $s\leq S$ such that

- $g(S)\leq g(y)$, for all $y\in \mathbb{R}$;
- $g(S)+K=g(s)<g(y)$, for all $y<s$;
- $g(y)$ is a decreasing function on $(-\infty, s)$;
- $g(y)\leq g(z)+K$ for all $y, z$ with $s\leq y\leq z$.
