= Rajive Bagrodia =

American computer scientist

Rajive Bagrodia is an Indian-American computer scientist and entrepreneur. He is the Founder and Chief Technical Officer of Scalable Network Technologies as well as an emeritus professor of computer science at UCLA.

== Education and research ==
Rajive Bagrodia received his Bachelor of Technology in electrical engineering from the Indian Institute of Technology Bombay, and his MA and Ph.D. in Computer Science from the University of Texas at Austin. As a Professor of Computer Science at UCLA, his areas of research included wireless networks, mobile computing & communications, network simulation & analysis, and parallel & distributed computing. He led a research team in mobile computing and parallel and distributed programming and developed simulations systems such as Maisie, Parsec, and GloMoSim. This research was funded by The Defense Advanced Research Projects Agency (DARPA) under the Design of Mobile Adaptive Networks Using Simulation and Agent Technology(DOMAINS) project at UCLA. Given these results in performance prediction for complex, large-scale computer and communication systems, he founded Scalable Network Technologies in 1999.

Bagrodia has continued to conduct a prolific amount of research. He has published over 150 research papers in Computer Science journals and spoken at international conferences on high performance computing, wireless networking, and parallel simulation. He has also provided commentary on issues relating to cyberwarfare and warfighter training.
