= Decision Sciences =

- Discipline: Decision theory, business, management
- Language: English
- Edited by: Xenophon Koufteros and Sri Talluri

Publication details
- History: 1970-present
- Publisher: Wiley-Blackwell
- Frequency: Quarterly
- Impact factor: 5.5 (2022)

Standard abbreviations
- ISO 4: Decis. Sci.

Indexing
- ISSN: 0011-7315 (print); 1540-5915 (web)

Links
- Journal homepage

Decision Sciences is a peer-reviewed academic journal covering research about decision making within the boundaries of an organization, as well as decisions involving inter-firm coordination. According to the 2022 Journal Citation Reports, Decision Sciences has an impact factor of 5.5. The journal is ranked in the B category (on a scale from A+ to D) by the scientific journal ranking JOURQUAL (German Academic Association for Business Research/VHB) in 2015. Decision Sciences is published by Wiley-Blackwell on behalf of the Decision Sciences Institute. The current editors are Xenophon Koufteros (since 2019) and Sri Talluri (since 2020).

Decision Sciences is associated with the Decision Sciences Journal of Innovative Education. The website is completely offline.
