= Robert G. Merrick School of Business =

Coordinates: 39°18′20″N 76°37′1″W

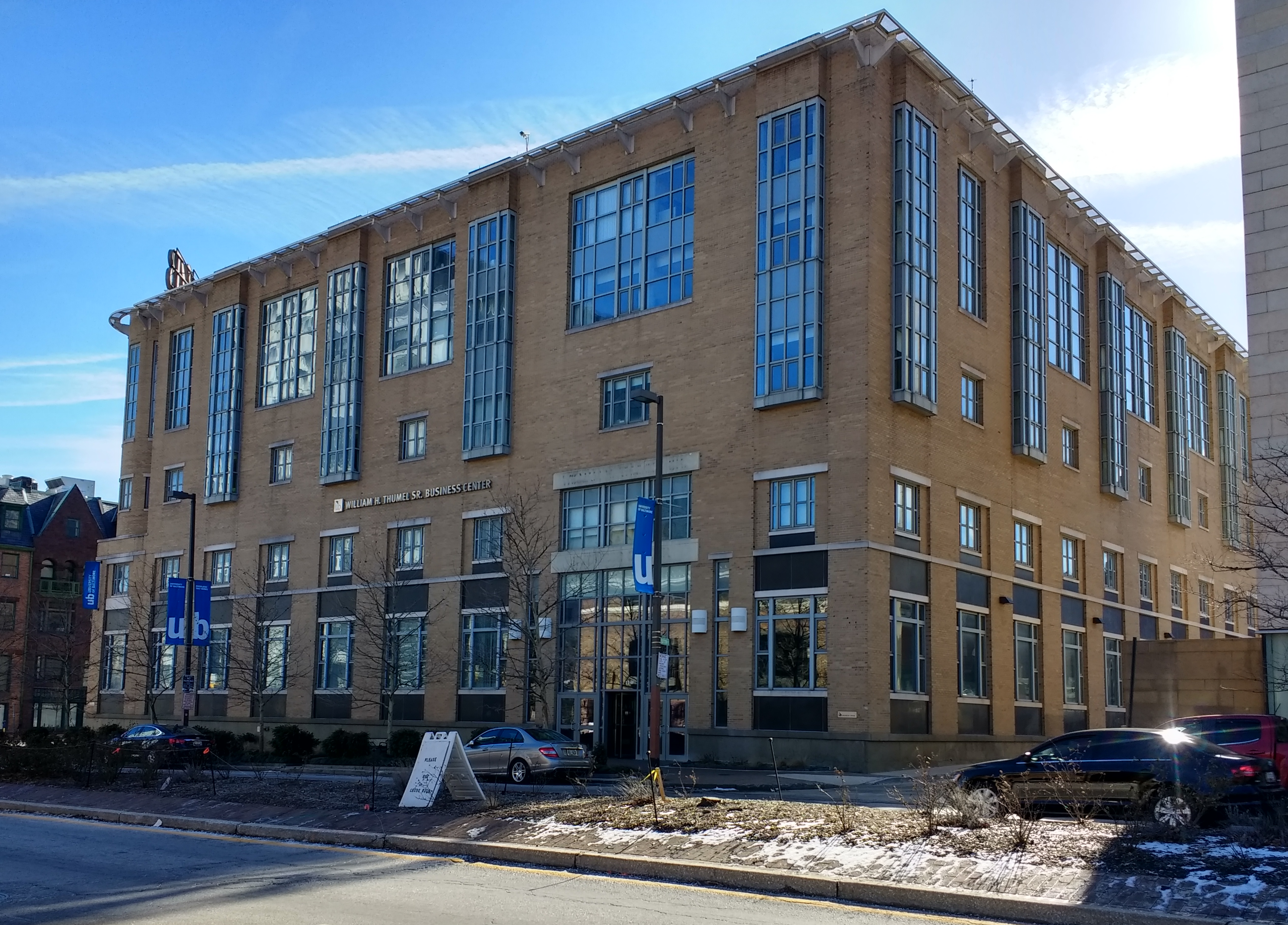
- William H. Thumel Sr. Business Center
- Type: Public
- Location: Baltimore, Maryland, USA
- Website: ubalt.edu/merrick

The Robert G. Merrick School of Business is the business school at the University of Baltimore. The school operates out of the William H. Thumel Sr. Business Center, located at the corner of Charles Street and Mount Royal Avenue, across from the school of law and south of Penn Station.

== History ==
While the university as a whole has a history of business programs dating back to its founding in 1925, it did not offer an MBA until 1972, when it began its Master in Business Administration program. The offering was followed by the Master of Science and certificate program. A merger of the university in 1973 with the Baltimore College of Commerce provided further business focus, and in 1982, the school received three large financial gifts from the Merrick Foundation. The school was then named after Robert G. Merrick, Sr.

== Controversy ==
In the second half of 2015, the school of business ended a joint MBA program it had operated with Towson University, with UBalt continuing to offer standalone MBA degrees, as it had since the 1970s. The cessation came as a result of complaints from alumni of several nearby HBCUs, alleging that state funding was illegally diverted from those institutions to the UBalt/Towson program (Towson and UBalt both being traditionally white institutions). The situation came to a head in late autumn, when the amorphous HBCU alumni group put forward in court a suggestion that UBalt be legally required by the judge to have its brand merged into that of Morgan State University, with Morgan being the surviving institution. The merger plan was heavily criticized by legal experts, academics and students alike, with the latter group going so far as to post anonymous "open letters" on campus bulletin boards to student governments, suggesting an alternate plan in which both UBalt and Morgan would be merged under the brand of UMBC—an existing, non-HBCU institution with a better track record of educating successful black students than that boasted by Morgan. After these open letters of backlash—which effectively amounted to a threat to the Morgan brand—were posted, the litigious group (consisting of alumni from Morgan and other HBCUs) effectively withdrew its merger suggestion. Catherine C. Blake, the judge considering the complaint, added legal weight to the rejection of the plan in early 2016, calling the idea of a merger of UBalt into Morgan State "extreme" and saying that the rejected plan "would not be considered further." The parties returned to court in early 2017 to argue over a different plan, which could see some programs transferred from historically white institutions to nearby HBCU counterparts.
