= Production and Operations Management =

Production and Operations Management Journal
- Discipline: Operations management, production management, management science, supply chain management, manufacturing engineering
- Language: English
- Edited by: Kalyan Singhal

Publication details
- History: 1992–present
- Publisher: Wiley-Blackwell on behalf of the Production and Operations Management Society
- Frequency: Monthly
- Open access: Hybrid
- Impact factor: 4.638 (2021)

Standard abbreviations
- ISO 4: Prod. Oper. Manag.

Indexing
- ISSN: 1059-1478 (print); 1937-5956 (web)
- LCCN: 2007212737
- OCLC no.: 796001827

Links
- Journal homepage; Online access; Online archive

Production and Operations Management (POM) is a monthly peer-reviewed academic journal covering research on all aspects of operations management, production management, management science, supply chain management, and manufacturing engineering. It is published by Sage Publications on behalf of Production and Operations Management Society. It is listed as one of the 50 journals used by the Financial Times to compile its business-school research ranks, Bloomberg Businessweek's Top 20 Journals, and UT Dallas 24 leading business journals.

== History ==
The journal and POM Society (POMS) were established by the editor-in-chief, Kalyan Singhal (University of Baltimore). Subodha Kumar is the Co-Editor-in-Chief for the POM journal and the Executive Director of POMS.

== Abstracting and indexing ==
The journal is abstracted and indexed in:

- Current Contents/Engineering, Computing & Technology
- EconLit
- EBSCO databases
- Inspec
- ProQuest databases
- Science Citation Index Expanded
- Scopus

According to the Journal Citation Reports, the journal has a 2021 impact factor of 4.638.
