= List of IIT Kanpur people =

This is a list of people affiliated with the Indian Institute of Technology Kanpur.

== Notable faculty ==
Name	Affliliation	Notability	References
H. C. Verma	Former professor, Nuclear physics	Authored several school, undergraduate and graduate textbooks, the most popular being the two-volume Concepts of Physics, co-founded Shiksha Sopan, a social upliftment organization for economically weaker children living near the campus of IIT Kanpur, Padma Shri recipient	
Manindra Agrawal	Director of IIT Kanpur, Professor of Computer Science and Engineering	Recipient of the first Infosys Prize for Mathematics, Gödel Prize, Shanti Swarup Bhatnagar Award in Mathematical Sciences and Padma Shri recipient	
Debabrata Goswami	Professor of Chemistry	Fellow of the Royal Society of Chemistry, Institute of Physics, Optical Society of America (OSA) Society of Photo-Optical Instrumentation Engineers	
Arun Kumar Biswas	Former Professor, Department of Metallurgical Engineering	Founder president of Indian Language Society, member of the INSA National Commission for History of Science, editorial board member of the Indian Journal of the History of Science	
Subramania Ranganathan	Former Professor and Head of the Department of Chemistry	Shanti Swarup Bhatnagar Prize for Science and Technology recipient	
Yogesh M. Joshi	Professor of Department of Chemical Engineering	Elected fellow of the Indian National Academy of Engineering	
Avinash Kumar Agarwal	Professor of Department of Mechanical Engineering	Elected fellow of the American Society of Mechanical Engineering (2013), Society of Automotive Engineers, US (2012), National Academy of Science, Allahabad (2018), Royal Society of Chemistry, UK (2018), International Society for Energy, Environment and Sustainability (2016), and Indian National Academy of Engineering (2015)	
Gautam Biswas	Professor of mechanical engineering	Fellow of the Indian National Academy of Engineering (INAE) and Institution of Engineers (IEI)	
Ashutosh Sharma	Chemical Engineering	Former Secretary Department of Science and Technology, Padma Shri recipient	

== Notable alumni ==
=== Business ===
Name	Class Year	Notability	References
Arvind Krishna	1985	CEO of IBM; Director of IBM Research	
Bhaskar Pramanik	1972	Former CEO of Microsoft India	
Mukesh Bansal	1997	Founder of Myntra; CEO and Founder of Cure.fit	
Som Mittal		Former President of NASSCOM	
N.R. Narayana Murthy	1969	Founder & Chairman Emeritus of Infosys, Padma Shri and Padma Vibhushan	
Jagjeet (Jeet) S. Bindra	1969	Director at Edison International	
Muktesh Pant	1976	Former CEO of Yum China	
Sangeet Paul Choudary		CEO & Founder of Platformation Labs and Young Global Leader at the World Economic Forum	
Umang Gupta	1971	chairman of the board and chief executive officer of Keynote Systems	
Lalit Jalan	1979	CEO of Reliance Infrastructure	
Prashant Pathak		Chairman of Investment Committee of Business Development Bank of Canada, CEO of Ekagrata Inc.	
Pradeep Sindhu	1974	Co-founder and Chief Technical Officer/Vice chairman of the board of directors of Juniper Networks Inc.	
Rakesh Gangwal	1975	Co-founder of IndiGo airline	
V. K Matthews		Founder chairman IBS software services	
Prakash Bare		Actor, producer, Technologist	

=== Politics and civil services ===
Name	Class Year	Notability	References
Abhay Karandikar	1988, 1994	Secretary Department of Science and Technology; Former Director, IIT Kanpur	
Rahul Navin	1990, 1993	Director of Enforcement Directorate	
Gyanesh Kumar	1987	26th Chief Election Commissioner of India, Former Election Commissioner of India, Indian Administrative Service(retd.) Officer of 1988 Batch Kerala Cadre	
Sanjay Malhotra		26th Governor of the Reserve Bank of India, Indian Administrative Service Officer of 1990 Batch Rajasthan Cadre	
Ashwini Vaishnaw	1994	Former Indian Administrative Service officer Minister of Railways; Minister of Electronics and Information Technology; Minister of Communications	
Amitabh Thakur	1989	Indian Police Service officer known for his anti-corruption advocacy, now active for ensuring accountability and transparency in public life through political party Adhikar Sena	
Prem Das Rai	1976	former Member of Parliament	
Saurabh Kumar	1986	former Ambassador of India to Iran	
Sudhir Vyas	1975	former Ambassador of India to Germany	
Satyendra Dubey	1994	Project Director in National Highways Authority of India assassinated for exposing corruption in the Golden Quadrilateral highway project.	
Ram Sewak Sharma	1978	Chairman, Telecom Regulatory Authority of India	
Duvvuri Subbarao	1969	22nd Governor of Reserve Bank of India	
Krishnamurthy Subramanian	1994	17th Chief Economic Adviser to the Government of India	
Muralee Thummarukudy		Chief Disaster Risk Reduction at United Nations Environment Programme	
Abhishek Singh	1992	Indian Administrative Service officer who headed the IndiaAI mission, oversaw National Informatics Center, the government's technology programme focusing on digital infrastructure and e-governance	

=== Science and technology ===
Name	Class Year	Notability	References
Abhay Bhushan	1965	Author of the File Transfer Protocol	
Kare Narain Pathak	1967	Condensed matter physicist, Former Vice-Chancellor & Professor Emeritus at Panjab University.	
Atish Dabholkar	1985	String theorist, Shanti Swarup Bhatnagar laureate	
Avinash Deshpande	1980	Astrophysicist, Shanti Swarup Bhatnagar laureate	
Mahan Mj	1992	Mathematician and a recipient of the 2011 Shanti Swarup Bhatnagar Award	
Rakesh Jain	1972	Distinguished Tumor researcher at Harvard Medical School and recent winner of National Medal of Science.	
Bhrigu Nath Singh	1998	Director General of IITRAM. Professor and former HAL chair professor, Indian Institute of Technology Kharagpur	
Sirshendu De	1998	Recipient of 2011 Shanti Swarup Bhatnagar Award and professor of chemical engineering department, IIT Kharagpur	
Shahid Jameel	1979	Virologist, Shanti Swarup Bhatnagar laureate	
Ashok Jhunjhunwala	1970	Padma Shri and professor, Department of Electrical Engineering, IIT Madras	
Deepak Dhar	1972	Theoretical physicist, Shanti Swarup Bhatnagar laureate	
Kapil Hari Paranjape	1982	Mathematician, Shanti Swarup Bhatnagar laureate	
Debasisa Mohanty	1988	Computational biologist, N-Bios laureate	
Pramod Sadasheo Moharir	1971	Geophysicist, Shanti Swarup Bhatnagar laureate	
Rajeev Motwani	1983	Computer scientist, Professor of Computer Science at Stanford University, Gödel Prize recipient	
Yashavant Kanetkar	1987	Computer science author, known for his books on Programming languages	
G. Ravindra Kumar	1990	Laser physicist, Shanti Swarup Bhatnagar laureate	
Jainendra K. Jain		Condensed matter theorist	
Jitendra Malik	1980	Arthur J. Chick Professor of EECS at University of California at Berkeley	
Ranjan Mallik	1987	Communications engineer, Shanti Swarup Bhatnagar laureat	
Uday Maitra	1981	Organic chemist, Shanti Swarup Bhatnagar laureate	
Shiraz Minwalla	1995	String theorist at TIFR who was awarded ICTP Prize for his contribution to theoretical physics	
Padmanabhan Balram		Director of IISC Bangalore and winner of Padma Bhushan	
Upinder Singh Bhalla	1982	Neuroscientist, Shanti Swarup Bhatnagar laureate	
Suresh Kumar Bhatia		Chemical engineer, academic, Shanti Swarup Bhatnagar laureate	
Narayanan Chandrakumar	1979	Chemical physicist, Shanti Swarup Bhatnagar laureate	
Tushar Kanti Chakraborty	1979	Organic chemist, Shanti Swarup Bhatnagar laureate	
Sandip Trivedi	1985	Theoretical physicist working at TIFR, recipient of the Infosys Prize 2010 in the category of Physical Sciences	
Vijay Vaishnavi	1971	Researcher and scholar in the computer information systems field	
Anil K. Rajvanshi	1972	Director, Nimbkar Agricultural Research Institute. Winner of Jamnalal Bajaj Award 2001, FICCI award 2002, Globe Award 2009, University of Florida Distinguished Alumnus Award 2014, Padma Shri Award 2022, IIT Kanpur Distinguished Alumnus Award 2022.	
Raghavan Varadarajan	1982	Biophysicist, Shanti Swarup Bhatnagar laureate	
Anuradha Misra	1983	Physicist	
Neeraj Kayal	2002	Computer scientist and mathematician noted for development of AKS primality test	
Nitin Saxena	2002	Computer scientist and mathematician noted for development of AKS primality test	
Pradyut Ghosh	1998	Inorganic chemist, Shanti Swarup Bhatnagar laureate	
Manu Prakash		Physical Biologist and Inventor, Best known for his Foldscope and Paperfuge	
Arup Kumar Raychaudhuri	1975	Condensed matter physicist, Shanti Swarup Bhatnagar laureate	
Ayyalusamy Ramamoorthy	1990	Scientist in the area of NMR and biological membranes	
Suryanarayanasastry Ramasesha	1977	Quantum chemist, Shanti Swarup Bhatnagar laureate	
Gopal Prasad	1966	Mathematician	
H. R. Krishnamurthy	1972	Theoretical Physicist	
Rajesh Gopakumar	1992	Theoretical physicist director of International Centre for Theoretical Sciences, Bangalore and winner of Shanti Swaroop Bhatnagar Award in 2009.	
Shridhar Ramachandra Gadre	1978	Computational Chemist and winner of Shanti Swaroop Bhatnagar Award in 1994.	

=== Teaching ===
Name	Class Year	Institute and Position	Notability	References
Rakesh Agrawal	1975	Professor of Chemical Engineering at Purdue University	National Medal of Technology and Innovation Laureate	
Rajit Gadh		Professor of Engineering, Director of UCLA Smart Grid Energy Research Center	Pioneer of Smart grids	
Balasubramanian Gopal		Professor of Molecular Biophysics Unit of Indian Institute of Science	Molecular biophysicist, Shanti Swarup Bhatnagar laureate	
Chandra Kintala		Professor and Director of Software Engineering, New Jersey Institute of Technology	Former Director, Bell Labs, USA	
Subodha Kumar	1997	Paul R. Anderson Distinguished Chair Professor and Founding Director, Center for Business Analytics and Disruptive Technologies, Fox School of Business, Temple University	Production and Operations Management Society (POMS) Fellow; Co-Editor-in-Chief, Production and Operations Management journal; Co-Editor-in-Chief and Founding Member, Management and Business Review journal	
Ranjan Roy		Professor emeritus and Chairman of Department of Mathematics and Computer Science, Beloit College	Recipient of the Deborah and Franklin Haimo Award for Distinguished College or University Teaching of Mathematics.	
Sanjay Sarma		Professor and Director of Digital Learning at MIT	Credited with developing standards and technologies in the commercial RFID industry	
Ashoke Sen	1976	Distinguished professor at the Harish-Chandra Research Institute, Allahabad	FRS, Padma Shri and Padma Bhushan, string theorist	
Sanjib Senapati		Professor at the Bhupat and Jyoti Mehta School of Biosciences, Department of Biotechnology of the Indian Institute of Technology Madras	N-Bios laureate	
Mriganka Sur	1974	Newton Professor of Neuroscience and Director of the Simons Center for the Social Brain at the Massachusetts Institute of Technology	Neuroscientist, fellow of the Royal Society	
K. VijayRaghavan	1977	Former Director of National Centre for Biological Sciences, Principal Scientific Adviser to the Government of India (2018-22)	Fellow of the Royal Society, foreign associate of the US National Academy of Sciences, Padma Shri and Infosys Prize recipient	
Spenta R. Wadia		Professor at Tata Institute of Fundamental Research	Founding Director of the International Centre for Theoretical Sciences, TWAS Prize recipient	
Suresh Venkatasubramanian		Professor at the University of Utah	Computer scientist and known for his contributions in computational geometry and differential privacy	
Sourav Pal	1977	Director of Indian Institute of Science Education and Research, Kolkata		
Anurag Kumar	1977	Director of Indian Institute of Science		
Suman Datta	1995	Semi-conductor researcher at Notre Dame University, USA	In 2013, he was named Fellow of the Institute of Electrical and Electronics Engineers (IEEE) and in 2016, Fellow of the National Academy of Inventors.	
Sartaj Sahni	1970	Distinguished Professor at the University of Florida	Sahni has published over 280 research papers and written 15 textbooks. His research publications are on the design and analysis of efficient algorithms, data structures, parallel computing, interconnection networks, design automation, and medical algorithms.He was elected as a Fellow of the Institute of Electrical and Electronics Engineers (IEEE) in 1988.	
