= P. T. Narasimhan =

Indian chemist and professor (1928-2013)

- Born: 28 July 1928; Cuddalore, Tamil Nadu, India
- Died: 3 May 2013 (aged 84); Sunnyvale, California, USA
- Education: University of Madras; Indian Institute of Science; Michigan State University; University of Illinois; Columbia University
- Known for: Studies on quantum-mechanical interpretation of magnetic resonance data
- Awards: 1970 Shanti Swarup Bhatnagar Prize; 1980 UGC C. V. Raman Award
- Scientific career
- Fields: Theoretical chemistry; Magnetic resonance
- Workplaces: Indian Institute of Technology, Kanpur; Huntington Medical Research Institutes; California Institute of Technology
- Doctoral advisor: R. S. Krishnan
- Doctoral students: Shridhar Ramachandra Gadre; Narayanan Chandrakumar

Palliakaranai Thirumalai Narasimhan (28 July 1928 – 3 May 2013), popularly known as PTN or Jim, was an Indian theoretical chemist, one of the pioneers of computational chemistry in India and a professor at the Indian Institute of Technology, Kanpur. He was known for his studies on quantum-mechanical interpretation of magnetic resonance data and his contributions in developing IIT Kanpur into a Centre of Excellence in academic research in the basic sciences. He was an elected fellow of the Indian National Science Academy, Indian Academy of Sciences and the National Academy of Sciences, India. The Council of Scientific and Industrial Research, the apex agency of the Government of India for scientific research, awarded him the Shanti Swarup Bhatnagar Prize for Science and Technology, one of the highest Indian science awards, in 1970, for his contributions to chemical sciences.

== Biography ==
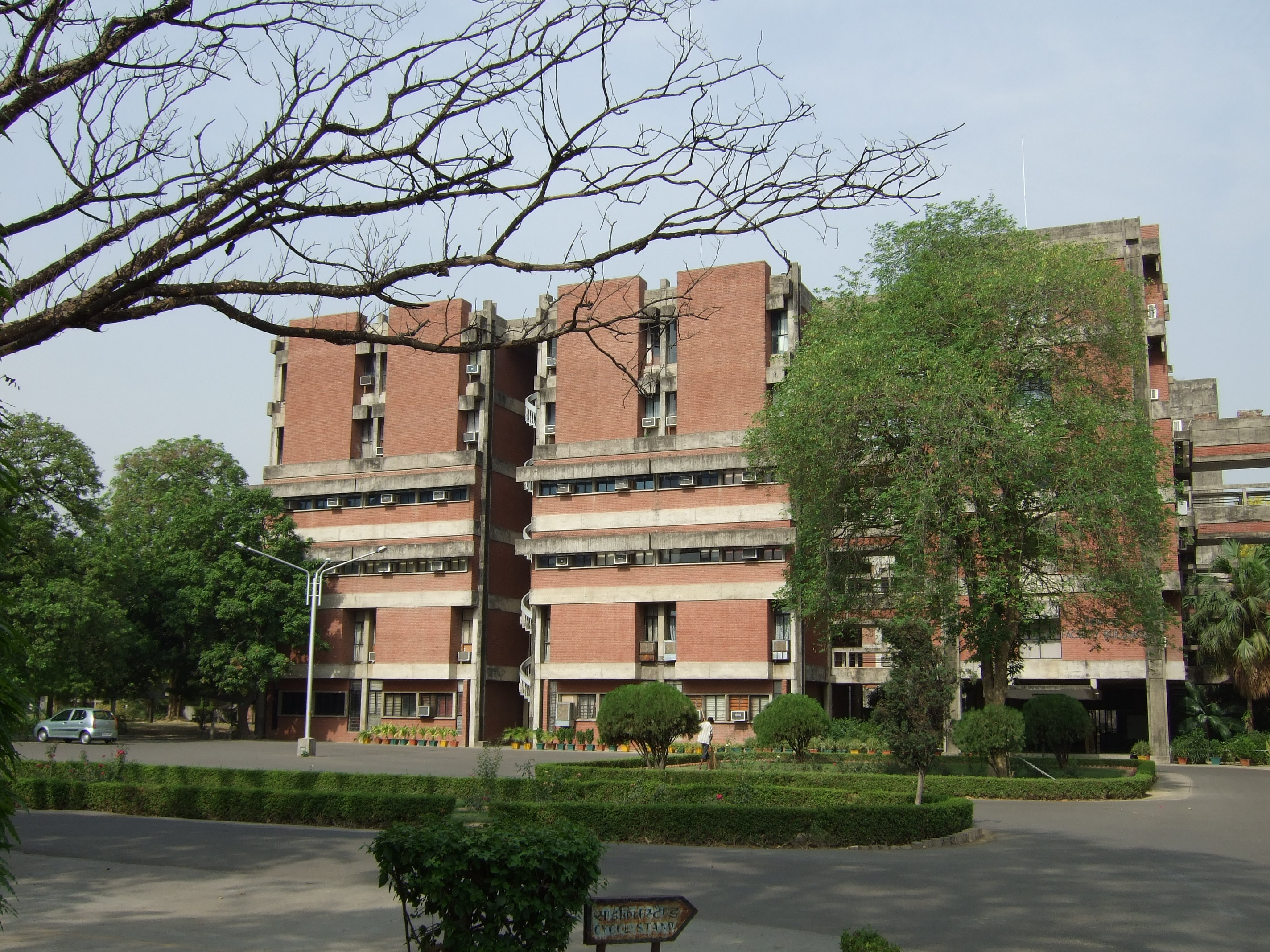
IIT Kanpur

P. T. Narasimhan, born on 28 July 1928 in Cuddalore, a coastal town in the south Indian state of Tamil Nadu, did his graduate studies (BSc) at the Madras Christian College of the University of Madras and passed a master's degree from the same college. Subsequently, he joined the Indian Institute of Science and secured a PhD in physical chemistry in 1955 under his Ph.D. mentor R. S. Krishnan. His post-doctoral research was at the laboratory of Max T. Rogers of the Michigan State University from 1957 to 1959 and with Martin Karplus, the recipient of Nobel Prize in Chemistry in 2013 during 1959 to 1961; starting at University of Illinois and when Karplus moved to Columbia University, Narasimhan followed him. He returned to India to join the Indian Institute of Technology, Kanpur in 1962 as an assistant professor where he became a professor in 1965 and stayed there till his superannuation in 1988. After retirement from academic service, he moved his base to Pasadena, California where he continued his research at the Huntington Medical Research Institutes and later, at the Beckman Institute of the California Institute of Technology.

Narasimhan was married to Leena and the couple had two daughters, Nalini and Nandini, and a son, Vikram in between. The family lived in Sunnyvale and it was here he died on 3 May 2013, at the age of 84, survived by his wife, children and six grand children. Narasimhan was known to have been competent in carnatic music and performed at various stages as a flautist in the US and in India.

== Legacy ==
Narasimhan, who chose physical chemistry for his research for PhD, focused on the theory of nuclear spin coupling constants during his stint at Martin Karplus' laboratory; his mentor would go on to propound the Karplus equation which describes the correlation between coupling constants and dihedral angles in proton nuclear magnetic resonance spectroscopy. His studies of the structure and properties of molecules were based on quantum-mechanical interpretation of magnetic resonance data and those studies assisted in widening the understanding of chemical bonding, conformation, chemical reactivity and electrical and magnetic properties of molecules. His contributions helped in the development of dynamic nuclear polarization at X-band in India, covering both the instrumentation and chemical applications.

Some of the important contributions from Narasimhan were in the field of computational chemistry and the work of his research school at the IITK was reported to have pioneered the discipline in India. He and his colleagues developed indigenously-built phase locked super-regenerative oscillator-detectors and pulsed Nuclear quadrupole resonance (NQR) double resonance system. They also investigated the high resolution nuclear magnetic resonance of small molecules dissolved in liquid crystalline, the alternating linewidth in Electron Spin Resonance, coupling constants in nuclear magnetic resonance, and Sternheimer shielding and anti-shielding factors employing the Hartree–Fock method. His expertise in the field prompted the Institute of Nuclear Medicine and Allied Sciences to seek his assistance when they decided to establish one of the first magnetic resonance imaging facilities in the country which he successfully accomplished. He also worked on developing a magnetic resonance microscopy as an imaging tool for biological research.

Narasimhan published over 200 articles (Note: Please see Selected bibliography section) in peer-reviewed journals and mentored 20 doctoral researchers. His doctoral and masters students included Shridhar Ramachandra Gadre, K. D. Sen, N. Chandrakumar, S Shankar, and Manvendra Krishna Dubey (MS 1979) and he guided many researchers in their work. He organized an active research school at the Indian Institute of Technology, Kanpur featuring scholars from physics and chemistry departments which worked on the theoretical and experimental aspects of magnetic resonance. As the head of the department of chemistry, he assisted the department to develop into a centre of excellence in chemical research. He was one of the founders of the Association of Magnetic Resonance Spectroscopists of India and served as its secretary. He was associated with the International Society of Magnetic Resonance as a member of its council and chaired the national advisory committee of the IX International Symposium on Nuclear Quadrupole Resonance held in Kanpur in 1988. He also served as the general secretary of the National Academy of Sciences, India for four terms from 1977 to 1980.

== Awards and honors ==
The Council of Scientific and Industrial Research awarded Narasimhan the Shanti Swarup Bhatnagar Prize, one of the highest Indian science awards, in 1970. In 1980, he received the Sir C. V. Raman Award for Research in Physical Sciences of the University Grants Commission of India. He has delivered several award orations including the Professor R. K. Asundi Endowment Lecture of the Indian National Science Academy, Acharya J. C. Ghosh Memorial Lecture of the Indian Chemical Society and Mitra Memorial Lecture of the University of Delhi. He was an elected fellow of the Indian Academy of Sciences (1971), the National Academy of Sciences, India and the Indian National Science Academy (1972) and an Institute Fellow of the Indian Institute of Technology, Kanpur (2013). The Archive for Organic Chemistry issued a festschrift on him by way of volume VIII in 2004. Srinivasa Ramanujan Institute for Basic Sciences (SRIBS) and Indian Institute of Information Technology and Management, Kerala jointly conducted a four-day national workshop on computational chemistry in June 2013 which was dedicated to the memory of Narasimhan.

== Selected bibliography ==
- P. T. Narasimhan, S. V. Anantakrishnan (January 1953). "Dipole moments of camphor compounds - Part I". Proceedings of the Indian Academy of Sciences, Section A. a (a): a. doi:10.1007/BF03052679. S2CID 92633988.
- P. T. Narasimhan, S. V. Anantakrishnan (June 1953). "Dipole moments of camphor compounds - Part II". Proceedings of the Indian Academy of Sciences, Section A. 37 (6): 747–751. doi:10.1007/BF03052728. S2CID 92188221.
- Sen K.D., Narasimhan P. T. (1975). "Nuclear hexadecapole antishielding factors". Physical Review. 11 (4): 1162–1167. Bibcode:1975PhRvA..11.1162S. doi:10.1103/physreva.11.1162.
- Gadre S. R., Narasimhan P. T. (1977). "Electron momentum distributions from valence-bond wave functions". Int. J. Quantum Chem. 12 (1): 105–113. doi:10.1002/qua.560120110.
- Shankar S., Narasimhan P. T. (1984). "Linear coupled-cluster method. II. Analysis of local exchange-correlation potentials in beryllium and its isoelectronic series". Phys. Rev. 29 (1): 58–63. Bibcode:1984PhRvA..29...58S. doi:10.1103/physreva.29.58.
- Mora B.; Narasimhan P.T.; Ross B.D.; Allman J.; Barker P. B. (1991). "P Saturation Transfer and Phosphocreatine Imaging in the Monkey Brain" (PDF). Proceedings of the National Academy of Sciences of the United States of America. 88 (19): 8372–8376. Bibcode:1991PNAS...88.8372M. doi:10.1073/pnas.88.19.8372. PMC 52510. PMID 1924297.
- Narasimhan P. T., Ghosh Pratik, Fraser, S.E., Jacobs R.E (1994). "Magnetic resonance microscopy: challenges in biological imaging using a 500 MHz NMR microscope". Proceedings - Indian Academy of Sciences. Chemical Sciences. 27 (5).

== See also ==
- Martin Karplus
- Shridhar Ramachandra Gadre
