= University Institute of Engineering and Technology =

University Institute of Engineering and Technology may refer to:

- University Institute of Engineering and Technology, Calicut
- University Institute of Engineering and Technology, Kanpur University
- University Institute of Engineering and Technology, Kurukshetra University
- University Institute of Engineering and Technology, Panjab University
