= HMRI =

HMRI may refer to:

== Medical research institutes ==
- Hunter Medical Research Institute, Newcastle, Australia
- Huntington Medical Research Institutes, Pasadena, California

== Other uses ==
- His Majesty's Railway Inspectorate, a British government agency
- Housing Market Renewal Initiative, a scheme which ran in the UK from 2002 to 2011
