= Goonj =

Goonj (lit. 'echo') may refer to the following Indian films:

- Goonj (1952 film), a 1952 Bollywood film, starring Suraiya
- Goonj (1974 film), Bollywood film directed by S.U. Syed, starring Rakesh Roshan and Reena Roy
- Goonj (1989 film), Bollywood film directed by Jalal Agha, starring Kumar Gaurav and Juhi Chawla

== See also ==
- Goonj (NGO), established 1998, Indian humanitarian aid and development non-governmental organisation based in Delhi
- Goonj, annual cultural festival of University Institute of Engineering and Technology, Panjab University, Chandigarh
- Goonj, A 2025 Pakistani TV series starring Komal Meer, Feroz Qadri and Gohar Rasheed
