= Society for Biological Engineering (UIET) =

Society for Biological Engineering Students Chapter at UIET, Panjab University (SBE UIET) is professional organisation for Biotechnology students of engineering and sciences running under the department of Biotechnology, University Institute of Engineering and Technology, Panjab University, located in Chandigarh, India. It is the first student chapter in India and was established in September 2009.

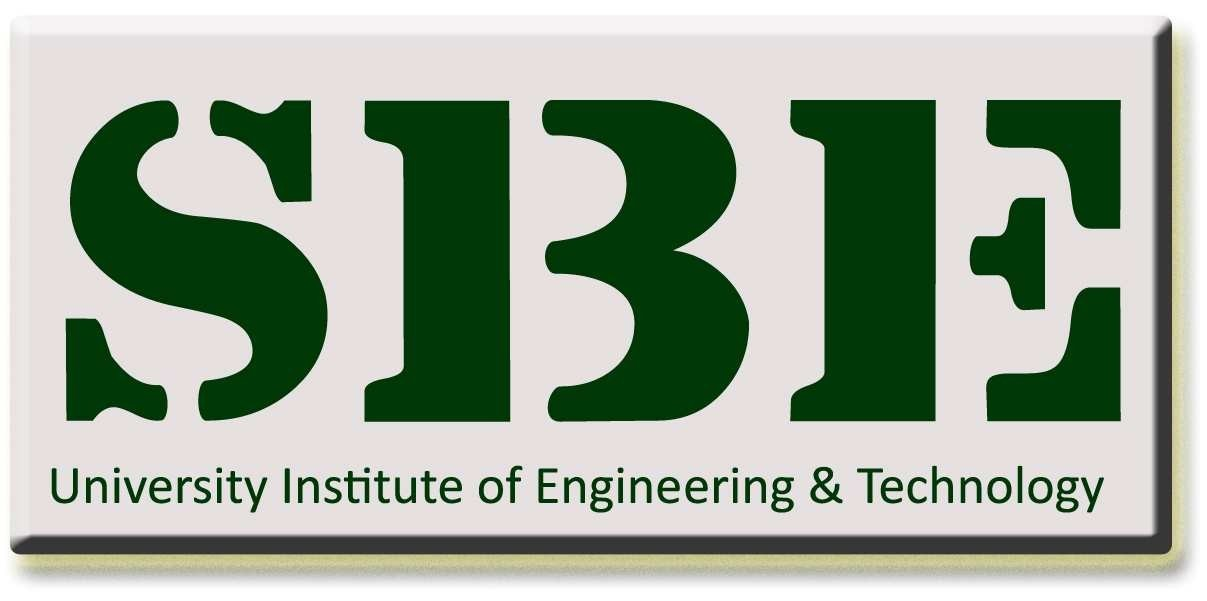

== Society for Biological Engineering, AIChE ==
The Society for Biological Engineering (SBE), an American Institute of Chemical Engineers Technological Community, is a professional organization of Biological engineers and scientists in the field of Biotechnology. Its area of working generally focuses on Bioprocessing, Biomedical and Biomolecular engineering.

== Working of SBE UIET ==
SBE UIET offers membership to Biotechnology undergraduates and postgraduates, B.Sc. graduates and postgraduates and research scholars studying in tricity of Chandigarh, Mohali and Panchkula every year. SBE UIET board for a particular year is selected on the basis of several in-person and telephonic interviews.

SBE UIET holds industrial visits twice a session and an education and adventure tour once a session.

== Events in 2015-16 ==
SBE UIET conducted several events in 2015-16 and yet to organize many more. Some of them are:

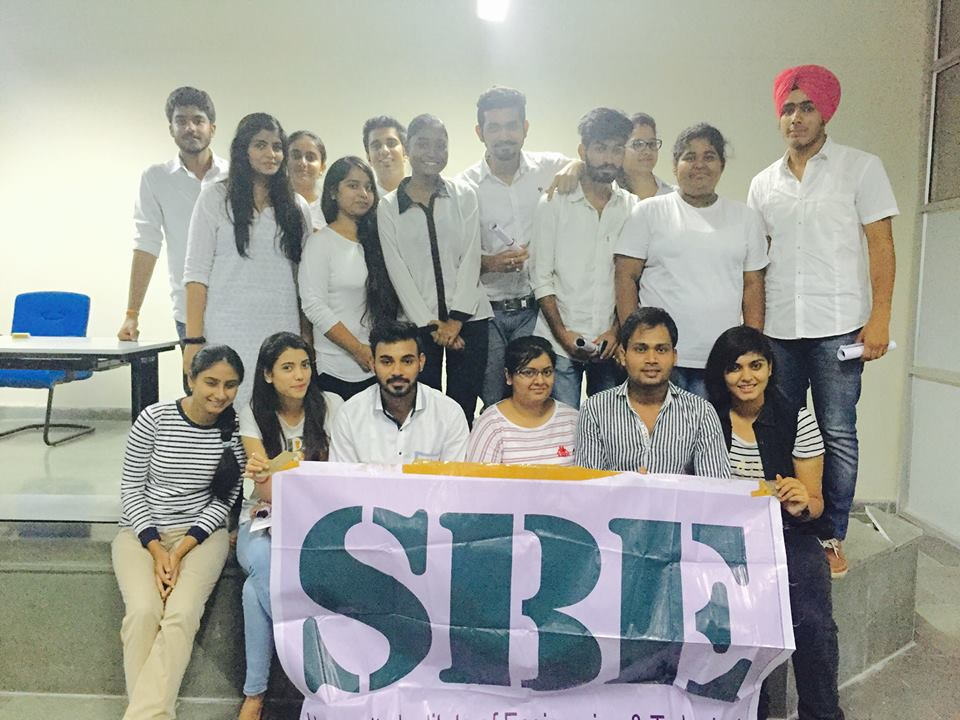
SBE UIET board 2015-16

- Crime Scene Investigation
- BioStreaks
- BioCanvas
- Pseudo Science
- Mobile Quiz 2016
- BioConnect 2016

== Events in 2016-17 ==
SBE UIET conducted several events in 2016-17 and there are many more yet to organize. Some of them are:

- Bio-cAMP 2016: The IPR Cell of Centre for Industry Institute Partnership Programme (CIIPP) of Panjab University (PU) in collaboration with Cell for IPR Promotion & Management (CIPAM), department of Industrial Policy and Promotion, Government of India organized a Special Lecture Series under a National Symposium "Bio-cAMP 2016". The discussions were made on "Current Trends and Future Prospects in Biotechnology".This event was organized by the Biotechnology Department of UIET, PU. During this event Assistant Controller of Patent & Designs, Patent Office, Ministry of Industry & Commerce, Government of India Dr Usha Rao deliberated upon the patent laws and IPR issues related to Biotechnology. The second talk by Senior Scientific Officer (Env) & Incharge (PIC), Punjab State Council for Science & Technology, Chandigarh Gurharminder Singh further took it to the next level, where students were provided information with the case studies, how to file a patent, how to preserve a patent in Biotechnology sector.
- Crime Scene Investigation (CSI)

== Events in 2018-19 ==
SBE-UIET conducted several events during 2018-19:

- 1-day industrial trip to Central Research Institute, Kasauli, Himachal Pradesh, India on 5 October 2018.
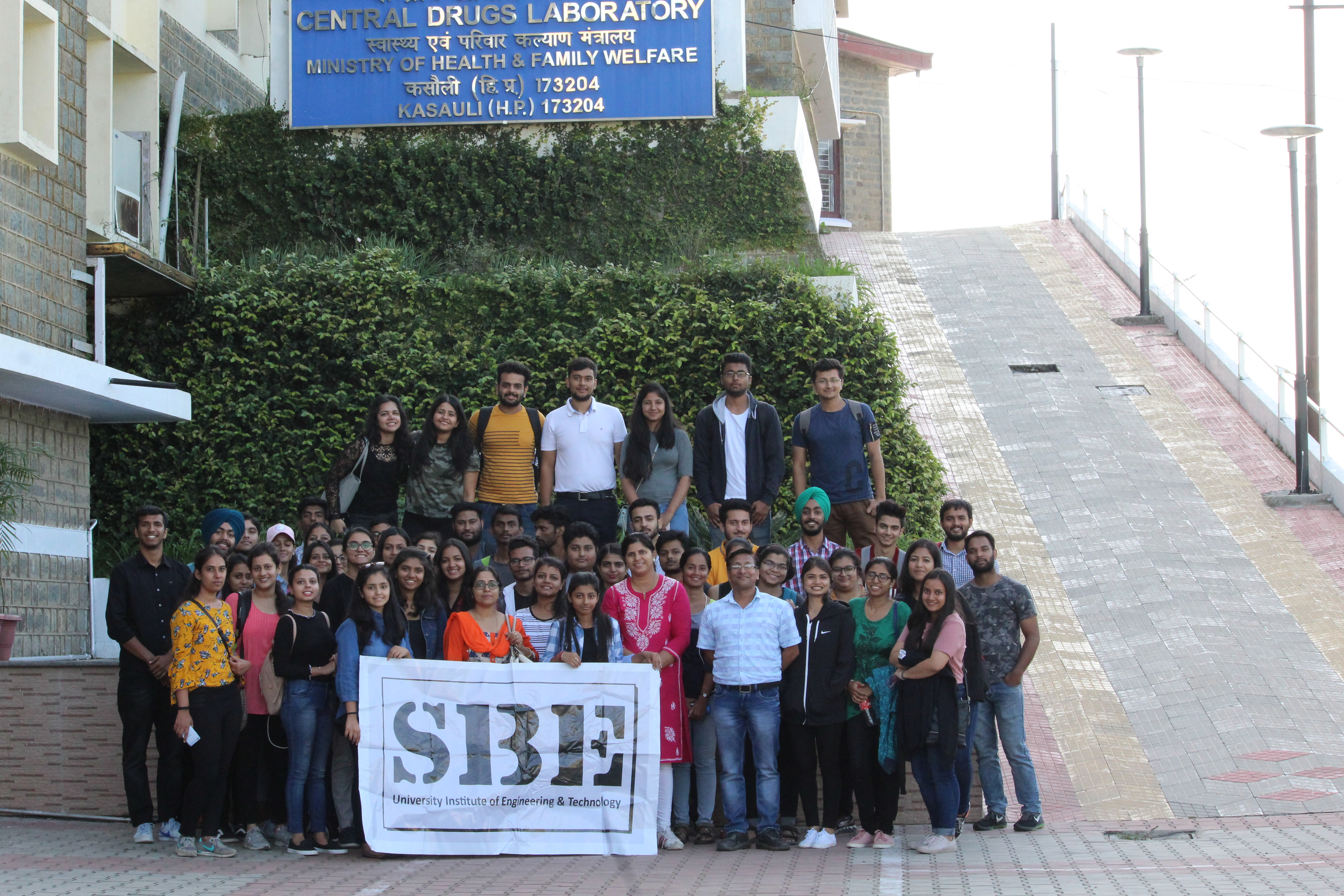
  SBE-UIET's 2018 Industrial Trip to Central Drugs Laboratory, Kasauli
- Bio-cAMP 2018: To promote quality research in the field of Biotechnology by acquainting the students to the latest in the field of Biotechnology, a national symposium on "Current Trends and Future Prospects in Biotechnology" was held on 1& 2 November 2018 by the department of Biotechnology, UIET, Panjab University, Chandigarh in collaboration with SBE-UIET and TEQIP III. The symposium is aimed to provide a common platform for exchange of ideas among academics, researchers, industrialists and students associated with various aspects of Biotechnology. Emphasis was also given on understanding the current growth and future prospects of biotechnology in India.
- Goonj 2019- Bio-Riddles and Pictionary were organised on the 1st day of the fest and Crime Scene Investigation (CSI) on the 2nd day of the fest. Winners were awarded accordingly.

== Events in 2019-20 ==
SBE-UIET conducted these events in 2019-20:

- Induction Program 2k19 Induction Programme 2k19 was organised for the freshers on 30 August. Several games such as ball wars and biology charades were there for the students to know each other along with song and dance performances. Our president addressed the students and talked about career prospects in Biotechnology field along with the role of SBE. Overall it was a fun event and helped juniors and seniors in getting to know each other.
- 1-day industrial trip to ICAR-Central Potato Research Institute, Shimla on 4 October 2019.
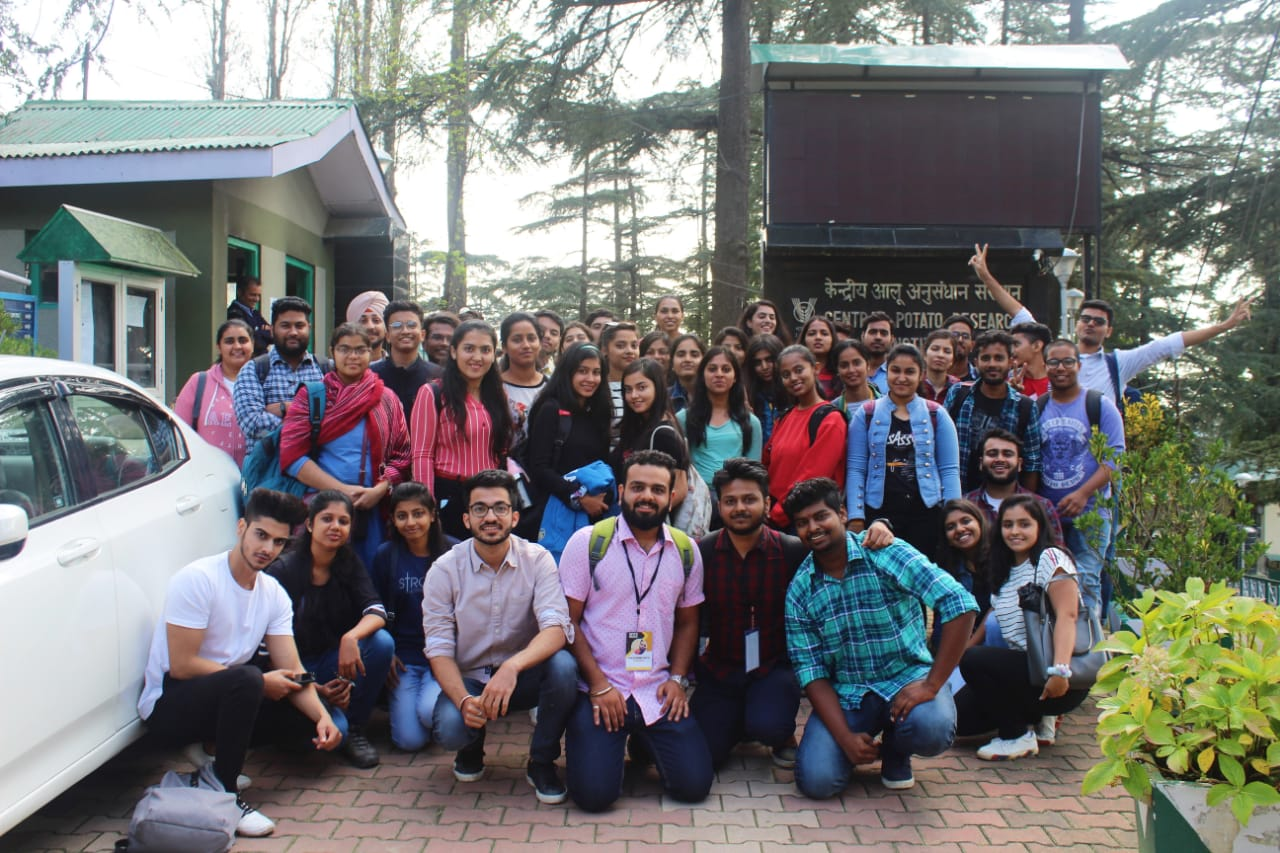
  SBE-UIET's 2019 Industrial Trip to ICAR-Central Potato Research Institute, Shimla
- SBE-UIET organised several online events during this worldwide lockdown, which not only helped students showcase their talents and do something productive during the lockdown but also gave us a way to stay connected with them. Starting with a 5 line horror story competition 'FRIGHT OF 5' where the participants were asked to submit a horror story, consisting of 5 lines or less. Increased momentum with 'Meme Maniac' and 'Reflection Galleria'. Meme Maniac was a meme making competition based on the current situation due to the global pandemic and Reflection Galleria was to showcase the artists hidden inside us, any art form such as painting, sketching, digital, etc were appreciated. 'Captured' - the photography event acted as a catalyst to this momentum. We received national and international entries. All the entries were posted on SBE's official Instagram handle (@sbe_uiet) and the winners were awarded certificates and cash prizes.
- BioEpitome 20 SBE-UIET in collaboration with SBE-VIT organised scientific abstract writing competition, a technical event where participants showcased their writing skills and knowledge. The registrations started from 15 July 2020 and got 130+ registrations. It went on for more than a month and ended on 27 August 2020.

== Events in 2020-21 ==
SBE-UIET conducted these events in 2020-21:

- Bioepitome21'
