= Norman Feather =

English nuclear physicist

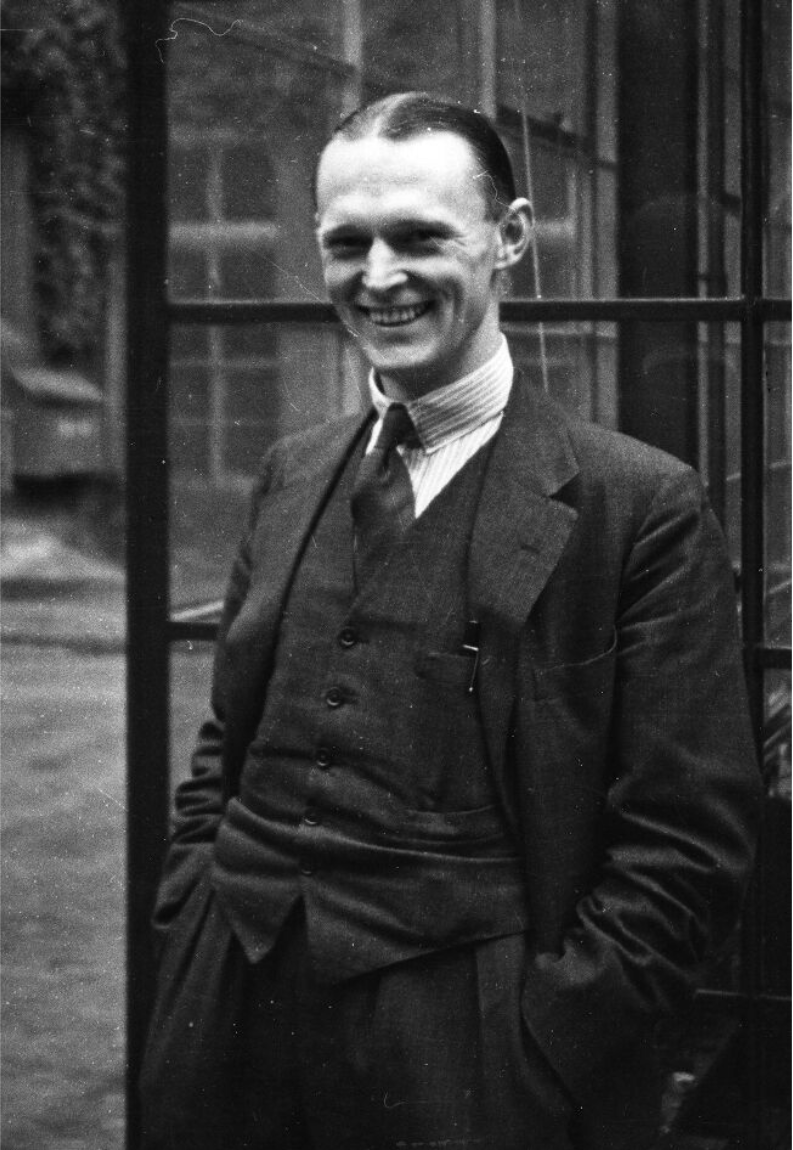
- Feather stands by a door at the Cavendish Laboratory, 1934
- Born: 16 November 1904; Pecket Well, Yorkshire, England
- Died: 14 August 1978 (aged 73); Manchester, England
- Education: University of Cambridge
- Known for: Creation and fission of plutonium by neutrons
- Awards: Fellow of the Royal Society (1945); Fellow of the Royal Society of Edinburgh (1946); RSE Makdougall Brisbane Prize (1970)
- Scientific career
- Fields: Nuclear Physics
- Workplaces: University of Cambridge; University of Edinburgh
- Thesis: A study of certain corpuscular radiations of the active deposits of radium and thorium by the expansion chamber method (1931)
- Doctoral advisor: Ernest Rutherford
- Notable students: R. S. Krishnan

Norman Feather FRS FRSE PRSE (16 November 1904 – 14 August 1978), was an English nuclear physicist. Feather and Egon Bretscher were working at the Cavendish Laboratory, Cambridge in 1940, when they proposed that the 239 isotope of element 94 (plutonium) would be better able to sustain a nuclear chain reaction. This research, a breakthrough, was part of the Tube Alloys project, the secret British project during World War II to develop nuclear weapons.

Feather was the author of a series of noted introductory texts on the history, fundamental concepts, and meaning of physics.

== Early life and education ==
Feather was born in 1904 to Samson and Lucy (Clayton) Feather in Pecket Well, West Yorkshire, Northern England. His father was headmaster of Pecket Well. When Feather was still an infant, his father became headmaster of Holme Primary School in Yorkshire, which Feather later attended.

Feather was educated at Bridlington Grammar School and Trinity College, Cambridge, before taking a year in the University of London and gaining a Bachelor of Science degree (first class) in 1926. He was a Fellow of Trinity College from 1929 to 1933 then Fellow and Lecturer in Natural Sciences there from 1936 to 1945. Feather received his doctorate (PhD) at Cambridge in 1931 under James Chadwick and Ernest Rutherford. His research employed a Wilson cloud chamber and focused on the problem of the long-range alpha particles.

In 1932 Feather married Kathleen Grace Burke (d.1975).

== Career ==
=== Discovery of the Neutron ===
In 1929, Feather took a year-long visit to Johns Hopkins University in Baltimore, USA. During his visit, he learned that Kelly Hospital used radon tubes in the treatment of cancers, and that the expired tubes were discarded after use. The expired radon tubes were a source of polonium, a source of energetic alpha particles. Since polonium was difficult to obtain and expensive at the time, Feather acquired a large number of the discarded radon tubes. The expired radon was to be used as a source of alpha particles for experiments in Cambridge. Indeed, the radioactive polonium source used by James Chadwick to discover the neutron in 1932 was derived from these radon tubes.

Feather assisted Chadwick with his investigations leading to the discovery of the neutron. He then conducted some of the earliest investigations with the neutron. Feather obtained the first evidence that neutrons can produce nuclear disintegrations. The year 1932 would later be referred to as the "annus mirabilis" for nuclear physics in the Cavendish Laboratory.

=== Plutonium and Tube Alloys ===
In 1940 Feather and Egon Bretscher at the Cavendish Laboratory, made a breakthrough in nuclear research for the Tube Alloys project. They proposed that the 239 isotope of element 94 could be produced from the common isotope of uranium-238 by neutron capture. Like U-235, this new element should be able to sustain a nuclear chain reaction. A slow neutron reactor fueled with uranium would, in theory, produce substantial amounts of plutonium-239 as a by-product, since U-238 absorbs slow neutrons to form the new isotope U-239. This nuclide rapidly emits an electron, decaying into an element with a mass of 239 and an atomic number of 93. This nuclide then emits another electron to become a new element still of mass 239, but with an atomic number 94 and a much greater half-life.

Bretscher and Feather showed theoretically feasible grounds that element 94 would be readily 'fissionable' by both slow and fast neutrons, and had the added advantage of being chemically different from uranium and therefore could easily be separated from it. This was confirmed independently in 1940 by Edwin M. McMillan and Philip Abelson at the Berkeley Radiation Laboratory. Nicholas Kemmer of the Cambridge team proposed the names Neptunium for the new element 93 and Plutonium for 94 by analogy with the outer planets Neptune and Pluto beyond Uranus (uranium being element 92). The Americans fortuitously suggested the same names. The production and identification of the first sample of plutonium in 1941 is generally credited to Glenn Seaborg, who used a cyclotron rather than a reactor.

=== Professor in Edinburgh ===
Feather was Professor of Natural Philosophy at the University of Edinburgh from 1945 to 1975, then emeritus Professor. He was active in nuclear physics research throughout his career, preferring small-scale, modest experiments, rather than the large experiments that became common after the war. Feather was noted for his active service to the University of Edinburgh and the city of Edinburgh.

Feather was appointed a Fellow of the Royal Society (FRS) in 1945. From 1946 he was also a Fellow of the Royal Society of Edinburgh (his proposers including C. T. R. Wilson) and was President of that Society from 1967 to 1970. Feather won the Makdougall Brisbane Prize of the Royal Society of Edinburgh for 1968–70.

=== Author ===
Beginning in 1936, Feather authored several monographs on nuclear physics and basic introductory physics, including a biography of Rutherford in 1940. J.D. Jackson cited Feather's monograph on Electricity and Matter as a good account of the history of electricity and magnetism "with a perceptive discussion of the original experiments."

== Death ==
Feather died on 14 August 1978 at Christie Hospital in Manchester.

== Books ==
- N. Feather, An Introduction to Nuclear Physics, Cambridge University Press, 1936. ASIN B00085IOJG
- N. Feather, Lord Rutherford, Blackie & Son, 1940. ASIN B0006APC66
- N. Feather, Nuclear Stability Rules, Cambridge University Press, 1952. ASIN B0007IW0BM
- N. Feather, Mass Length and Time, Edinburgh University Press, 1962. ASIN B000XWAWI0
- N. Feather, Vibrations and Waves, Edinburgh University Press, 1963. ASIN B000FSNW0W
- N. Feather, Electricity and Matter: An introductory survey, Edinburgh University Press, 1968. ASIN B00KO6MLPM
- N. Feather, Matter and Motion, Penguin Books Ltd., 1970. ISBN 978-0140801286
