= K N Pathak =

Indian physicist

Kare Narain Pathak
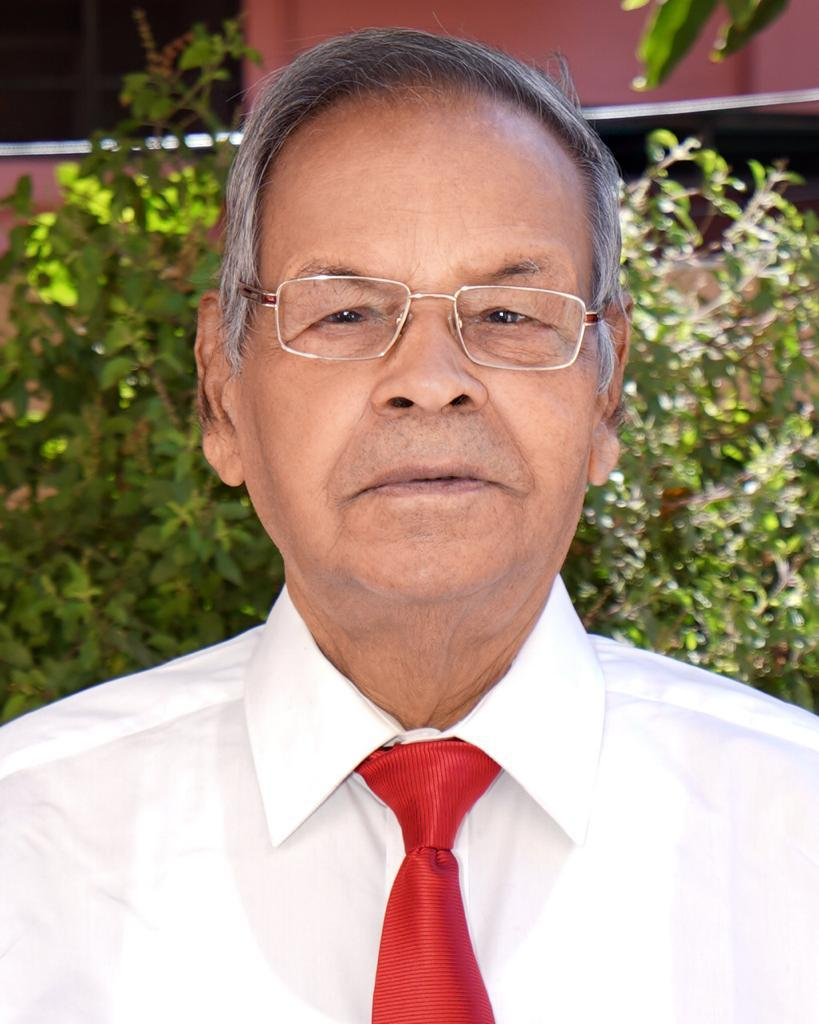
- Born: 30 July 1941 (age 85); Bhadohi, India
- Education: K N Govt College, Gyanpur - Agra University, University of Allahabad, IIT Kanpur
- Known for: Theoretical Condensed Matter Physics
- Spouse: Kulwanti
- Awards: Meghnad Saha Award for 1996 (Awarded by UGC), Goyal Prize for Physics by Kurukshetra University (2001)
- Scientific career
- Fields: Physics
- Workplaces: Panjab University

Notes
- Internationally recognized for his work on dynamical correlations and response functions in classical and quantum liquids, phonon-phonon interactions in solids, atomic interaction on metallic surface, Homogeneous electron gas in 1D.

Kare Narain Pathak FNA, FASc, FNASc is an Indian Theoretical Condensed Matter Physicist, Professor Emeritus and Former Vice-Chancellor of the Panjab University. He is an elected Fellow of several science academies such as the Indian Academy of Sciences, Indian National Science Academy, National Academy of Sciences, India, National Research Council Canada and Punjab Academy of Sciences.

== Early life and education ==
Kare Narain Pathak was born at Baragaon-Chaukhari Village in Bhadohi District, Uttar Pradesh on 30 July 1941. He earned the B.Sc. and M.Sc. degrees from K N Govt College, Gyanpur (Agra University) and the University of Allahabad, respectively. After that, he joined the Indian Institute of Technology, Kanpur, to work on theoretical solid state physics and obtained a PhD degree in 1967.

After a brief stint as lecturer in physics at IIT Mumbai, for about a year, Pathak worked as Postdoctoral Research Fellow during 1967–70 at National Research Council, Canada and Northwestern University, U.S.A.

In 1970, he was invited by Panjab University, Chandigarh, to join as a Reader in the Department of Physics. He became Professor of Physics in 1977 and remained Professor until 2001.He worked in various capacities as Head of the department of physics, Dean of faculty of science, Dean of university instruction, and thereafter vice-chancellor (2000–06). After his superannuation, he worked as a senior scientist of the Indian National Science Academy and National Academy of Sciences, India for 10 Years.

He is a chairman of Postgraduate Institute of Medical Education and Research, Chandigarh, the ethics committee of biomedical research, drug trials, member of organ transplant committee, and the ethics committee for stem cell research.

He has received D.Sc. (Honoris Causa) from Desh Bhagat University, Mandi Gobindgarh, Punjab on 14th Feb 2021 for his exceptional contribution in the condensed matter physics.

== Biography ==
A Biography of Professor K.N. Pathak released in September 2006. The book is written by Subhash Bhasker published by Unistar Books and has been translated in Hindi and English.

- Jiwani Professor K N Pathak - Book By Subhash Bhasker

== Academic and research ==
K.N. Pathak has made distinct contributions in our understanding of structure and dynamics of classical & quantum liquids, including electron correlation effects in Coulomb systems. He is known for his contribution nationally and internationally particularly for obtaining several exact results for the dynamical correlation function for the above systems. His theory of phonon-phonon interaction in solids provides for the first time both thermodynamic and dynamic properties in a self-consistent manner. It has been successfully applied to explain various phenomena connected with phonon-phonon interaction.

- Research Papers published in international journals - 140 and Review Articles - 7.
- Supervised 13 PhD. Thesis and 6 M.Phil. Thesis. Supervised 5 postdoctoral fellows (Dr D K Chaturvedi, Dr Keya, Dharam Vir, Dr Vinod Ashokan, Dr Rajesh Sharma)

== Legacy ==
During his tenure as a Vice-Chancellor of Panjab University (2000–06), he has established crucial institutions such as the University Institute of Engineering and Technology (UIET), University Institute of Legal Studies, Dr Harvansh Singh Judge Institute of Dental Sciences and Hospital, Center for Defense and National security studies, Panjab University Regional centres at Hoshiarpur & Ludhiana, UGC Center for Human Genome Studies.

== Awards and honours ==
1. Council Member, National Academy of Sciences, India, 2013–14
2. Council Member, Indian National Science Academy, 2014–16
3. Fellow, Indian National Science Academy, 2008
4. Goyal Prize for Physics, 2001 (Kurukshetra University).
5. Fellow, Punjab Academy of Sciences, 2001
6. Alexander von Humboldt Senior Fellowship Award, 1977.
7. Meghnad Saha Award for 1996 (awarded by UGC)
8. Senior Associate Member, the Abdus Salam International Centre for Theoretical Physics, Trieste, Italy, 1992–98.
9. Fellow, Indian Academy of Sciences, 1992.
10. UGC National Fellowship Award 1991.
11. UGC National Lecturer Award 1986–87.
12. Founder Member, Society for Scientific Values, New Delhi.
13. Fellow, National Academy of Sciences, 1983.
14. Associate Member, the Abdus Salam ICTP, Trieste, Italy, 1972–1977.
15. Post Doctoral Research Fellowship Award, National Research Council of Canada, 1967.

== Selected publications ==
1. Theory of Anharmonic Crystals, (K. N. Pathak) Phys. Rev. 139 A, 1569-1580 (1965).
2. Electron Correlation and Moment Sum Rules, (K. N. Pathak and P. Vashishta) Bull. Am. Phys. Soc. 17, 279 (1972) and Phys. Rev. B 7, 3649 (1973).
3. Sum Rules and Atomic Correlations in Classical Liquids, (Ravinder Bansal and K. N. Pathak) Phys. Rev. A 9, 2773 (1974).
4. Sum rules and Dynamical Properties of Two Dimensional Classical Electron Liquid, (G. K. Aggarwal and K. N. Pathak) J. Phys. C: Solid State Phys. 15, 5063 (1982).
5. Collective Motion in Classical Liquids, (K. N. Pathak and K.S. Singwi) Bull. Am. Phys. Soc. 15, 323 (1970) and Phys. Rev. A 2, 2427-2434 (1970).
6. Diamagnetic Susceptibility of an Interacting Electron Gas, (H. B. Singh and K. N. Pathak) Phys. Rev. B 11, 4246 (1975).
7. Collective Excitations in Liquid Rubidium, (P. K. Kahol, Ravinder Bansal and K. N. Pathak) Phys. Rev. A 14, 408 (1976).
8. Binary Collision Contributions to Atomic Motions in Fluids, (K. N. Pathak, S. Ranganathan and R. E. Johnson) Phys. Rev. E 50, 1135 (1994).
9. Self-diffusion coefficients of Lennard-Jones fluids (K Tankeshwar, K N Pathak and S Ranganathan)
10. One-dimensional electron fluid at high density (Vinod Ashokan, N. D. Drummond, K. N. Pathak) Phys. Rev.B . 98, 125139 (2018)
11. Exact ground-state properties of the one dimensional electron gas at high density (Vinod Ashokan, Renu Bala, Klaus Morawetz, and K. N. Pathak) Phys. Rev.B . 101, 075130 (2020)
