= R. S. Krishnan =

Indian scientist and researcher

R.S. Krishnan
- Born: 23 September 1911; Thrissur, Kingdom of Cochin, British Raj (now Kerala, India)
- Died: 2 October 1999 (aged 88); Bengaluru, Karnataka, India
- Education: St. Joseph's College, Tiruchirappalli; University of Cambridge
- Known for: Krishnan Effect
- Awards: C. V. Raman Prize; IISc Platinum Jubilee Distinguished Alumni Award
- Scientific career
- Fields: Colloids; Experimental physics
- Workplaces: Indian Institute of Science
- Doctoral advisor: C.V. Raman; Norman Feather
- Doctoral students: P. T. Narasimhan

Rappal Sangameswaran Krishnan (23 September 1911 – 2 October 1999) was an Indian experimental physicist and scientist. He was the Head of the department of Physics at the Indian Institute of Science and the vice chancellor of the University of Kerala. He is known for his pioneering researches on colloid optics and a discovery which is now known as Krishnan Effect. He was a Fellow of the Indian Academy of Sciences, Indian National Science Academy and the Institute of Physics, London and a recipient of the C. V. Raman Prize. 25 doctoral students were guided by Krishnan.

== Biography ==
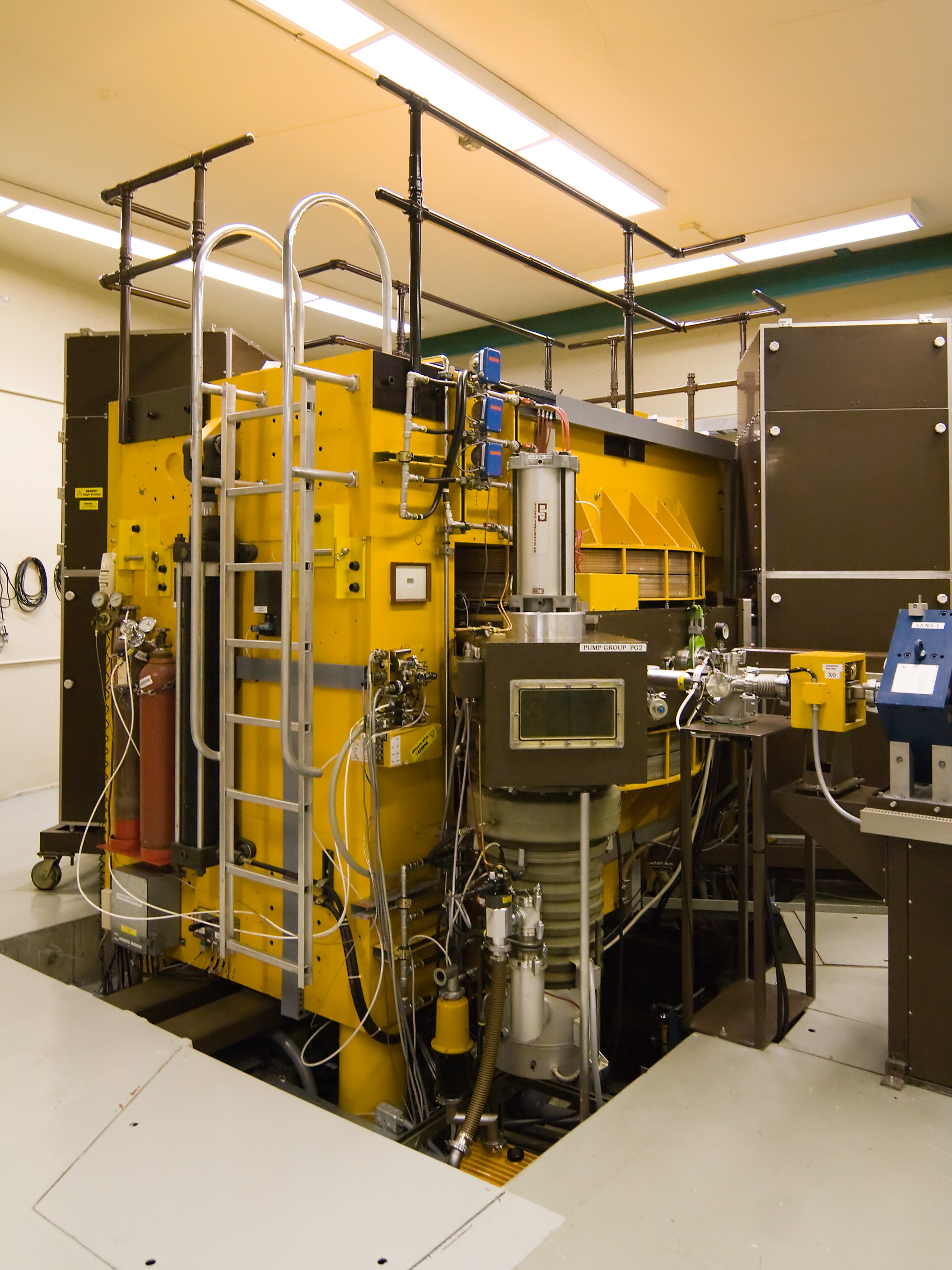
A modern Cyclotron.

Krishnan was born in a small village named Rappal, in Thrissur district, then in the Kingdom of Cochin and now in the South Indian state of Kerala on 22 September 1911. He did his early schooling at local schools and, securing a scholarship, joined St. Joseph's College, Tiruchirappalli from where he completed his bachelor's degree with honours (BA Hons.) and a first rank in 1933. He subsequently joined the Indian Institute of Science, Bangalore as a research student under the physics Nobel laureate Sir C. V. Raman. For his research, he received a doctorate from the University of Madras (DSc) in 1938, as the IISc did not then confer doctoral degrees. In 1938, he became a researcher at Cavendish Laboratory of Cambridge University under Sir John Cockcroft. His researches at Cambridge is reported to have assisted in the development of the 37’ Cyclotron and to the observation of deuteron-induced fission in uranium and thorium. The University awarded him PhD, in 1941, for his research work. He conducted his thesis research under Norman Feather, a colleague of Cockcroft's and also a student of Lord Rutherford.

Krishnan returned to India the same year and joined the Physics department of the Indian Institute of Sciences, Bangalore in 1942 where he returned to work under C.V. Raman's tutelage. After the retirement of Raman, Krishnan succeeded him as the Head of the Department of Physics in 1948. He served the institution till 1972 and, on his superannuation, he was appointed as the vice chancellor of the University of Kerala, Thiruvananthapuram in 1973 and held the position till 1977. He is known to have been active during his retirement life in Bengaluru, involved with the compilation of research publications on Raman Effect and publishing a number of articles. During this period, he served as a visiting scientist at the National Aerospace Laboratories (1987–90)and was an Emeritus Scientist of the Council of Scientific and Industrial Research (CSIR). He was married to Narayani Krishnan and he died on 2 October 1999, at the age of 88, at Bengaluru.

== Legacy ==
Working further on the Raman Effect, Krishnan discovered the reciprocity relations between the intensity of the horizontally polarised incident light getting scattered with horizontal polarization irrespective of the colloidal particles. This is known as Krishnan (reciprocity) Effect and the article was published in IISc journal on recommendation from C. V. Raman in 1936. He is credited with researches on Second Order Raman Spectra in diamond and in alkali halide crystals and is reported to have successfully recorded the phenomena for the first time, using the ultraviolet (mercury 2536 Å) technique of excitation for Raman spectroscopy, a technique he developed, on which he published a number of articles in peer reviewed journals. This is known to have provided conformation of Born's lattice dynamical theory. He was the first scientist to perform Brillouin scattering experiments in diamond, crystalline and fused quartz, alumina and alkali halides and is the author of a theory on Brillouin scattering in cubic and birefringent crystals, along with his student, Chandrasekhar. He also had documented investigations on thermal expansion, elastic constants and photoelastic constants of crystals and he initiated efforts on dating of Indian rock formations using nuclear geochronological techniques. He was the author of a monograph, two volumes of 'Source Book on Raman Effect' and contributed chapters to several scientific texts, besides delivering several orations.

Krishnan served as a member of the International Committee on Ferro-electricity and sat in the International Advisory Committee for Conferences on Raman Spectroscopy. He represented India in several international conferences and seminars such as the 2nd International Conference on Crystallography in Stockholm in 1951, the International Science Conference at Edinburgh, the 5th Australian Spectroscopic Conference, and the 1st International Conference on Raman Spectra on Crystals in Paris in 1965. His researches have been documented by way of over 500 articles published in peer reviewed national and international journals and over 60 research scholars were mentored by him, in their doctoral studies. Krishnan was a member of the council of the Indian Academy of Sciences from 1949 to 1955 and was its treasurer for a short period in 1955. He was also a member of the London Institute of Science, and the American Physical Society and was associated with several universities in Europe and the US, as a visiting professor.

== Awards and honours ==
The Indian Academy of Sciences elected Krishnan as a Fellow in 1944 and the Indian National Science Academy followed suit in 1950. He was also a fellow of the Institute of Physics, London and served as the president of the Physics Section of Indian Science Congress in 1949. He received the C. V. Raman Prize of the Indian Science Congress in 1988, four years after the Indian Institute of Science awarded him the 1984 Platinum Jubilee Distinguished Alumni Award.

== Selected bibliography ==
- S. P. S. Porto, R. S. Krishnan (1957). "Raman Effect of Conundrum". J. Chem. Phys. 47 (3): 1009–1012. Bibcode:1967JChPh..47.1009P. doi:10.1063/1.1711980.
- R. S. Krishnan (February 1936). "Scattering of light in optical glasses". Proc. Indian Acad. Sci. 3 (211): 211–220. doi:10.1007/BF03046252. S2CID 198139008.
- R. S. Krishnan (August 1947). "Second-Order Raman Spectra of Crystals". Nature. 160 (4059): 230–231. Bibcode:1947Natur.160..230K. doi:10.1038/160230a0. PMID 20256209. S2CID 4126866.
- R. S. Krishnan (July 1946). "The Second Order Raman Spectrum on Diamond". Proc. Indian Acad. Sci. 24 (1): 25–32. doi:10.1007/BF03170737. S2CID 91228159.

== See also ==
- R. S. Krishnan Higher Secondary School
- Raman Effect
