= Ranjan Mallik =

Indian electrical and communications engineer (born 1967)

- Born: 15 November 1964 (age 61); Kolkata, West Bengal, India
- Education: IIT Kanpur; University of Southern California
- Known for: Studies on multiple-input multi-output systems
- Awards: 2007 PRL Vikram Sarabhai Research Award; 2008 Shanti Swarup Bhatnagar Prize
- Scientific career
- Fields: Communications
- Workplaces: Defence Electronics Research Laboratory; IIT Kharagpur; IIT Guwahati; IIT Delhi

Ranjan Kumar Mallik (born 1964) is an Indian electrical and communications engineer and a professor at the Department of Electrical Engineering of the Indian Institute of Technology, Delhi. He held the Jai Gupta Chair at IIT Delhi from 2007 to 2012 and the Brigadier Bhopinder Singh Chair from 2012 to 2017. He is known for his researches on multiple-input multi-output systems and is an elected fellow of all the three major Indian science academies viz. Indian Academy of Sciences, Indian National Science Academy, and The National Academy of Sciences, India. He is also an elected fellow of The World Academy of Sciences, Indian National Academy of Engineering, and The Institute of Electrical and Electronics Engineers, Inc.

The Council of Scientific and Industrial Research, the apex agency of the Government of India for scientific research, awarded him the Shanti Swarup Bhatnagar Prize for Science and Technology, one of the highest Indian science awards for his contributions to Engineering Sciences in 2008. (Note: Long link - please select award year to see details)

== Biography ==
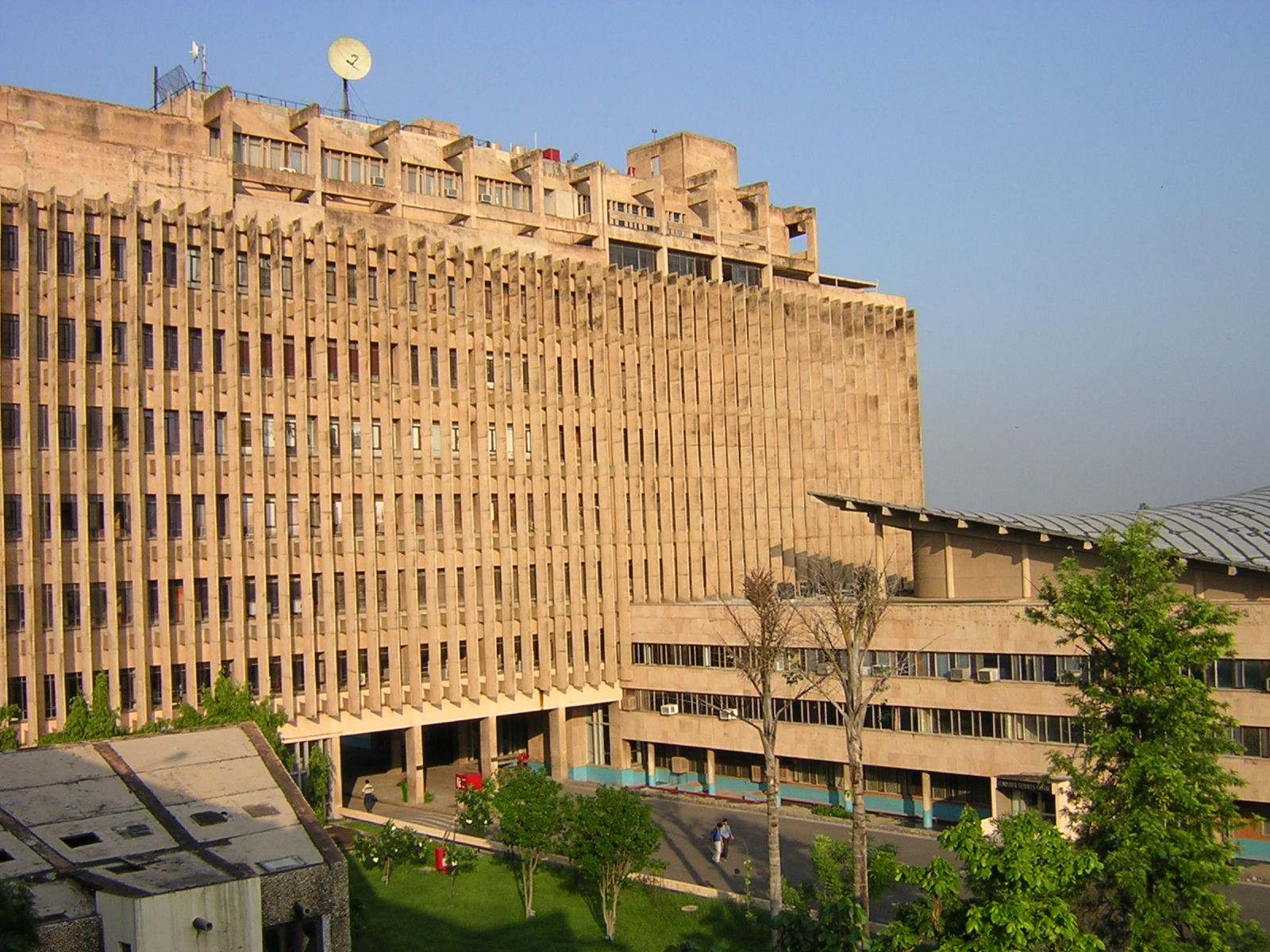
IIT Delhi

R. K. Mallik, born in November 1964 in Kolkata, the capital city of the Indian state of West Bengal, to Radharaman Mallik and Tapati, earned a BTech in electrical engineering from the Indian Institute of Technology, Kanpur in 1987. His higher studies were at the University of Southern California from where he completed an MS in electrical engineering in 1988 and followed it up with a PhD in 1992. Returning to India, he joined Defence Electronics Research Laboratory, Hyderabad the same year as a Grade C Scientist and worked there for two years till his move to the Indian Institute of Technology, Kharagpur in 1994 as a lecturer. His stay at IIT Kharagpur lasted till 1996 during which period he served as an assistant professor during 1995–96. His next move was to the Indian Institute of Technology, Guwahati as an assistant professor and in 1998 he shifted his base to Delhi to join the Indian Institute of Technology, Delhi where he serves as a professor in the Department of Electrical Engineering. In between, he held the IDRC Research Chair in Wireless Communications from 2009 to 2015, the Jai Gupta Chair from 2007 to 2012, and the Brigadier Bhopinder Singh Chair from 2012 to 2017. He is also associated with Bharti School of Telecommunication Technology and Management of IIT Delhi as a faculty.

Mallik is married to Sumona DasGupta and the couple has one child, Upamanyu.

== Legacy ==
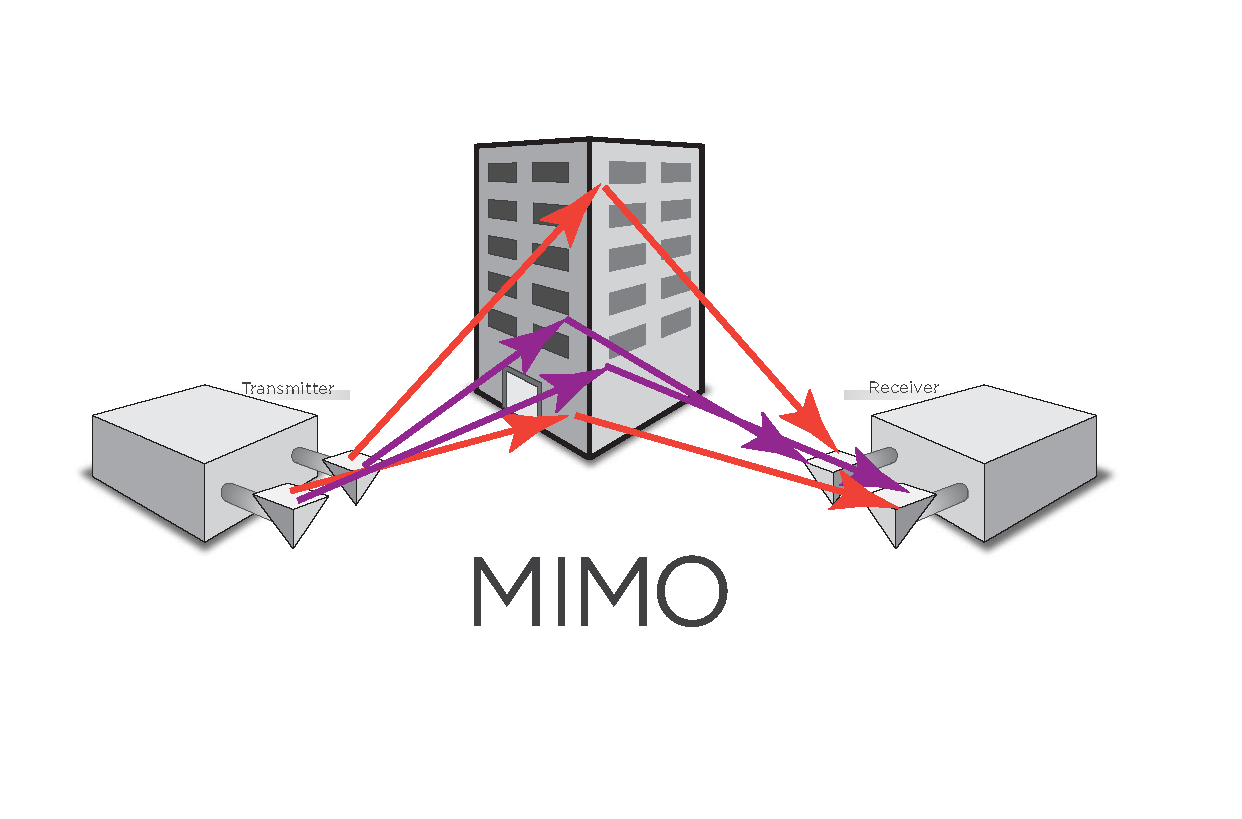
MIMO - graphical representation

Mallik's researches have been in the fields of communication theory and systems, difference equations, and linear algebra and he has worked extensively on the performance analysis of multiple-input multi-output systems, especially characterization of fading channel statistics and error analysis under correlated fading conditions. He has documented his researches by way of several articles; (Note: Please see Selected bibliography section) Google Scholar and ResearchGate, online article repositories of scientific articles, have listed many of them. Besides, he has contributed chapters to books including the 2011 edition of Issues in Telecommunications Research published by ScholarlyEditions.

Mallik is a member of the Program Advisory Committee on Electrical, Electronics and Computer Engineering of the Science and Engineering Research Board of the Department of Science and Technology. He is a former treasurer (2005 and 2006) of the Delhi Section of The Institute of Electrical and Electronics Engineers, Inc. (IEEE) and served as a member of IEEE Communications Society's Awards Standing Committee during 2015-2017. He is a founder member of the Communication Systems and Networks Association (COMSNETS) and has contributed to the organizing of several conferences. The invited or key note speeches delivered by him include the lecture on Performance Evaluation and Channel Characterization for Wireless Communication System at National Science day (2009), the address on Optimal Signaling for Multi-Level Amplitude-Shift Keying with Single-Input Multiple-Output and Non-coherent Reception at CALCON (2014), Alexander Graham Bell lecture of IEEE (2015), and the keynote speech at IEEE Patna 5G Summit (2016).

== Awards and honors ==
Mallik became an elected fellow of the National Academy of Sciences, India in 2007. He received the Hari Om Ashram Prerit Dr. Vikram Sarabhai Research Award in electronics, telematics, informatics, and automation of the Physical Research Laboratory in 2008 and the Council of Scientific and Industrial Research awarded him the Shanti Swarup Bhatnagar Prize, one of the highest Indian science awards the same year. The Indian National Science Academy elected him as a fellow in 2011 and the Indian Academy of Sciences followed suit a year later. In addition, the years 2012 and 2013 brought him two elected fellowships; that of The World Academy of Sciences and The Institute of Electrical and Electronics Engineers, Inc., respectively. He is also an elected fellow of The Institution of Engineering and Technology and the Indian National Academy of Engineering.

== Selected bibliography ==
- Mallik, R. K. (2006). "Optimized diversity combining with imperfect channel estimation". IEEE Transactions on Information Theory. 52 (3): 1176–1184. doi:10.1109/TIT.2005.864444. S2CID 1122080.
- Mallik, R. K.; Zhang, Q. T. (2007). "A tight upper bound on the PEP of a space-time coded system". IEEE Transactions on Wireless Communications. 6 (9): 3238–3247. doi:10.1109/TWC.2007.051066. S2CID 23865064.
- Mallik, R. K.; Winters, J. H. (2008). "Optimum receiver for a realistic transmit-receive diversity system in correlated fading". IEEE Transactions on Information Theory. 54 (12): 5456–5468. doi:10.1109/TIT.2008.2006444. S2CID 13087804.
- Yi, Shi; Jiaheng, Wang; Letaief, K.; Mallik, R. (2009). "A game-theoretic approach for distributed power control in interference relay channels". IEEE Transactions on Wireless Communications. 8 (6): 3151–3161. doi:10.1109/TWC.2009.080831. S2CID 24765369.
- Sagias, N. C.; Mallik, R. K.; Tombras, G. S. (2010). "Error rate performance of multilevel signals with coherent detection". IEEE Transactions on Communications. 58 (8): 2188–2192. doi:10.1109/TCOMM.2010.08.090262. S2CID 10029202.

== See also ==
- Arogyaswami Paulraj
- Thomas Kailath
- Gregory Raleigh
- Gerard J. Foschini
- MIMO-OFDM
- Single-input single-output system
