= Narayanan Chandrakumar =

Indian chemical physicist and professor

- Born: 25 November 1951 (age 74); Tamil Nadu, India
- Education: Loyola College, Chennai; IIT Madras; IIT Kanpur; Central Leather Research Institute
- Known for: Studies on rotating frame coherence transfer and Nuclear magnetic resonance
- Awards: 1985 Bruker Young Scientist Award; 1987 CSIR Young Scientist Award; 1996 Shanti Swarup Bhatnagar Prize; 1996 CSIR New Idea Fund Award; 2000 ISCA Millennium Medal; 2008 CRSI Silver Medal
- Scientific career
- Fields: Chemical physics; Nuclear magnetic resonance
- Workplaces: IIT Madras; JEOL; National Institutes of Health; University of Siegen; University of Göttingen; University of Ulm; INSERM, Grenoble
- Doctoral advisor: P. T. Narasimhan

Narayanan Chandrakumar (born 25 November 1951) is an Indian chemical physicist and a professor of chemistry at the Indian Institute of Technology, Madras. He was the founder of the first Nuclear magnetic resonance (NMR) laboratory in India and is known for developing a new technique for NMR imaging and diffusion measurement. He is an elected fellow of the Indian National Science Academy and the Indian Academy of Sciences. The Council of Scientific and Industrial Research, the apex agency of the Government of India for scientific research, awarded him the Shanti Swarup Bhatnagar Prize for Science and Technology, one of the highest Indian science awards, in 1996, for his contributions to chemical sciences.

== Biography ==
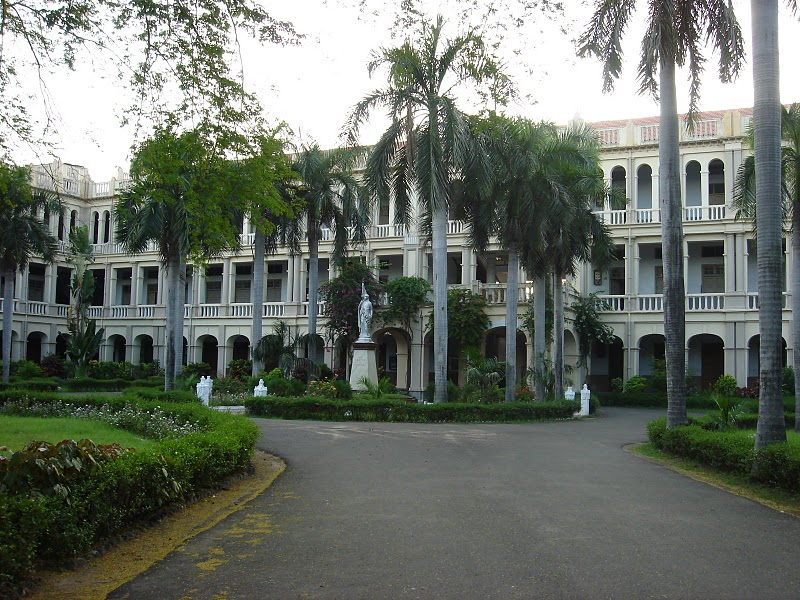
Loyola College, Chennai

N. Chandrakumar, born on 25 November 1951, in the south Indian state of Tamil Nadu, graduated in chemistry from Loyola College, Chennai in 1970 and completed his master's degree at IIT Madras in 1972. His doctoral studies were at IIT Kanpur under the guidance of P. T. Narasimhan, a Shanti Swarup Bhatnagar laureate, which he completed in 1979 and joined Central Leather Research Institute (CLRI) as a research associate in 1980. He served the institute till 2001, holding positions such as that of a scientist, head of the Physical Sciences Division and a director-grade scientist and moved to IIT Madras where he is a professor at the department of chemistry. In between, he served as visiting scientist at JEOL, National Institutes of Health (1986), and at University of Siegen (1993). He also had visiting professorships at University of Ulm (1997–98) and INSERM, Grenoble (2001).

== Legacy ==
Chandrakumar joined as a Scientist in the Chemical Science Lab and set up an 90 MHz NMR spectrometer at Central Leather Research Institute. Upon joining IIT Madras, he set up an NMR facility with MRS and MRI to pursue his research at IIT Madras. He is the inventor of one of the NMR imaging techniques for diffusion measurements and has done studies on rotating frame coherence transfer and multiple quantum NMR, high resolution spin-1 NMR and spin-1 connectivity mapping. He holds seven patents for the processes he has developed. His researches have been detailed in two monographs, Modern techniques in high-resolution FT-NMR and Spin-1 NMR and several articles published in peer-reviewed journals. ResearchGate, an online article repository, has listed 85 of them. He has also edited the journals Magnetic Resonance, Diamond Jubilee Special Issue of the Proceedings (Chemical Sciences) of the Indian Academy of Sciences. He has also supervised several doctoral scholars in their studies.

== Awards and honors ==
Chadrakumar received the Bruker Young Scientist Award in 1985. Two years later, he received the Young Scientist Award of the Council of Scientific and Industrial Research in its first issue in 1987. CSIR honored him again in 1996 with the New Idea Fund Award and the Shanti Swarup Bhatnagar Prize, one of the highest Indian science awards, in 1996. He was awarded the Millennium Medal by the Indian Science Congress Association in 2000 and the Chemical Research Society of India awarded him the Silver Medal in 2008. The award orations he has delivered include Professor R. K. Asundi Memorial Lecture (2002), the Professor K. Rangadhama Rao Memorial Lecture (2004) of the Indian National Science Academy and the Professor N. Venkatasubramanian Endowment Lecture (2003). The Indian Academy of Sciences elected him as their fellow in 1993 and he became a fellow of the Indian National Science Academy in 1997. He also held the INSA-DFG Exchange Fellowship in 1988, Fellowship of the Max Planck Gesellschaft in 1989 and, 1990, INSA Visiting Fellowship for MRI / MRS Research at AIIMS in 1994, Honorary Senior Fellowship of the Jawaharlal Nehru Center for Advanced Scientific Research in 1997 and the J. C. Bose National Fellowship in 2009.

== See also ==
- P. T. Narasimhan
- Nuclear magnetic resonance
