= Srinivasa Ramanujan Institute for Basic Sciences =

Indian research institute

Srinivasa Ramanujan Institute for Basic Sciences is an institute set up Government of Kerala, India, in Trivandrum as an R&D institution under Kerala State Council for Science, Technology and Environment (KSCSTE) for the promotion research in basic sciences. The decision to create the institution was taken by Government of Kerala as part of the 125th birth anniversary celebrations of the legendary Indian mathematical genius Srinivasa Ramanujan and the formation of the institute was announced by Oommen Chandy, Chief Minister of Kerala, on 13 January 2012. The institute was formally inaugurated on 7 February 2013. The institute started functioning in its permanent campus at Pampady, Kottayam from October 2025. Dr. Suresh C. H. was appointed as the first director of SRIBS in April 2024, who is on deputation from National Institute for Interdisciplinary Science and Technology (NIIST) Thiruvananthapuram. Since its inception, the institute has been organising various academic programmes like colloquia and workshops on a regular basis.
