= Muktesh Pant =

Indian businessman (born 1954)

Muktesh "Micky" Pant
- Born: 1954 (age 71–72); Almora, India
- Education: Indian Institute of Technology Kanpur
- Occupations: Former CEO, Yum China

Muktesh "Micky" Pant (born 1954) is an Indian-American marketing executive with a career in the global consumer goods and food industries. He is the former CEO of Yum China and Reebok India.

== Education ==
Pant graduated with a B.Tech. in chemical engineering from the Indian Institute of Technology, Kanpur, India, where he later received the Distinguished Alumnus Award (2010) and the Institute Fellow 2022 Award (2023).

== Career ==
Pant started his career in the marketing department of Hindustan Lever in 1976, spending 15 years in marketing roles. He then worked for PepsiCo India from 1992 to 1994, followed by a significant tenure at Reebok, where he helped found Reebok India – Pant was employee number 1. After a stint as global Chief Marketing Officer at Reebok, Pant became chief marketing officer at Yum! Brands in 2005. In this capacity, Pant was responsible for overseeing marketing practices at the world's largest fast food restaurant company. He was CEO of Yum Restaurants International, Global CEO of KFC, and President of Taco Bell International. He played a pivotal role in Yum China’s spin-off from Yum! Brands.

After retiring from Yum China in 2018, Pant was Vice Chairman and Senior Advisor until 2020. He also consulted for Beyond Meat in 2020 and has been on the boards of companies, including Beyond Meat, Pinnacle Foods, Primavera Capital Acquisition, and Las Vegas Sands Corp.

Through the Micky and Vinita Pant Charitable Fund, he supports medical research, rural development, and hospital construction in India, as well as cancer research in the U.S. Pant has lived in India, the UK, the U.S., and China, and resides in Washington, D.C.
