= Sirshendu De =

Indian engineering scientist (born 1967)

- Born: Sirshendu De; 10 July 1967 (age 59); Kolkata, India
- Citizenship: Indian
- Known for: Membrane Separations; R&D; Innovation
- Awards: Shanti Swarup Bhatnagar
- Scientific career
- Fields: Chemical Engineering
- Workplaces: IIT Kharagpur

Sirshendu De (born 10 July 1967) is an Indian engineering scientist. He is a professor of the Department of Chemical Engineering at the Indian Institute of Technology in Kharagpur.

De obtained his Bachelor's, Master's and PhD degrees in Chemical Engineering at the Indian Institute of Technology in Kanpur. He began working at the Indian Institute of Technology in Kharagpur in the year 1998.

== Awards ==
De's honors in chemical engineering include the Amar Dye Chem Award (2000), the INAE Young Engineer Award (2001), the Sisir Kumar Mitra Memorial Award (2003), and the Herdilia Award (2010). In 2012, he received the DAE-SRC Outstanding Investigator Award and the Silver Jubilee Young Engineer Award. In 2011, he was awarded the Shanti Swarup Bhatnagar Prize for Science and Technology.

He developed a low-cost arsenic water filter designed for use in rural Indian households. As of 2026, De has published more than 250 peer-reviewed articles and authored eight books. He holds 15 patents and has transferred four technologies to industrial partners for commercial application. His work has been cited over 3,400 times.
