= Anuradha Misra =

Indian Scientist

Head of the Department of Physics, University of Mumbai

Personal details
- Born: Faizabad, Uttar Pradesh
- Education: University of Allahabad; IIT Kanpur
- Known for: Theoretical high energy physics

Anuradha Misra is a retired professor and the former head of the department of physics at the University of Mumbai. She was born in Faizabad, Uttar Pradesh, India. A graduate of the University of Allahabad, she joined as a research associate for physics at the University of Mumbai in 1994. She specializes in the study of theoretical high energy physics, including Light front quantization, resummation in quantum chromodynamics.

== Early life, education and career ==
Misra completed her primary education from Government Girls College in Faizabad, Uttar Pradesh. She did her bachelor's degree in mathematics, physics, and statistics, from the University of Allahabad, masters in physics from IIT Kanpur in 1983. Being inspired by the works of physicist Marie Curie and mathematician Srinivasa Ramanujan, she pursued a doctorate at IIT Kanpur. Her research was in the areas of chiral anomaly, trace anomaly and Stress–energy tensor in 1989.

She published papers on renormalization theory under the guidance of S. D. Joglekar. Her first research paper was under the guidance of George Sterman, an American theoretical physicist at the Stony Brook University. She took up her first job at Saha Institute of Nuclear Physics as a research associate. In 1993, she moved to the United States to work at Stony Brook University as a lecturer. She returned to India in 1994 and spent a brief time in Allahabad before joining as research associate at the University of Mumbai in October 1994. She continued her research on high energy physics, quantum chromodynamics and light front field theories. In November 2008, she was promoted to be a professor and appointed the head of the department of physics, a position which she held from 2013 to 2016, and again from 2019 to present (Mar 2020).

== Personal life ==
Misra was born in Faizabad, Uttar Pradesh, India in a family of ten children. Her father was a doctor. She has been married to Raghava Varma, her classmate from IIT Kanpur. He works at the Indian Institute of Technology Bombay as a professor of Physics. The couple has two sons.

== Publications ==
She has published several journal articles. Her co-authors include Satish D. Joglekar, Swati Warwadekar, Rohini M. Godbole, Patrick Motylinski, and Jai D. More. Her publications are:

- Coherent states in null-plane QED, Anuradha Misra, D50, 4088 (1994) doi:10.1103/PhysRevD.50.4088
- Discretized light cone quantization and the coherent state basis, Anuradha Misra, D53, 5874 (1996) doi:10.1103/PhysRevD.53.5874
- Energy-momentum tensor in scalar QED, Satish D. Joglekar, Anuradha Misra, D38, 2546 (1988) doi:10.1103/PhysRevD.38.2546
- Method of Asymptotic Dynamics in Light-Front Field Theory, Anuradha Misra, Few-Body Systems, Vol.36, 2001 (2005)
- Equivalence of Covariant and Light-front QED at One Loop Level, Anuradha Misra, and Swati Warwadekar, Phys. Rev. D71, 125011 (2005)
- Sivers effect and transverse single spin asymmetry in e+ p↑→ e+ J/ψ+ X, Rohini M. Godbole, Anuradha Misra, Asmita Mukherjee, Vaibhav S. Rawoot, D85, 094013 (2005) doi:10.1103/PhysRevD.85.094013
- Soft Collinear Effects in Prompt Photon Production, Rahul Basu, Eric Laenen, Anuradha Misra and Patrick Motylinski, Phys. Rev. D76, 014010 (2007) doi:10.1103/PhysRevD.76.014010
- Equivalence of covariant and light front QED: Generating instantaneous diagrams Swati M. Patel and Anuradha Misra, Phys.Rev. D82, 125024 (2010) doi:10.1103/PhysRevD.82.125024
- Transverse single spin asymmetry in e+ p↑→ e+ J/ψ+ X and transverse momentum dependent evolution of the Sivers function, Rohini M. Godbole, Anuradha Misra, Asmita Mukherjee, Vaibhav S. Rawoot, D88, 014029 (2013) doi:10.1103/PhysRevD.88.014029
- Fermion self-energy correction in light-front QED using coherent state basis, Jai D. More, Anuradha Misra, D87, 085035 (2013) doi:10.1103/PhysRevD.87.085035
