= Smart Grid Energy Research Center =

Next-gen Smart Grid tech organization

Coordinates: 34.0688°N 118.4440°W

UCLA Smart Grid Energy Research Center (SMERC)
- Established: 2010
- Affiliations: UCLA
- Director: Rajit Gadh
- Location: Los Angeles, California
- Website: Official website

The UCLA Smart Grid Energy Research Center (SMERC), located on the University of California Los Angeles (UCLA) campus, is an organization focused on developing the technologies for Smart grid. SMERC partners includes government agencies, technology providers, Department of Energy (DOE) research labs, universities, utilities, policymakers, electric vehicle manufacturers, and appliance manufacturers.

Currently, SMERC is performing research on Microgrids, automated demand response, electric vehicle integration (G2V, or Grid-to-Vehicle and V2G, or Vehicle-to-Grid), Cybersecurity, and distributed and renewable integration.

SMERC has partnerships with USC and Caltech/Jet Propulsion Laboratory (JPL), and LADWP in a smart grid demonstration project. Internationally, SMERC has collaborated with the Korea Institute of Energy Research (KIER). This partnership involves SMERC testing and developing software and platforms related to smart grid technology, while KIER focuses on multiple renewable energy technologies, such as solar, wind, and fuel cells, as well as wireless communications and semiconductor systems.

== Background ==
"While the electrical grid in the United States is very reliable, it is currently somewhat limited in its ability to incorporate new renewable energy sources, effectively manage demand response, sense and monitor trouble spots, and repair itself." This reliability will not last if the grid systems stay the same as populations and electricity demands rise. This demand warrants new technologies and systems to provide and manage demand response, sensory/monitor repair, and self-repair to help stabilize the grid. SMERC has been building these technologies since the fall of 2004. The system also calls for better efficiency among energy generators and savers. Currently, the main grid in North America is up to 100 years old, and thus needs to be updated to handle the intermittency of renewable energy sources (solar power, wind turbines, etc.).

== Funding ==
The first major act in updating the current grid was the U.S. Department of Energy's (DOE) stimulus package (American Recovery and Reinvestment Act, i.e. ARRA). The ARRA invested approximately $4.4 billion on Smart Grid research. LADWP received $60 million from the DOE's stimulus package.

The Waxman–Markley comprehensive energy bill (American Clean Energy and Security Act of 2009) increased the public knowledge and impact on the electric transmission grid. The act was designed with the stated intention to reduce greenhouse emissions by 17 percent by 2020. This reduction would require there to be a concentration on energy consumption and production. Collaborations among utilities, government, technology providers, and universities are made being to provide information and technologies for new Smart Grid and Smart Energy Technology to reach this goal.

SMERC also receives funding from California Energy Commission, EPRI, KIER, and the UCLA Smart Grid Industry Partners Program(SMERC-IPP).

== Projects ==
The Smart Grid Energy Research Center (SMERC) consists of several key projects as follows:

=== Connected and Autonomous Electric Vehicles (CAEV) ===
CAEVTM is a UCLA-led consortium whose members consist of automotive companies, electric and autonomous transportation providers, and electric power companies who are attempting to change the automotive industry into one that is electric, digital, connected, "smart", autonomous, and serves the growing transportation and energy needs of society for the 21st century and beyond. The purpose of the consortium is to create a partnership of Electric Vehicle and autonomous vehicle manufacturers in California, partnering with newer energy companies.

=== UCLA WINSmart Grid ===
"The UCLA WINSmartGridTM is a network platform technology that allows electricity-operated appliances such as plug-in automobiles, washers, dryers, or air conditioners to be wirelessly monitored, connected, and controlled via a smart wireless hub."

The WINSmartGridTM technology uses a Serviceware architecture along with ReWINS technology, divided into three parts:

The edgeware controls and utilizes the wireless technology networks and the creation, management, set-up, and maintenance of software and firmware. It connects with RFID tags, motion detectors, temperature monitors, or 10X controllers on refrigerators. Within the WINSmartGridTM hub, a variety of monitors and sensors are supported that the Edgeware has connections to, including humidity, current, voltage, power, shock, motion, chemicals, etc. This hub is capable of supporting wireless protocols (e.g., WiFi, Bluetooth, Zigbee, GPRS, and RFID). The most efficient protocols seem to be low-power protocols such as Zigbee.

The Middleware is the "middle man" between the Edgeware and the Centralware. Capable of providing functions such as data filtration, extraction of information, aggregation and messaging of data from the Edgeware, and distribution of the information to the proper destination or web service accordingly.

The Centralware is the decision-making web service, it receives all information, calculates what some optimal decisions are based on rules, and carries out the execution of these decisions. Currently, the WINSmartGridTM Centralware is running on a basic set of rules, whereas it will eventually work with external services as they begin to come online.

=== Automated Demand Response (ADR) ===
“The Automated Demand-Response (ADR) programs shows control models and secure messaging schemes, automation in load curtailment, leveraging multiple communication technologies, and maintaining interoperability between the Smart Grid automation architecture layers.”

SMERC is in the process of creating a test area that would provide information on consumers’ energy usage and the distribution of that energy from a utility service. The test beds are located on the UCLA campus which will serve as a living lab for demonstration of ADR concepts. Since UCLA produces 75% of its own energy through its natural gas power plant, the campus is a desirable place for conducting ADR research and demonstration.

ADR will require control technology components and sub-systems that will work with security features and protocols in culmination with operational parameters. Advanced Metering Infrastructure (AMI) will also be checked for proper ability in terms of data volume and networking aspects. Further requirements such as rate design models, system-wide data and metadata modeling, etc. will be used to guide the system architecture The Demand-Response system provides an efficient service to utility systems and consumers. It is based on a service-oriented architecture (SOA) that would use information from the utility systems' technical evaluations and requirements to help assist integration modalities for backend utility systems. Through this architecture, collaboration among the entire network involving billing, metering, and distribution, can be accomplished. Consumers are able to make requests, and a supervisory control system will monitor the consumer's demands ond make the best projected decisions. This demand-response system will also be represented by various types of energy customers (e.g. commercial, residential, industrial). With the WINSmartGrid technology, transactions will be communicated through wireless technologies to convey common data payloads. Currently, SOA in conjunction with open embedded system scan provide support for plug-and-play and secure-demand-response. Also, an application programming interface (API) provides customizability and extensibility to the system.

The test beds use automation technologies and will provide demonstration of the systems functionality, communication fidelity and reliability, testing of data, protocols, etc. These technologies are AMI-DR models, hardware and software interfaces, software architecture, access control policies, recommended security schemes and algorithms, and desired set of optimizations.

The testing phase could provide detailed performance on the demand-response processes and technology components or sub-systems where efficient changes and predictions can be made to fulfill a targeted load curtailment and consumer demands.

The test beds for the current research will have a "network platform that enables appliances such as plug-in electric vehicles, washers, dryers and air conditioners to be wirelessly monitored, connected, and controlled through a wireless communications framework. These test bed arrangements will provide vital research on the demand-response systems."

=== Electric vehicle integration into the grid ===
Currently, technology within SMERC is being used and built for the program WINSmartEV. It focuses on the integration of both wireless and RF-monitoring and control technologies. EV technology provides a more energy-efficient, economical, and user friendly smart technology for charging an EV. Several parking structures on the UCLA campus now provide EV charging to its members. These stations are monitored by SMERC's software systems in the Engineering Department. All data regarding these charging stations is collected by members of the SMERC team to evaluate tendencies and requests of its users. This data will be evaluated to provide the stations 'users with the best possible management of charging their EV.

WINSmartEV's main objective is to increase the stability of the local power system and reduce energy cost by managing all operations conducted in charging an EV. The most recent implementation developed allows for several EVs to charge at one charging station while receiving different, yet controllable current. This type of charging system will provide the user with the vast flexibility towards charging an EV. This system provides the user with conveniences pertaining to parking, price, time limits, and power consumption.

Another objective for the WINSmartEV program wirelessly gathering inmation from the electric grid and EV to the determine more efficient charging capabilities for the EV. With the proper management of EV’s, charging and backfill operations can be used to lower electricity rates and flatten the load curve.

User interface allows the EV owner to have the capability of controlling where, when, why, and how to charge their vehicle. An EV user may use a handheld device to view a map of charging stations, schedule an exact time charge, start and stop charge at any convenience, and this all could be done from a single touch on a Smsrtphone or other handheld devices. Also, if necessary or requested, an alert can be issued to the driver when the battery capacity is low and needs charging.

SMERC evaluates EVs and charging stations patterns in order to determine the appropriate wireless technologies and sensor modules that are best for installation. In conclusion, integrating the EVs with WINSmardGrid the local AMI and Demand-Response will provide communication and alerting systems for WINSmartETM.

=== Cyber Security project ===
The electricity distribution systems are becoming drastically more complex and more dynamic, while the power grid is in the transition to the smart grid. The deployment of distributed energy resources (DERs) such as solar panels and energy storage devices is proliferating. Numerous inputs and controls are pushed and pulled from various advanced distribution grid platforms. Some of the inputs and controls connect the grid resources to the public Internet. Improved sensing, communication, and control capabilities have the capability to enormously enhance the performance of the electric grid, but at the cost of increased vulnerabilities to deliberate attacks and accidental failures, threatening the grid’s functionality and reliability. EV charging system that connects to the smart grid is considered as an information network with a massive communication among utility, EV and DER control centers, EV supply equipment (EVSE), and power meters. As EV charging consumes a lot of power and thus can have a considerable impact on a distribution system, the cybersecurity on fhe EV charging domain is as critical as a distribution grid.

The ongoing research project titled “UC-Lab Center for Electricity Distribution Cybersecurity,” which is currently sponsored by UCLRP (UCOP LFR-18-548175) has bring together a multi-disciplinary UC-Lab team of cybersecurity and electricity infrastructure experts to investigate the impact of cyberattacks on electricity distribution infrastructure and develop new strategies for mitigation of vulnerabilities, detection of intrusion, and protection against detrimental system-wide impact.

The SMERC team focuses on the cybersecurity for the EV charging network, including system vulnerability analysis, risk assessment, and the impacts of cyber-attacks, as well as anomaly detection.

The team has researched the vulnerability analysis and risk assessment for the smart charging infrastructure based on the charging system on the UCLA campus, which is called WINSmartEV. The research has outlined a codified methodology and taxonomy for assessing vulnerability and risk of cyber-physical attacks on the EV charging networks to create a generalizable and comprehensive solution. For the anomaly detection, the team analyzes the multidimensional time-series data, including building load, solar generation, dynamic electricity price, and EV load, within the WINSmartEV. The objective is to characterize the regular EV charging operation to establish a correlation-invariant network, thereby identifying anomalies or malicious data injection, which disturbs the correlations within the system.

=== Other projects ===
Other projects in beginning stages or current development in the SMERC are Battery storage integration with renewable solar, EV to solar integration, V2G, Cyber Security Testing, Wireless Monitoring and Control of the grid, Microgrid modeling and control, Autonomous Electric Vehicles, Home Area Networks and Consumer Issue in EV Integration and DR.

== Recent news and events ==
SMERC has hosted several events both inside and outside UCLA with notable speakers from both academia and industry. Notable locations of seminars and panel discussions include Shanghai Jiao Tong University, Indian Institutes of Technology, and at the California State Capitol Building in Sacramento. The director of the lab, Dr. Rajit Gadh, has been quoted in notable articles such as Fast Company, and his activity includes meeting with the director of The Energy and Resources Institute and appearances in various events such as the Intercharge Network Conference in 2018. In addition, every year there is an Electric and Autonomous Transportation UCLA CAEV Annual Conference where the electric vehicle industry is discussed. Other notable events include the Workshop on Technology Trends in Transportation and Electricity, Artificial Intelligence and Autonomous Systems: Technology Innovations and Business Opportunities, and Distributed Energy Resources (DER)—EV, PV and Storage—for a Modern Grid.
