= Sanjib Senapati =

Indian biophysicist and biochemist

- Born: West Bengal, India
- Education: University of Calcutta; Indian Institute of Technology Kanpur
- Known for: Studies in protein dynamics, green chemistry and nanoclusters
- Awards: 2015 N-BIOS Prize
- Scientific career
- Fields: Biophysics; Biochemistry; Biotechnology
- Workplaces: Indian Institute of Technology Madras

Sanjib Senapati is an Indian biophysicist, biochemist, biotechnologist and a professor at the Bhupat and Jyoti Mehta School of Biosciences, Department of Biotechnology of the Indian Institute of Technology Madras. He is known for his studies in the fields of protein dynamics, green chemistry and nanoclusters and is a Fulbright scholar. The Department of Biotechnology of the Government of India awarded him the National Bioscience Award for Career Development, one of the highest Indian science awards, for his contributions to biosciences, in 2015.

== Biography ==
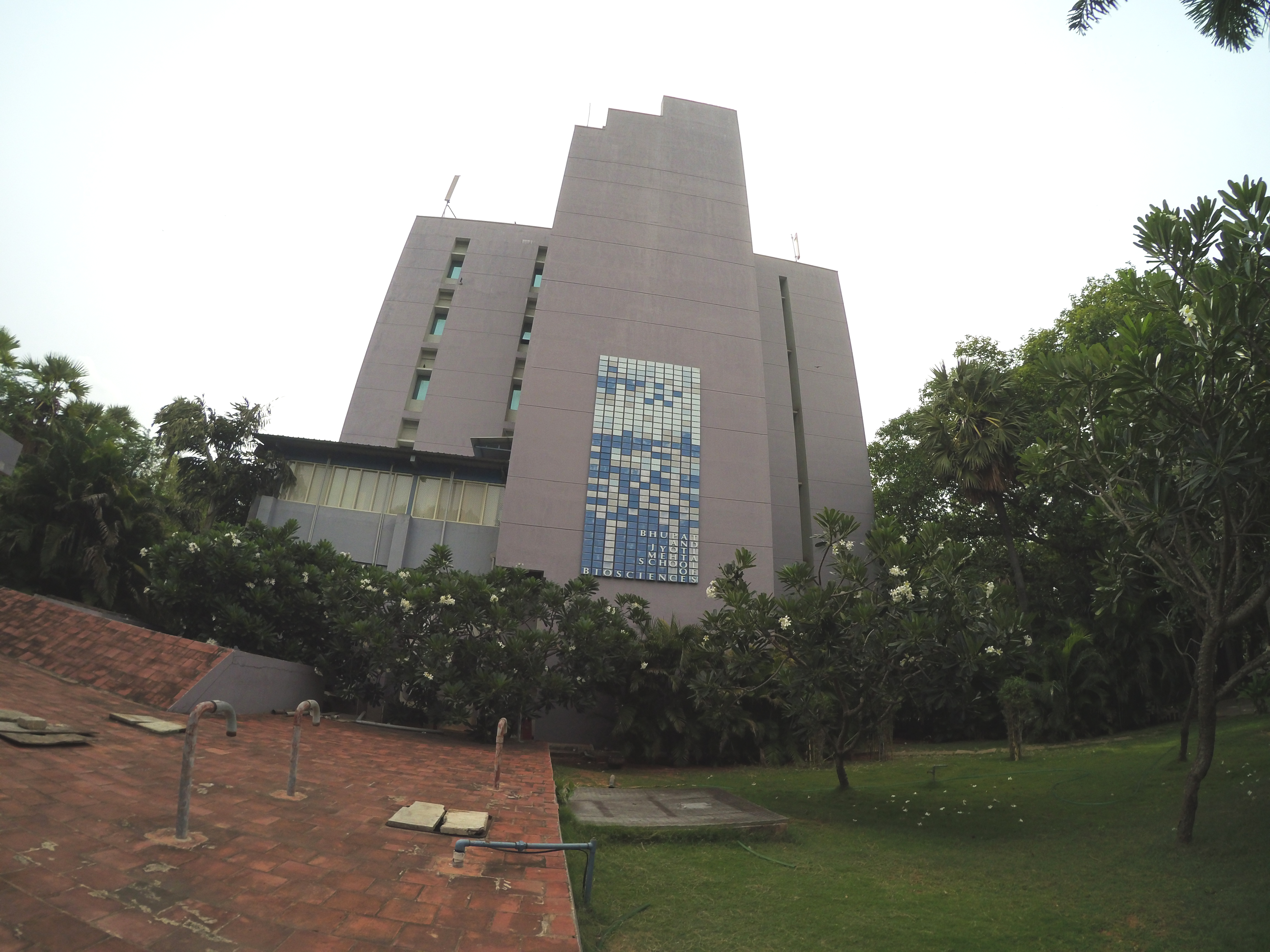
Bhupat and Jyoti Mehta School of Biosciences, IIT Madras

Born in the Indian state of West Bengal, Sanjib Senapati secured his master's degree from the University of Calcutta and did his doctoral studies at the Indian Institute of Technology Kanpur which earned him a PhD. Subsequently, he joined the Indian Institute of Technology Madras (IITM) as a faculty member of the department of biotechnology and holds the position of a professor at the Bhupat and Jyoti Mehta School of Biosciences at IITM. The team led by him focuses their research in the fields of protein dynamics, green chemistry and nanoclusters. His studies have been documented by way of a number of articles (Note: Please see Selected bibliography section) and Google Scholar, an online repository of scientific articles has listed 110 of them.

The Department of Biotechnology (DBT) of the Government of India awarded Senapati the National Bioscience Award for Career Development, one of the highest Indian science awards in 2015. In 2017, he was selected for the Fulbright Scholarship program by the United States Department of State Bureau of Educational and Cultural Affairs for working on a project at the laboratory of Andrej Šali of the University of California, San Francisco, during 2017–18.

== Selected bibliography ==
- Pratap Singh, Akhil; Sithambaram, Devilakshmi; Sanghavi, Rutvi; Kumar Gupta, Piyush; Shanker Verma, Rama; Doble, Mukesh; Gardas, Ramesh L.; Senapati, Sanjib (2017). "Environmentally benign tetramethylguanidinium cation based ionic liquids". New J. Chem. 41 (20): 12268–12277. doi:10.1039/c7nj03167j.
- Appadurai, Rajeswari; Senapati, Sanjib (2 March 2016). "Dynamical Network of HIV-1 Protease Mutants Reveals the Mechanism of Drug Resistance and Unhindered Activity". Biochemistry. 55 (10): 1529–1540. doi:10.1021/acs.biochem.5b00946. PMID 26892689.
- Allu, Prasanna K. R.; Chirasani, Venkat R.; Ghosh, Dhiman; Mani, Anitha; Bera, Amal K.; Maji, Samir K.; Senapati, Sanjib; Mullasari, Ajit S.; Mahapatra, Nitish R. (14 February 2014). "Naturally Occurring Variants of the Dysglycemic Peptide Pancreastatin DIFFERENTIAL POTENCIES FOR MULTIPLE CELLULAR FUNCTIONS AND STRUCTURE-FUNCTION CORRELATION". Journal of Biological Chemistry. 289 (7): 4455–4469. doi:10.1074/jbc.M113.520916. PMC 3924307. PMID 24338022.

== See also ==
- HIV-1 protease
- Pancratistatin
