= Rajit Gadh =

Indian-American academic

- Education: IIT Kanpur, India; Cornell University; Carnegie Mellon University
- Known for: Electric Vehicle, Smart Grid and Wireless, and RFID technologies
- Awards: Fellow, American Society of Mechanical Engineers (ASME)
- Scientific career
- Fields: Mechanical and Aerospace Engineering
- Workplaces: University of California, Los Angeles

Rajit Gadh is a Professor of Mechanical and Aerospace Engineering at the UCLA Henry Samueli School of Engineering and Applied Science and the founding director of the UCLA Smart Grid Energy Research Center (SMERC), the UCLA Wireless Internet for Mobile Enterprise Consortium (WINMEC), and the Connected and Autonomous Electric Vehicles Consortium (CAEV).

== Personal and early life ==
A native of India, Gadh graduated from Loyola High School, Jamshedpur, and La Martiniere High School, Calcutta. He received his bachelor's degree in engineering at the Indian Institute of Technology Kanpur (IIT) and a M.S. degree in engineering at Cornell University. He went on to complete a Ph.D. in Engineering at Carnegie Mellon University (CMU), focusing on CAD/CAM, Feature Recognition, Computational Geometry, Artificial Intelligence/Robotics, and Visualization.

== Career ==
Gadh has over 25 years of experience in research and development, leading technology teams to investigate and develop advanced technologies and products. He is currently a professor at UCLA and the director of UCLA's Smart Grid Energy Research Center (SMERC), which focuses on researching and developing innovative technologies for the next generation electric utility grid.

Prior to UCLA, Gadh taught for seven years at the University of Wisconsin-Madison as an assistant, associate and full professor. He has also been a visiting researcher at Stanford University where he did his sabbatical from 1999 to 2000, and at the University of California, Berkeley where he served for a year after completing his doctorate degree.

Since 2004, Gadh has served on the editorial board of Computers in Entertainment. He is also on the editorial board for the International Journal of Internet Manufacturing and Services (IJIMS) and the advisory board for Los Angeles Cleantech Incubator.

== Awards and honors ==
Rajit Gadh received the Ralph R. Teetor Research and Educational Award from the Society of Automotive Engineers (SAE) in 1993, Eastman Kodak - ASME Best Technical Paper Award from ASME Design Automation Conference in 1993, ALCOA Science Support Scholar from ALCOA Foundation in 1993 & 1994, Research Initiation Award from the National Science Foundation (NSF) in 1994, Early CAREER Award from NSF in 1995, Research Initiation Award from the Engineering Foundation in 1994, Lucent Industrial Ecology Fellow from AT&T in 1996, Lucent Industrial Ecology Award from NSF in 1997, and the William Mong Visiting Research Fellowship in Engineering from the University of Hong Kong in 2008. In 2013, along with several UCLA SMERC team members, he also received the Best Paper (Bronze) award at the 2013 IEEE International Conference on RFID Technologies and Applications. He received from IEEE in 2021 an award for outstanding contributions to the IEEE's Power and Energy Society Chapter and the Southern California Community.

He is a fellow of the American Society of Mechanical Engineers (ASME).

== Media ==
In April 2024, Gadh was listed among the list of "Notable Indian Angelinos" by Medium.Com.

In September 2022, Gadh was interviewed by The Washington Post and Spectrum News 1 about the record breaking California heat wave and resulting record energy demand.

In April 2022, Diversity in Action Magazine published an article with an interview with Gadh about the Smart Grid of the future.

On February 17, 2021, Gadh was interviewed by CBS news about the overwhelmed power grid and deep freeze in Texas.

In July 2019, Rajit Gadh was interviewed on NBC talks and i24 News talks about the New York City power outage earlier that month on July 13, 2019. Gadh discussed the current best practices of avoiding power outages that can be applied on city-wide scales.

In January 2014, General Motors "Drive the District" ran an article on Dr. Gadh's ongoing research on the future of electric vehicle charging. In September, SMERC participated in the National Drive Electric Week 2014 event held at UCLA. Gadh was a guest speaker at the event.

Gadh was interviewed by World Politics Review and Southern California Public Radio about the massive blackouts in India on 30 and 31 of July 2012, the largest power outage in history, and was also interviewed by the BBC about the Great Blackout of 2011 that affected parts of Southern California and Arizona, the largest blackout in California history.

== Research and publications ==
He has over 200 published papers, given keynotes and lectures to numerous conferences, and has five patents granted.

== Books ==
Rajit Gadh (Ed.). (1993). Intelligent Concurrent Design: Fundamentals, Methodology, Modeling, and Practice. New York, NY: American Society of Mechanical Engineers

Rajit Gadh (Ed.). (1994). Concurrent Product Design. New York, NY: American Society of Mechanical Engineers

Osama M. Jadaan, Allan C. Ward, Edmund C. Feldy, Rajit Gadh, Nihon Kikai Gakkai (Eds.). (1995). 11th Biennial Conference on Reliability, Stress Analysis, and Failure Prevention. New York, NY: American Society of Mechanical Engineers

A.R. Thangaraj, Rajit Gadh, & S. Billatos (Eds.). (1995). Concurrent Product and Process Engineering. New York, NY: American Society of Mechanical Engineers

Dani, T., Gadh, R. (1998). Chapter 14: Virtual Reality - A New Technology for the Mechanical Engineer. In Kutz, M. (Ed.). Mechanical Engineering Handbook (2nd ed.). New York, NY: John Wiley & Sons.
