= Huntington Medical Research Institutes =

Medical research organization in California, US

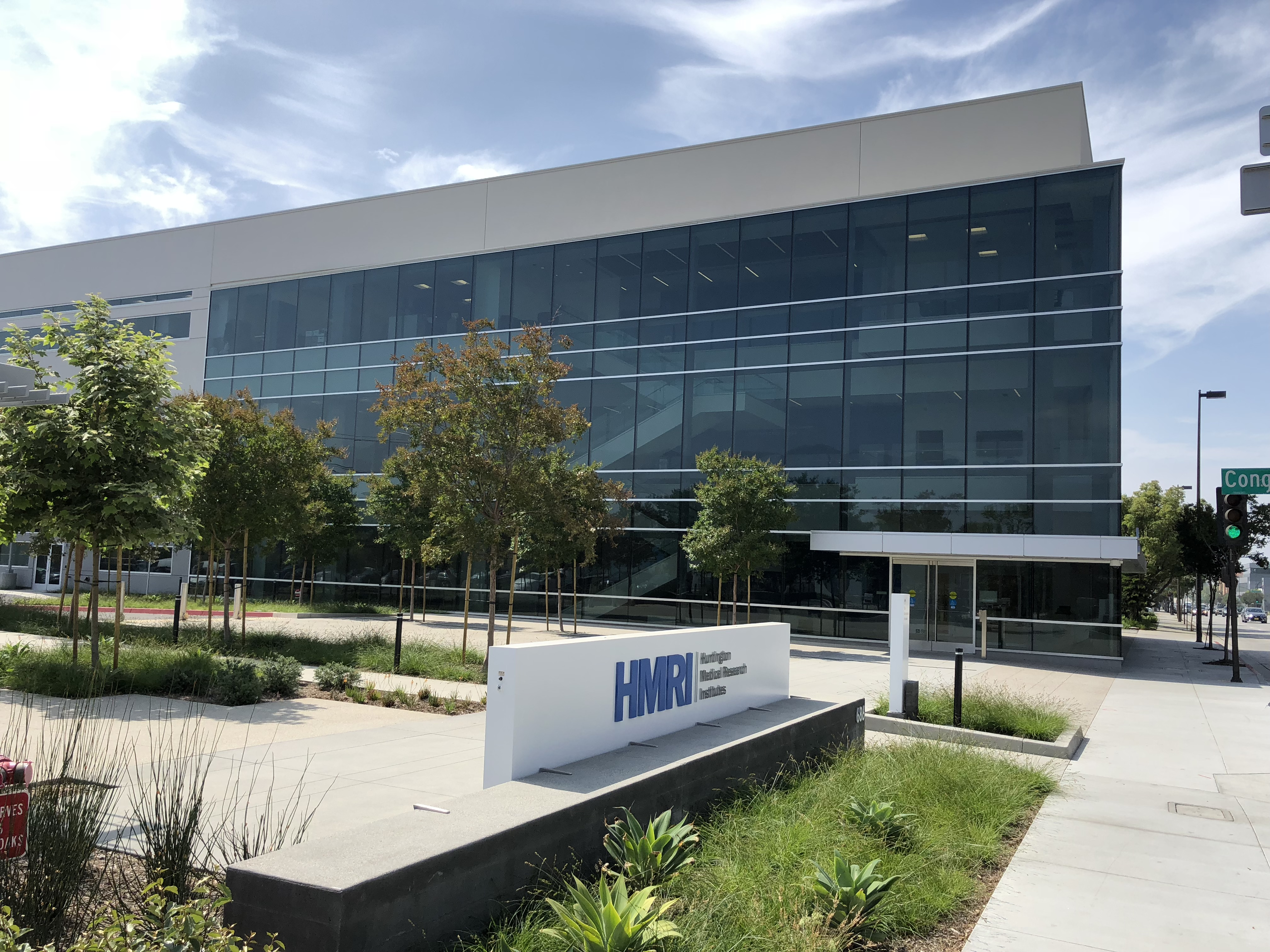
686 S. Fair Oaks, Pasadena, CA

Huntington Medical Research Institutes (HMRI) is an independent, nonprofit, applied medical research organization in Pasadena, California. The Institutes conduct laboratory and clinical work for the development of technology used in the diagnosis and treatment of disease. The Molecular Medicine programs, such as cancer genetics, molecular neurology, molecular pathology and tissue engineering, were conducted at the 99 North El Molino Avenue facility until April 2018. The Neural Engineering program is conducted at the 734 Fairmount Avenue building directly adjacent to Huntington Hospital. The Advanced Imaging Laboratory is located nearby at 10 Pico Street, as is the Liver Center at 660 South Fair Oaks Avenue. A new 35,000 square foot laboratory building for HMRI opened at 686 South Fair Oaks Avenue, Pasadena in April 2018. Programs in the new facility include neurolological and cardiovascular studies, as well as preeclampsia research.

== Cellular and molecular medicine ==
The original organization of HMRI was established in 1952. The El Molino Avenue laboratory began as the Pasadena Foundation for Medical Research, which placed emphasis on cancer research. Projects included pioneering work with the biomedical research application of laser energy, and in their cell culture laboratory they had developed a now widely used line of prostate cancer cells. Current work includes the study of protein abnormalities underlying susceptibility to migraine headaches, and the development of "histoid" tumor models.

== Neural engineering ==
The Fairmount laboratory was founded as the Institute of Medical Research of Huntington Memorial Hospital. It also housed the Pasadena Neurovascular Foundation. Past work included the proposal of improvements for automobile safety, the neurosurgical introduction of a silicone plastic material that made cerebrospinal fluid shunting practical for the treatment of hydrocephalus, advances in cardiovascular research, and the development of electronic neurological devices, including interface technology for vagus nerve stimulation. Current work in neuroprosthetics includes development of improved electrodes for deep brain stimulation for the treatment of movement disorders, such as Parkinson's disease, the treatment of profound deafness by direct stimulation of the brain, and new methods of electrical stimulation to control bladder evacuation in paralyzed patients.

== Imaging ==
The El Molino and Fairmount operations merged in 1982 as the Huntington Medical Research Institutes under the direction of Dr. William Opel, now president emeritus. At that time research at the Pico Street location added clinical studies of magnetic resonance imaging (MRI). Earlier advances at Pico Street included development of methods for providing CT-scanner guidance of 3-dimensional brain stereotactic surgery systems. Comparative studies of CT versus MRI contributed to the regulatory approval of magnetic resonance for medical imaging. Magnetoencephalography (MEG) research at Pico has improved the precision of brain mapping and subsequent surgery to remove parts of the brain responsible for some kinds of epilepsy. Research on in vivo magnetic resonance spectroscopy focuses on brain metabolism and on development of hyperpolarization agents to enhance signal output from tissue. New work includes anatomical, functional and biochemical studies of mild traumatic brain injury.

== Liver Center ==
The Liver Center conducts clinical trials of new drugs to treat hepatitis B and hepatitis C, and is developing new ways to conduct surveillance and do early intervention for post-hepatitis liver cancer.

== Fellowships and training ==
HMRI conducts a joint postdoctoral fellowship program in conjunction with the California Institute of Technology as well its own undergraduate student research program. HMRI has a 25-year history of conducting clinical training courses in magnetic resonance imaging and spectroscopy.
