= University Institute of Engineering and Technology, Panjab University =

Engineering college in India

Coordinates: 30.757895°N 76.768109°E

University Institute of Engineering and Technology, Chandigarh
- Type: Public
- Established: 2002; 24 years ago
- Accreditation: AICTE
- Academic affiliations: Panjab University
- Director: Dr. Sanjeev Puri
- Location: Chandigarh, India
- Website: www.uiet.puchd.ac.in

University Institute of Engineering and Technology (UIET) is the department of engineering and technology of Panjab University, Chandigarh which is recognized as Tier-1 institute by NIRF. It receives funds from the Central Government of India, offering undergraduate (BE), postgraduate (MTech degree) as well as doctoral courses.

== Campus ==
UIET is in the southern campus of Panjab University, Sector 25, Chandigarh. It has two academic blocks which include labs, offices, library, and lecture halls. There are blocks for mechanical labs and workshops. There is an ATM. Wi-Fi and Internet access is provided in some parts of the campus. Students are from all over the nation: few are day scholars and many live in hostels which provide accommodation, food, washrooms, and sporting facilities.

== Academics ==
UIET offers four-year Bachelor of Engineering (BE) and Master of Engineering (ME) courses are offered in various engineering fields, as well as full-time PhD courses.

*Receive NIRF Ranking under 100. 

Admissions to undergraduate courses are made through the JEE (Main) rank. Admissions to Master of Engineering courses are made through the Graduate Aptitude Test in Engineering (GATE) examinations. Admissions to PhD courses are made through the Graduate Aptitude Test in Engineering (GATE) examinations and University PhD Entrance Test.

== Student activities ==
=== Committees ===
The official student committees of the institute are known as the 'UTECHNOS' Committees. At present there are 10 such committees.

=== Entrepreneurship Development Cell ===
UIET has an Entrepreneurship Development Cell formed in 2011 to foster the growth of entrepreneurship and start-up environment in Panjab University's campus. UDYAMI is an annual national entrepreneurship summit organised by EDC, in which they host renowned CEOs, Investors and speakers.

=== Cultural and technical festivals ===
'Goonj' is the annual cultural festival, organised by the students of UIET. Events include quizzes, workshops, game shows, informal events, fashion show (Glitterati), dance show (Groovz), rock night, Pronite, and a city-level beauty pageant.

Conferences, events, competitions with workshops and lectures by eminent guests across the world are organised every year. Some of the conferences include National Conference on Computing, Communication and Control (3C-2009), National Conference on Advances in Mechanical Engineering (NCAME-2011), etc.

UIET has been hosting SAE EFFI-CYCLE, from the first season; it is now in its third season, with more than 120 teams competing including four IITs.

=== Technical societies ===
- IEEE-UIET, the Institute of Electrical and Electronics Engineers Student Chapter
- Design and Innovation Group, UIET – The DIG helps students of Chandigarh area to learn new and different technologies by organizing learn-ups, workshops, hackathons and many other tech events.
- SAE-UIET, the Society of Automotive Engineers Student Chapter, which encapsulates three main events related to mechanical engineering: BAJA, Student Formula One, and Aero-modelling.

== Alumni network ==
The Alumni Affairs Office at UIET was set up in March 2013 and is maintained by the Student Team for Alumni Relations (STAR) and a 10-member faculty team who supervise alumni events and activities. The office has played a substantial role in building relations with alumni and getting them back to the campus for growth and development of the college.

== MoUs ==
UIET has interactions and Memoranda of Understanding (MoUs) with industry and academia like Infosys (Campus Connect Program), IBM, IMTECH, and Bharti Group (Bharti Chair for research). The institute has a memorandum signed with the University of Western Australia.
