= Babi dynasty =

Indian dynasty (1654–1948)

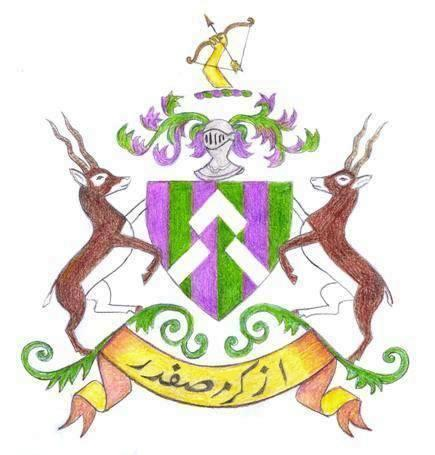
- Country: Junagadh State; Radhanpur State; Balasinor State; Bantva Manavadar; Sardargarh Bantva
- Founded: 1654
- Founder: Sher Khanji Babi
- Final ruler: Muhammad Mahabat Khan III (Junagadh); Mortaza Khan (Radhanpur); Muhammad Salabat Khan (Balasinor); Fatehuddin Khan (Manavadar); Hussainyawar Khanji (Sardargadh)
- Titles: Nawab of Junagadh; Nawab of Radhanpur; Nawab of Balasinor; Nawab of Bantva Manavadar; Nawab of Sardargarh Bantva

The Babi dynasty was a dynasty that formed the ruling royal houses of various kingdoms and later princely states of India in Gujarat.

The Babi, also known as Babai, was originally of Afghan descent, and traced its royal origins to the Mughal-era dynasty founded by Sher Khanji Babi in 1654, who was himself a ruler from the dynasty's founding until 1690.

== History ==
The Babi are as a tribe of Pashtuns that originated in the Kalat region of the Zabul Province in southeastern Afghanistan. They are considered to be the mythical sons of Ghorghasht or Gharghashti. (Note: Afghan patriarch of a confederation of various Pashtun clans that include the Babi/Babai) The first Babi, Usman Khan, is believed to have come to India from Khorasan with Humayun, the second Mughal emperor. Bahadur Khanji was conferred the hereditary title of Babi in 1554 by Humayun for "services against the Rana of Chittor".

Sher Khanji, the founder of the Babi dynasty in 1654 joined the service of Prince Murad Bakhsh in Kathiawar in Gujarat, the imperial viceroy and son of Shah Jahan. In Mughal sources, the members of the Babi tribe are recognized as "Gujaratis", due to their regional "Gujarati" identity, intermarriage and assimilation to its culture, and reference to their clan was mainly mentioned as a community within the different Gujarati subgroups, for example Shujaat Khan Gujarati of Ahmedabad. Aurangzeb also writes in the Ruqa'at-i Alamgiri: "The 'Faujdarship' should be given to one of the Gujaratis: Safdar Khan-i Sani", referring to Safdar Khan of the Babi tribe. They largely identified with those who had lived for generations in the country.

After the collapse of the Mughal Empire, the Babis were involved in a struggle with the Gaekwad dynasty of the Maratha Empire for control of Gujarat. While the Marathas were successful in establishing control over all of Gujarat, the Babi retained sovereignty of the princely states of Junagadh, Radhanpur, Balasinor, as well as the small states of Bantva Manavadar, Sardargarh.

The last Nawab of the princely state of Junagadh, Muhammad Mahabat Khan III, signed an Instrument of Accession and acceded his princely state of Junagadh, as well as its vassal state of Sardargadh, Bantva Manavadar, to the Dominion of Pakistan after the partition of India in 1947. However, the accession and annexation was not recognized by the Dominion of India and led to the Indian annexation of Junagadh and the Nawab migrated to Pakistan.

Today, members of the Babi tribe are found throughout north Gujarat and Saurashtra. Many of them are petty land owners, but there is marked urbanization among the Babi as well. Though the Babi observe a tradition of endogamy, there are cases of marriages with the Chauhan and Behlim communities, and they accept daughters from the Shaikhs and Sunni Bohras.

== Notable people ==
- Sher Khanji Babi, founder of the Babi dynasty in India
- Imamuddin Murtaza Khan Babi (1915–2008) or Ruswa Majhalumi, Gujarati poet from India
- Ghulam Moinuddin Khanji, Nawab of Bantva-Manavadar
- Parveen Babi (1954–2005), Indian film actress
- Muhammad Dilawar Khanji, 14th Governor of Sindh, Pakistan

== See also ==
- Pathans in India
- Pathans of Gujarat
- List of Sunni dynasties
- List of Pashtun empires and dynasties
