= Khanji =

Khanji is an occupational surname literally meaning "innkeeper" ("khan keeper"; -ji is an occupational suffix). Notable people with the surname include:

- Antoine Khanji (born 1960), Canadian artist
- Muhammad Dilawar Khanji (1918-1989), Pakistani politician
- Ghulam Moinuddin Khanji (1911-2003), ruler of Manavadar State
- One of many Nawabs of Junagarh
  - Sher Khanji Babi
- One of many rulers of Balasinor State
- Ahmad Mayez Khanji (born 1967), Syrian boxer
