= Saurashtra (state) =

Former State of the India Union

Coordinates: 21.5°N 70.13°E

United State of Kathiawar (15 February 1948 – 1 November 1948) United State of Saurashtra (1948–1956)
- Former State of India
- 1948–1956
- Saurashtra State in India, 1951
- Capital: Rajkot
- History
  - Abolition of the Baroda, Western India and Gujarat States Agency: 15 February 1948
  - Merger into Bombay State: 1 November 1956
Preceded by	Succeeded by
Baroda, Western India and Gujarat States Agency	Bombay State

Saurashtra State, formally known as the United State of Kathiawar and later the United State of Saurashtra, was a state of India that existed between 1948 and 1956. It was located on the peninsula of Kathiawar, and Rajkot was its capital.

== History ==
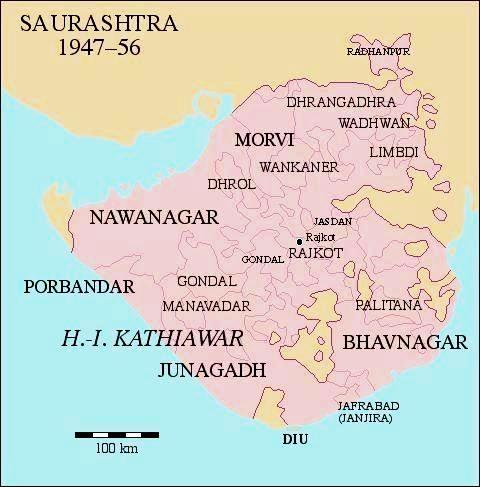
United Saurashtra (Kathiawar) State, 1948-56

=== Formation as United State of Kathiawar ===
Saurashtra state was originally named the United State of Kathiawar. It was formed on 15 February 1948, from approximately 200 large and small princely states of the colonial Baroda, Western India and Gujarat States Agency of the British Raj territory under direct colonial rule.

The name of State was given after the Kathiawar and Saurashtra region, both of which generally denote the same geographical region of lands on the main peninsula of Gujarat. The persuasions of Sardar Vallabhbhai Patel and the influence of Mahatma Gandhi are credited for persuading most of the States of Kathiawar to join the Union of India and sign the Instrument of Accession. Patel met and managed to convince the local princes and petty subas, totaling 222 in Saurashtra region alone. Among these in Kathiawar Agency were 14 Salute states, 17 minor and 191 petty non-salute princely states and 46 Estates (Jagir-level). Most of the native rulers of the Kathiawar States entered into a Covenant for the formation of the United State of Kathiawar on 24 January 1948.

The large Kathiawar peninsula included some prominent princely states of India, notably salute state:

- the vast Baroda State, title Maharaja Gaekwar, hereditary salute of 21 guns (highest native rank in colonial India)
- Idar, title Maharaja, hereditary salute of 15 guns
- Bhavnagar State, title Maharaja, hereditary salute of 13 guns (15 guns local)
- Navanagar, title Maharaja Jam Sahib, hereditary salute of 13 guns (15 guns local)
- Dhrangadhra(-Halvad), title Maharaja Raj Sahib, hereditary salute of 13 guns (local 15 gun).
- Porbandar, title Maharaja Rana Sahib, Hereditary salute of 13-guns
- Rajpipla State, title Rajpipla, Hereditary salute of 13-guns
- Cambay, title Nawab, Hereditary salute of 11-guns
- Gondal, title Maharaja, Hereditary salute of 11-guns
- Morvi, title Maharan, Hereditary salute of 11-guns
- Wankaner, title Maharana Raj Sahib, Hereditary salute of 11-guns
- Baria, title Maharaol, Hereditary salute of 9-guns (11-guns personal)
- Dharampur, title Raja, Hereditary salute of 9-guns (11-guns personal)
- Dhrol, title Thakore Sahib, Hereditary salute of 9-guns
- Limbdi, title Thakore Sahib, Hereditary salute of 9-guns
- Palitana, title Thakore Sahib, Hereditary salute of 9-guns
- Rajkot, title Thakore Sahib, Hereditary salute of 9-guns
- Sachin, title Nawab, Hereditary salute of 9-guns
- Wadhwan, title Maharana, Hereditary salute of 9-guns

and many smaller non-salute-states, including petty (e)states, often not more than one or two villages, making the peninsula the most fragmented of feudal age India.

Among the States of Kathiawar, Baroda State -which was the third largest Princely state of India, having its territories scattered over Dwarka in West of Kathiawar to Bombay in South- did not sign the covenant for the formation of the United State of Kathiawar. Instead the erstwhile Gaekwar Maharaja of Baroda, Pratap Singh Gaekwad declared a full responsible Government on 4 September 1948, under Jivraj Narayan Mehta, as Prime Minister of the State, as per scheme envisioned by Sardar Patel. The Baroda State later merged itself into Bombay State on 1 May 1949.

Sardar Vallabhbhai Patel inaugurated the United State of Kathiawar on 15 February 1948. On this occasion he paid tribute to Jam Sahib and the other rulers of erstwhile Princely States of Kathiawar, saying:

But for vision, wisdom and patriotism, the happy result you are seeing today would not have fructified. It was Mahatma Gandhi's dream that Kathiawar should be united and it gladdens my heart that dream of such unification has come true.

The Jam Sahib K. S. Digvijaysinhji of Nawanagar State one of the chief negotiator from the side of rulers of Kathiawar in his reply observed and said:

It is not as if we were tired monarchs who were fanned to rest. It is not as we have been bullied into submission. We have by our own free volition pooled our sovereignties and covenanted to create this new State so that the United State of Kathiawar and unity of India may more fully be achieved

Jawaharlal Nehru described the event as a great step forward and one of the most notable in contemporary Indian history. He further commended the statesmanship of Sardar Patel and further wrote in his letter to provincial chief ministers on 20 February 1948:

Six months ago it would have been considered an idle dream to think of an administrative merger of hundreds of Kathiawar states, let alone such a merger accompanied by a full responsible government. The peninsula was ridden by factions and jealousies and it was crazy patchwork of States of varying degree of sovereignty, with only one thing in common, namely, autocratic rule. On February 15 the whole of peninsula became one unit under one Government. For which, Sardar Patel has won tribute.

Upon formation of United State of Kathiawar, Lord Mountbatten also congratulated Sardar Patel, saying:

It appears that you have again scored a brilliant success in your handling of Kathiawar States problem.

However, it was sad that Mahatma Gandhi was not alive by that time to see his dream of whole of Kathiawar getting united under one umbrella.

Even after creation of United State of Kathiawar, there were some patches of lands in Kathiawar belonging to princely states of Junagadh, Mangrol, Manavadar and others, which did not join the convention and were wishing to join Pakistan. It was later after violent integration of Junagadh into Union of India that a referendum was held and Junagadh, Mangrol, Manavadar, Babariawad (Rajula) and others became a legal part of India. However, due to some technicalities, these territories even after the referendum remained under an Executive Council of popular representatives of Junagadh led by Samaldas Gandhi, for some time, who assisted the administrator appointed by Government of India in managing affairs of these states.

=== Renamed Saurashtra ===
In November 1948, the United State of Kathiawar was renamed the United State of Saurashtra or Saurashtra State, when a supplementary covenant was negotiated and executed by the native rulers of the princely states merged into United State of Kathiawar.

Once the Saurashtra Union came into existence, a second supplementary covenant was executed in January 1949, providing the integration of Junagadh with Saurashtra. A few days later on 20 February 1949, the administration of Junagadh State (another major salute state) and also that of Mangrol, Manavadar, Babariawad(rajula), Bantva and Sardargarh were officially handed over to Saurashtra Government.

=== Dissolution ===
On 1 November 1956 Saurashtra State ceased to exist as a state and became a part of Bombay State, the territory of which was enlarged on that day to include Kutch State, Saurashtra State, Marathwada & Vidarbha, while a southern portion was excluded, which went to Karnataka.

Following Mahagujarat Movement, the Bombay State was again dissolved to be carved into two separate states of Maharashtra and Gujarat created on linguistic basis on 1 May 1960 With this, the area of Saurashtra State again became a geographically defined region, Saurashtra, within the State of Gujarat.

== Chief officers ==
=== Monarchs ===
The following princes of salute states served as Rajpramukh (premier Prince), i.e. Head of the State :

- Krishnakumarsinhji Bhavsinhji (b. 1912 - d. 1965), the last ruler of Bhavnagar State, was acting Rajpramukh.
- Digvijaysinhji Ranjitsinhji, last ruler of Nawanagar, was Rajpramukh from 1948 until 31 October 1956
  - Mayurdwajsinhji Meghrajji III, the last ruler of Dhrangadhra State, was appointed as Upa-Rajpramukh alias Deputy Rajapramukh, to serve as acting Rajpramukh during the absence of Rajpramukh. He worked as Uprajpramukh from 1948 till 1956.

=== Prime Ministers ===
- Uchharangray Navalshankar Dhebar (b. 1905 - d. 1977) acted as Prime Minister of State from 15 February 1948 till 26 January 1950.

=== Chief Ministers ===
- Uchharangray Navalshankar Dhebar (b. 1905 - d. 1977) acted as Chief Minister of State from 26 January 1950 till 19 December 1954.
- Rasiklal Umedchand Parikh (b. 1910 - d. 1982) was second and last Chief Minister of State from 19 December 1954 till 31 October 1956 .

== See also ==
- 1952 Saurashtra Legislative Assembly election
- Baroda, Western India and Gujarat States Agency
- Political integration of India
