= Pathans of Sindh =

Ethnic communities in Sindh

Regions with significant populations
- Shikarpur • Larkana • Kandhkot • Sukkur • Dadu • Karachi • Ghotki

Languages
- Sindhi • Urdu • Pashto

Religion
- Islam

Related ethnic groups
- Pashtuns • Pathans of Punjab • Rohilla • Pathans of Gujarat • Pathans of Rajasthan • Pathans of Uttar Pradesh • Pathans of Bihar • Pathans of India

Pathans of Sindh (Sindhi: پٺاڻ) or the Sindhi Pathans are communities of Pashtun descent settled in Sindh and can be referring to Sindhified Pashtun communities. They are living in Sindh for centuries and have adopted the norms and culture of Sindh.

Many bear the tribes Tareen, Naghar, Agha, and Kakar. The vast majority of Sindhi Pathans originate from Quetta and southern Afghanistan, and a few come from Khyber Pakhtunkhwa. Shikarpur, New Zarkhail, Pir Bux Khan Wandh, Garhi Yasin, and Sultan Kot Shahpur Chakar, whereas others live in other urban, sub-urban, and rural areas of Sindh. The tribes most commonly found in the Sindh region are the Tareen, Muhammadzai, Niazi, Kundi, Miana, Bangash, Yusufzai, Hassan Zai, Mandanr, Lodi, Kakar, Shinwari, Sherwani Orakzai, Sulemankhel Sulemani, Afridi, Khattak, Kakazai, Karlani, Barakzai, Khizerzai, Babar, and the Zamand Pathans.

Moreover, a large minority of Pashto-speaking Pashtuns exist in the city of Karachi and, to a lesser extent, in other parts of Sindh, who have migrated after around the 60's and 70's and even a portion of these Pashtuns are Afghan refugees. Pashto-speaking Pashtuns are highly distinct from ancestrally Pashtun Urdu-speaking Muhajirs as well as ancestrally Pashtun Sindhi-speakers.

== Notable people ==
- Agha Siraj Durrani, Speaker of the Provincial Assembly of Sindh
- Nuzhat Pathan, Member of the National Assembly of Pakistan
- Agha Shahbaz Khan Durrani, Member of the Provincial Assembly Sindh

== See also ==
- Agha Javed Pathan
- Agha Siraj Durrani
