= Babi (title) =

Babi is a Title conferred upon to the descendants of the Babai Tribe by the Mughal Emperors as Babi. The Babai tribe formed many ruling princely states in the Mughal era, hence forming Babi dynasty.

Due to linguistic differences, Babai (Pashto) was called Babi by the Mughal Emperors.

Babi or Babai is a Pashtun Tribe. Babai is son of Ghorghasht or Gharghasht who is son of Qais Abdul Rasheed.

Bahadur Khanji Babai, son of Usman Khan Babai, who with his Babai tribesmen went to India to join the forces of Mughals on the request of Mughal Emperor Humayun to defeat the rivals.

They entered the Mughal service and received the title of Babi in 1554 from Emperor Humayun on showing exemplary courage & valour, for services against the Rana of Chittor'.

Later Babai enjoyed royal status & maintained their legacy by forming princely ruling states in the British era.

- Khan Sahib Shri Babi: the title of the ruler of the Indian princely state of Bantva-Manavadar state (founded in 1760) which in September 1947 acceded to Pakistan, but on 15 February 1948 rescinded accession to Pakistan, to accede to India; the dynasty is called Babi.
- Nawab Babi: the title of the ruler of the Indian princely state of Sardargadh, Balasinor; the dynasty is called Babi Dynasty
- Babi was also the name of the only ruling dynasty (title Nawab) in the salute state of Radhanpur, where for generations Bahadur Babi followed the ruler's personal name
- The same dynasty finally ruled Junagadh state

== See also ==
- Pathans of Gujarat

== Sources and references ==
- Indian princely states- see each state quoted
