= Pathans of Punjab =

Pashtun heritage people of Punjab

Pashtuns of Punjab
Total population
- 2,387,378 (2023 Pakistani census) [only includes those who speak Pashto as their mother tongue]

Regions with significant populations
- Pakistan (West Punjab); India (East Punjab; specifically Malerkotla, historically also Ludhiana and Jullundhur)

Languages
- Punjabi • Hindko • Pashto • Saraiki • Urdu

Religion
- Islam

Related ethnic groups
- Pathans • Pathans of Sindh • Rohilla • Pathans of Gujarat • Pathans of Rajasthan • Pathans of Uttar Pradesh • Pathans of Bihar

The Pashtuns of Punjab (Punjabi, Urdu: پنجابی پٹھان; Pashto: د پنجاب پښتانه), also called Punjabi Pathans or Pathans, are descendants of Pashtun settlers, an eastern Iranian ethnic group, in the Punjab region of Pakistan and India. They were originally from the Pashtunistan region of Afghanistan and Pakistan bordering the Punjab region. Most of these Pashtun communities are scattered throughout the Punjab and have over time assimilated and integrated into the Punjabi society and culture.

These non-frontier Pathans are usually known by the town or locality in which they are settled, e.g. Lahori Pathans.

== History and origin ==
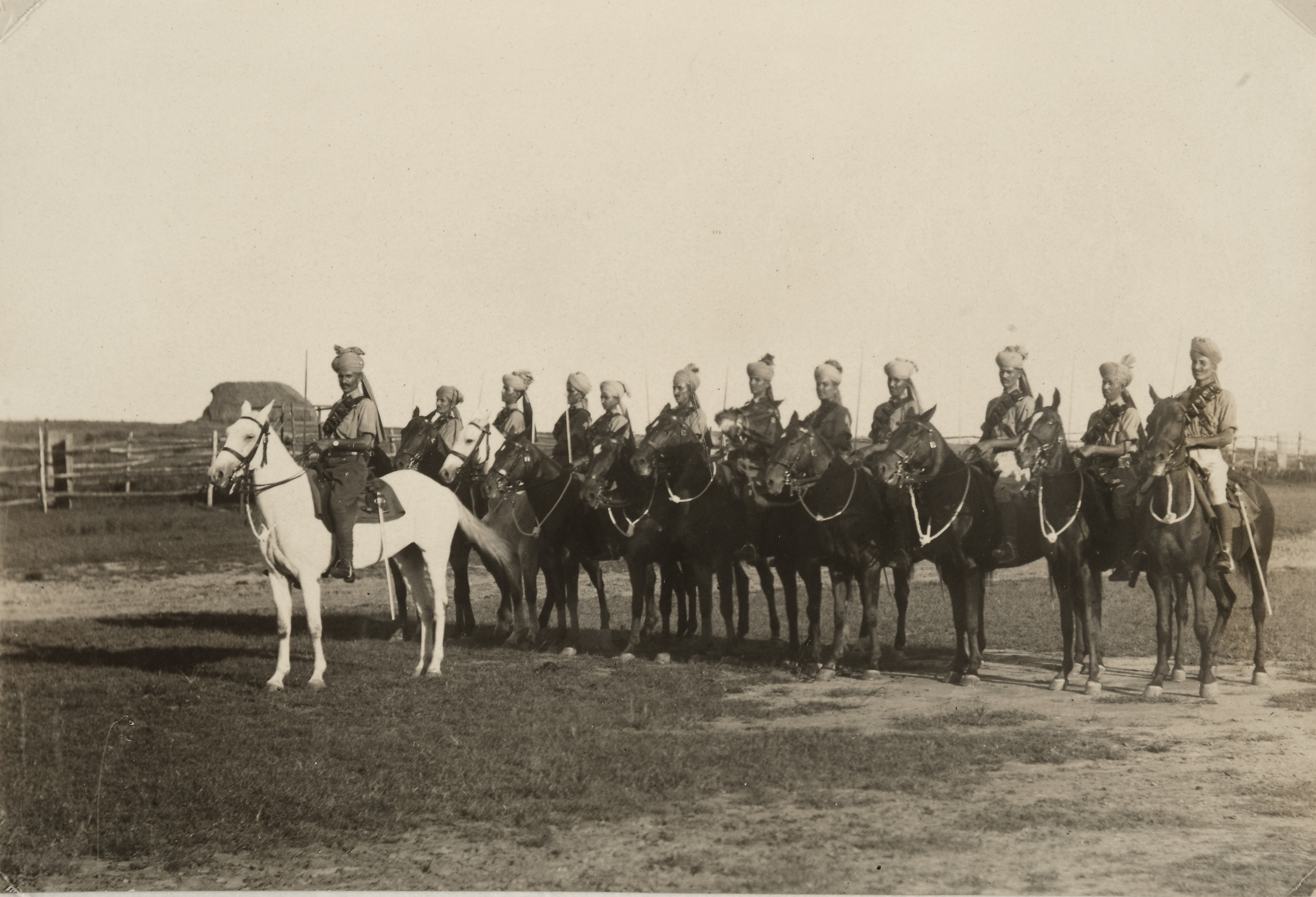
Pathan recruits in the First World War as part of British Indian Army

Colonies of Pathans (Pashtun people) arriving in Punjab are accounted for by Sir Densil Ibbetson in the following manner:

During the Khilji, Lodi and Surid dynasties many Pathans migrated to Punjab especially during the reign of Jalal-ud-din Khalji, Bahlul Lodi and Sher Shah Suri.

— Sir Denzil Ibbetson

The Pathans are speculated by some to be descendants of the soldiers of Alexander the Great who invaded the area in 327–323 BC. Archaeological evidence, however, suggests a Greek influence before this invasion. A phylogenetic study investigated the possible genetic relation of Pathans with Greeks and found evidence of a limited contributions of Greek genes in the Pathan population.

== Main divisions ==
=== Malerkotla Pathans ===
In the Indian Punjabi city of Malerkotla, sixty-five percent of the total population is Muslim and out of this population, twenty percent are Punjabi Pathans.

These Pathans trace their ancestry to Shaikh Sadruddin-i-Jahān, a pious man of the Sherwani of the Darband (Note: Darban Kalan and Frontier Region of Drazinda in FR Dera Ismail Khan, NWFP) area of what is now the North-West Frontier Province of Pakistan. Bahlul Lodi (1451–1517), the Afghan king who had most of the western parts of India under his control, desired to rule Delhi and on his way, he was caught in a sand drift. While there was nothing visible in the darkness, the King spotted a dim light of a lamp still burning in the wind. It was the hut of Shaikh Sadruddin and when the king found out, he came to the hut to show his respect and asked the holy man to pray for him to bear a son and have victory. During 1451 and 1452, the king married off his daughter Taj Murassa to Shaikh Sadruddin after being enthroned in Delhi, and also gave him the area of Malerkotla. The descendants of Shaikh Sadruddin branched into two groups. One started ruling the state and were given the title of Nawab. The other branch lived around the Shrine of Shaikh Sadruddin, controlling its revenue.

One notable thing about the Punjabi Pathans of Malerkotla is the fact the women strictly observe pardah, albeit they are no longer required to wear the burqa. In regards to language, Pashto was their primary language until 1903. Afterwards, the Malerkotla Pathans began to speak Punjabi and Hindustani. In the city, there are twenty-nine shrines to saints from Afghanistan, whom the Malerkotla Pathans revere. Although the level of education is low among the community, many of these Pathans serve in the civil service, particularly in the Indian Police Service. Others maintain businesses, rent property, and rear horses. Because the level of religiosity amongst Malerkotla Pathans is high, many families sent their children to madrasahs where Qur'anic education is compulsory. For higher education, many children study in schools in Patiala or Ludhiana.

=== Multani Pathans ===
The descendants of Zamand very early migrated in large numbers to Multan, to which province they furnished rulers, till the reign of the Mughal Emperor Aurangzeb, when a number of the Abdali tribe under the leadership of Shah Husain were driven from Kandahar by tribal feuds, took refuge in Multan, and being early supplemented by other of their kinsmen who were expelled by Mir Wais, the great Ghilzai chief, conquered Multan and founded the tribe well known in the Punjab as Multani Pathans.

Their main clans were the Alizai, Badozai, Bamzai and Saddozai, all clans of the Durrani tribe. Other tribal communities include the Safi (Pashtun tribe), Babar, Khakwani, Tareen. In Muzaffargarh District, the Pathans of the district are related to the Multani Pathans. They settled in Muzaffargarh in the 18th century, as small groups of Multani Pathan expended their control from the city of Multan. There distribution is as follows; the Alizai Durrani are found at Lalpur, and the Popalzai are found in Docharkha, while the Babars are based in Khangarh and Tareen in Kuhawar are other important tribes.

== Demographics ==
=== Pakistan's Punjab ===
In Pakistan's Punjab province, at the time of the 2023 census, 2,3 million individuals spoke Pashto as their mother tongue, but many if not most of the Pashtuns who have settled in Punjab over the centuries don't speak Pashto anymore so aren't counted in such census.

== Notable Pathans of Punjab ==
- Imran Khan, 22nd Prime Minister of Pakistan
- Ashfaq Ahmed, Pakistani writer, broadcaster and intellectual
- Yahya Khan, Third President of Pakistan
- Amir Abdullah Khan Niazi, Pakistani army officer and last Governor of East Pakistan
- Justice Munir, 2nd Chief Justice of Pakistan
- Jehangir Khan, Pakistani businessman, politician and former minister for Industries
- Dr. Nazir Ahmed, Pakistani scientist, bureaucrat and founding chairman of the Pakistan Atomic Energy Commission
- Shaukat Tarin, Pakistani politician and former finance minister of Pakistan
- Ishaq Khan Khakwani, Pakistani politician and former minister of State for Railways, IT & Telecom
- Maulana Kausar Niazi, Pakistani politician, religious leader and former federal minister
- Abdul Sattar Khan Niazi, Pakistan movement activist and religious leader
- Humair Hayat Khan Rokhri, Pakistani politician and member of the National Assembly of Pakistan
- Tariq Masood Niazi, Pakistani field hockey player
- Munir Niazi, Pakistani poet of Urdu and Punjabi languages
- Sardar Mohammad Khan, Linguistic researcher of Arabic, English, Urdu and Persian
- Karamat Rahman Niazi, former Chief of Naval Staff of Pakistan
- Shuja Khanzada, Pakistan Army officer who fought in the War of '71 and Siachen, martyred in a suicide blast at Attock
- Misbah-ul-Haq, Pakistani cricketer

== See also ==
- Pashtun diaspora
- Rohilla
- Pathans of Bihar
- Pathans of Kashmir
- Pathans of Gujarat
- Pathans of Sindh
- Pathans of Uttar Pradesh
- Muhajir people
- Kashmiris in Punjab
- Baloch people in Punjab
