= Indian annexation of Junagadh =

1947–48 annexation by India

Integration of Junagadh into the Union of India
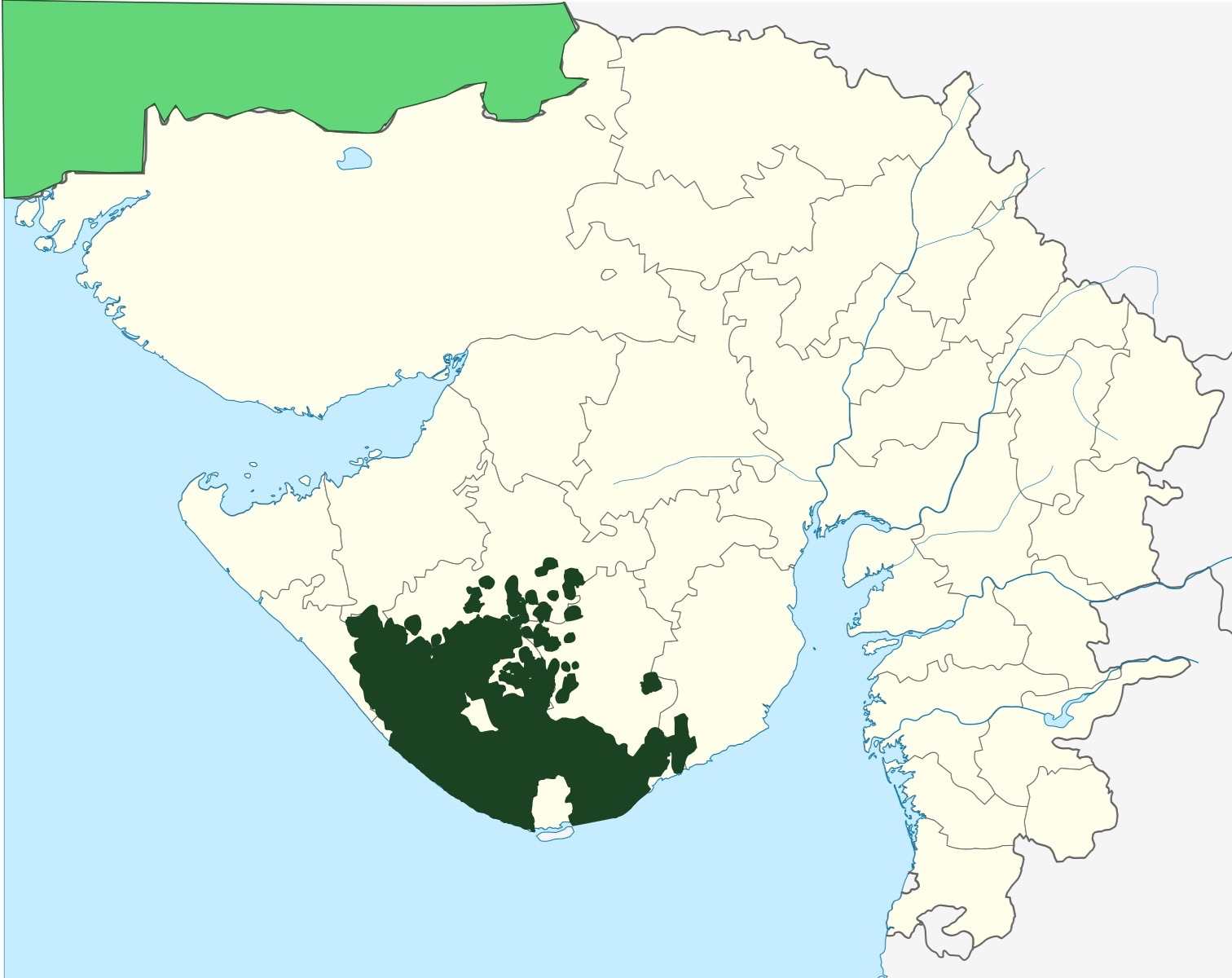
Date	November 1947 – February 1948
Location	Junagadh State
Result	Indian victory
Territorial changes	State of Junagadh integrated by India and incorporated into Saurashtra state.

Belligerents
Dominion of India	State of Junagadh

Commanders and leaders
(Dominion of India) Jawaharlal Nehru; (Dominion of India) Sardar Vallabhbhai Patel	(Junagadh) Muhammad Mahabat Khanji III

Between November 1947 and February 1948, the princely state of Junagadh was underby the Union of India, following the state's accession to Pakistan (the entire population of Junagadh didn't support this)internal revolt and a blockade by the neighbouring princely states. Junagadh had been a princely state under the suzerainty of the British Crown, until independence and partition of India in 1947.

It had the choice of joining one of the two newly independent dominions: the Union of India or Pakistan. It was ruled by Nawab Muhammad Mahabat Khanji III, a Muslim whose ancestors had ruled Junagadh and small principalities for some two hundred years.

The Nawab decided that Junagadh should become part of Pakistan, much to the displeasure of many of the people of the state, an overwhelming majority of whom were Hindus, about 80%. On 15 August 1947, the Nawab announced his intention to accede to Pakistan, with which it had no land border and which it could access only by sea. The principality of Babariawad and Sheikh of Mangrol reacted by claiming independence from Junagadh and accession to India, although the Sheikh of Mangrol withdrew his accession to India the next day. Muhammad Ali Jinnah waited for a month to accept the Instrument of Accession. When Pakistan accepted the Nawab's Instrument of Accession on 13 September, the Government of India objected. Nehru laid out India's position which was that India did not accept Junagadh's accession to Pakistan. Home Minister Sardar Vallabhbhai Patel believed that if Junagadh was permitted to go to Pakistan, it would exacerbate the communal tension already simmering in Gujarat.

The princely state was surrounded on all of its land borders by India, with an outlet onto the Arabian Sea. The unsettled conditions in Junagadh had led to a cessation of all trade with India and the food position became precarious. With the region in crisis, the Nawab, fearing for his life, fled to Karachi with his family and followers.

Sardar Vallabhbhai Patel offered Pakistan time to reverse its acceptance of the accession and to hold a plebiscite in Junagadh. Meanwhile, tensions were simmering in the regional areas and in major cities such as Bombay against the Nawab's decision. 25,000 - 30,000 people belonging to Saurashtra and Junagadh gathered in Bombay, proclaiming to liberate Junagadh from the Nawab's regime. Samaldas Gandhi formed a provisional government-in-exile, called the Aarzi Hukumat (lit. Provisional Government) of the people of Junagadh. Eventually, Patel ordered the integration of Junagadh's three subsidiary principalities. Junagadh's state government, facing financial collapse and lacking forces with which to resist Indian force, invited the Government of India to take control. A plebiscite was conducted in December, in which approximately 99.95% of the people chose India over Pakistan.

A number of scholars have opined that India "annexed" Junagadh through force however the scholars missed that an overwhelming majority of Junagadh supported the Accession to Union of India.

== Background ==
After the announcement by the last Viceroy of India, Lord Mountbatten, on 3 June 1947, of the intention to partition India, the British parliament passed the Indian Independence Act 1947 on 18 July 1947. As a result, the native states were left with these choices: to accede to either of the two new dominions, India or Pakistan or to remain an independent state.

The constitutional adviser to the Nawab of Junagadh, Nabi Baksh, and Junagadh's ministers gave the impression to Mountbatten that Junagadh intended to accede to India. However, Muslim League politicians from Sindh had joined Junagadh's executive council since May, and the state's diwan was away for health reasons, leaving the charge with Shah Nawaz Bhutto. (Note: Shahnawaz Bhutto was a politician from Sindh, and the father of the later Pakistan prime minister Zulfikar Ali Bhutto.) Bhutto met Jinnah in July, who advised him to hold out till 15 August under any circumstances. Accordingly, the state continued to give the impression till the last moment that it was intending to join India along with other Kathiawar states. Four days before independence, under the influence of the Muslim League politicians, the Nawab decided to join Pakistan, and sent a delegation to Karachi to negotiate terms with Pakistan, disregarding Mountbatten's contiguity principle. Mountbatten's contention was that only states bordering Pakistan should accede to it. Evidently, it was not a constitutional requirement, only a political one. The Nawab and Pakistan reasoned that Junagadh was close enough to Pakistan and linked by a sea route (Veraval to Karachi).

Junagadh, under the amendments done to the Government of India Act 1935, had political bonds with the neighbouring states of Mangrol and Babariawad. In 1943, The latter states were tied to Junagadh through an attachment scheme, but when the act was adopted in 1947, the amendments had not carried over, and this lapse was the base on which VP Menon argued that Junagadh did not have a say in the affairs of Mangrol and Babariawad states. Nehru strategised that if Junagadh didn't recognise the accession of Mangrol and Babariawad and withdraw its forces from the latter, then he would send in forces, information of which he sent to Pakistan and Britain. Meanwhile, a study case of India regarding Junagadh was made in the international opinion through press communiques that provided information on Junagadh's geographical contiguity to Indian landscape and its demographics.

== Instrument of accession ==
Copy of the Instrument of Accession of Junagadh (first page) presented to the Constituent Assembly of Pakistan

Mountbatten and Ayyangar both agreed that the issue of geographical contiguity had no legal standing and that Junagadh's accession to Pakistan was strictly and legally correct. But Sardar Patel demanded that the matter of the state's accession should be decided by its people instead of the ruler. Nehru laid out India's position which was that India did not accept Junagadh's accession to Pakistan.

Later at the United Nations Security Council, India's argument revolved around the wishes of the people which it accused the Nawab of ignoring. India's representative at the UNSC was also advised to avoid legalistic arguments about the Instrument of Accession because of the effect it could have on Jammu & Kashmir.

== Provisional government (Aarzi Hukumat) ==
Upon Menon's advice Mahatma Gandhi's nephew, Samaldas Gandhi, created a provisional government in Bombay with the provincial government's backing. This government received support from the 'Gujarat States Organisation' and also received sponsorship from the Kathiawar States' Political Conference. (Note: The Kathiawar Political Conference (Kathiawar Rajkiya Parishad) was established in 1921 to coordinate the peoples' movements in the princely states of Kathiawar. Its goal was to achieve some participation of the states' subjects in the governance of the states. It became a member of the All India States Peoples' Conference when the latter was founded in 1927, and remained so until its dissolution in April 1948, after which it merged with the Indian National Congress.)

Samaldas Gandhi, U. N. Dhebar and members of Junagadh People's Conference met at the office of Gujarati daily Vande Mataram in Bombay on 19 August 1947. He was specially invited to attend Kathiawar Political Conference on 25 August 1947. A five-member committee called Junagadh Committee was formed on 15 September 1947. Gandhi met V. P. Menon and proposed to form a government-in-exile the Aarzi Hakumat or Provisional Government of Junagadh State. On 25 September 1947, the Aarzi Hukumat headed by Samaldas Gandhi was declared in a public meeting at Madhavbagh in Bombay.

The five member ministry of Aarzi Hakumat went to Rajkot. Gandhi became the Prime Minister and also held ministry of foreign affairs. Other prominent leaders included Durlabhji Khetani as Deputy Prime Minister and Finance Minister, Narendra Nathwani Law and Order, Bhavanishankar Oza Home Minister, Manilal Doshi Home Minister, Suragbhai Varu Defence Minister, Ratubhai Adani Commander-in-Chief. Aarzi Hakumat captured 160 villages in forty days, from 30 September to 8 November 1947.

India allowed the provisional government to take control over outlying areas of Junagadh. India later at the UN Security Council denied ever having supported the provisional government. Pakistan objected to India's indifference to the actions of Junagadh's provisional government. Nehru wrote to Pakistan that the provisional government was "a spontaneous expression of popular resentment" to the state's accession to Pakistan by Junagadh's local population.

== "Blockade" and integration into Indian Union ==
To force the Nawab of Junagadh to change his decision, the Provisional Government (Aarzi Hukumat) and the volunteer forces in the surrounding regions of Kathiawar implemented a blockade. India later denied ever having blocked Junagadh's supplies. The blockade compelled the state's ruler to leave for Pakistan, who left the state's administration to his Prime Minister (Dewan) Sir Shahnawaz Bhutto. Menon claimed that the Nawab had delegated the state's destiny to Bhutto, which is not implausible since it was primarily Shah Nawaz Bhutto who had taken the decision to accede to Pakistan, under the close influence and mentorship of Jinnah. Bhutto requested the regional commissioner for administrative assistance "pending an honourable settlement of the several issues involved in Junagadh's accession." Diwan Bhutto waited till November for Pakistan to send help, but none came. The provisional government, nationalistic volunteers from the Indian side, and the Hindu residents had started to agitate and tensions were simmering. Meanwhile, the state of Junagadh had raised a force of 670 Muslim men, who had been stationed at various places to ensure retaliation, if any. Fearing an outbreak of communal violence, on 9 November 1947, the Indian Government assumed the state's administration to re-establish peace. Nawab's soldiers were disarmed, with Diwan Bhutto leaving for Pakistan a day before.

Nehru telegrammed Liaquat Ali Khan:

In view of special circumstances pointed out by Junagadh Dewan that is the Prime Minister of Junagadh – our Regional Commissioner at Rajkot has taken temporary charge of Junagadh administration. This has been done to avoid disorder and resulting chaos. We have, however, no desire to continue this arrangement and wish to find a speedy solution in accordance with the wishes of the people of Junagadh. We have pointed out to you previously that final decision should be made by means of referendum or plebiscite. We would be glad to discuss this question and allied matters affecting Junagadh with representatives of your Government at the earliest possible moment convenient to you. We propose to invite Nawab of Junagadh to send his representatives to this conference.

Liaquat Ali Khan replied:

Your telegram informing that your Government had taken charge of Junagadh was received by me on November 10, 1947. Your action in taking over State Administration and sending Indian troops to state without any authority from Pakistan Government and indeed without our knowledge, is a clear violation of Pakistan territory and breach of International law.

Alleged Reports arrived of widespread murder, rape and looting of Muslims in Junagarh following the arrival of Indian troops. Many Muslims from Junagarh began migrating to Pakistan.

After India assumed administration in Junagadh, India's Ministry of Law stated that the "accession" of Junagadh to Pakistan had not been invalidated by plebiscite and that Junagadh had not yet acceded to India. But India went ahead with the referendum because it believed the result would be in its favour.

== Plebiscite ==
On 24 September, legal adviser Walter Monckton told Mountbatten that Pakistan's consent would be needed for any plebiscite India wished to conduct in Junagadh because of the Nawab's accession to Pakistan.

Nehru had shifted from his earlier position of allowing a plebiscite under the UN and now said that it was unnecessary for a plebiscite to be held under the UN though it could send one or two observers if it wished to do so. However, India also made it clear that it would not under any circumstances postpone the plebiscite so as to allow the UN or Pakistan to send observers. A plebiscite was held on 20 February 1948, in which all but 91 out of 190,870 who voted (from an electorate of 201,457) voted to join India, i.e. 99.95% of the population voted to join India.

Douglas Brown of The Daily Telegraph as well as the Pakistani newspaper Dawn expressed concerns about the propriety of the plebiscite's arrangement. On 26 February, Pakistan termed India's proceeding with the plebiscite a "discourtesy to Pakistan and the Security Council". In the plebiscite India polled 222,184 votes and Pakistan 130 out of a total population of 720,000 of Junagadh and its feudatories.

Only 15 per cent (21,606) of Junagadh's Muslim population voted while 30 per cent (179,851) of the non-Muslim population voted. The total number of voters on electoral rolls was 200,569 and fewer than 10,000 Muslims voted for India. In Manavadar, 276 out of 520 Muslims voted for India, in Bantwa 19 out of 39, and 79 out of 231 in Sardargarh. In Bantwa and Babariawad the number of voters who cast their votes in India's favour was fewer than the number of non-Muslim voters there, which meant that even some non-Muslims did not vote for India. According to scholar Rakesh Ankit, India took liberties with facts and laws as it acted as the "judge, jury and executioner" of the entire situation.

== Later arrangements ==
After six months administration by Government of India, three civilian members (Samaldas Gandhi, Dayashankar Dave and Pushpaben Mehta) were inducted for the administration of Junagadh on 1 June 1948. The election of the seven constituencies of the Junagadh region for the Constitution Assembly of Saurashtra was declared in December 1948. All seven members of Indian National Congress were elected unopposed and they all voted to merge Junagadh State with Saurashtra State. The merger was completed in January 1949.

On 1 November 1956, Saurashtra State was merged with Bombay State. Bombay State was split into the linguistic states of Gujarat and Maharashtra in 1960, and Junagadh district is now one of the districts of Gujarat.

Pakistan brought the case of Junagadh to the United Nations in January 1948. The UN Security Council commanded its commission on Kashmir to examine the conflict over Junagadh. The Kashmir conflict eclipsed the matter of Junagadh at the United Nations Security Council, where Junagadh's case is still unresolved. Pakistan's official maps show Junagadh, Manavadar and Sir Creek as "Pakistani territory".

== See also ==
- Instrument of Accession (Jammu and Kashmir)
- Bantva Manavadar
- Pathans of Gujarat

== Bibliography ==
- Ankit, R. (2016), "The accession of Junagadh, 1947-48: Colonial sovereignty, state violence and post-independence India", Indian Economic & Social History Review, 53 (3): 371–404, doi:10.1177/0019464616651167, S2CID 147765080
- Bangash, Yaqoob Khan (2015), A Princely Affair: The Accession and Integration of the Princely States of Pakistan, 1947-1955, Oxford University Press, USA, ISBN 978-0-19-906649-0
- Copland, Ian (2002), The Princes of India in the Endgame of Empire, 1917-1947, Cambridge University Press, ISBN 978-0-521-89436-4
- McLeod, John (1999), Sovereignty, Power, Control: Politics in the States of Western India, 1916-1947, BRILL, ISBN 90-04-11343-6
- Pande, Aparna (2011). Explaining Pakistan's Foreign Policy: Escaping India. Taylor & Francis. ISBN 978-1-136-81894-3.
- Raghavan, Srinath (2010), War and Peace in Modern India, Palgrave Macmillan, pp. 101–, ISBN 978-1-137-00737-7
- Ramusack, Barbara N. (1988), "Congress and the People's Movement in Princely India: Ambivalence in Strategy and Organization", in Richard Sisson; Stanley Wolpert (eds.), Congress and Indian Nationalism: The Pre-independence Phase, University of California Press, pp. 377–404, ISBN 978-0-520-06041-8
- Yagnik, Achyut; Sheth, Suchitra (2005), Shaping of Modern Gujarat, Penguin UK, ISBN 978-8184751857
