= Ruswa Majhalumi =

Gujarati poet from India (1915–2008)

- Poet Ruswa Majhalumi
- Born: Imamuddin Murtaza Khan Babi; 11 December 1915; Mangrol, Gujarat
- Died: 14 February 2008 (aged 92)
- Education: Rajkumar College, Rajkot
- Occupation: Poet
- Writing career
- Pen name: Ruswa Majhalumi
- Language: Gujarati
- Genres: Ghazal
- Notable works: Madira (1972); Meena (1948)

Imamuddin Murtaza Khan Babi (better known by his pen name Ruswa Majhalumi), was a Gujarati language poet and a royal of Pajod state.

== Early life ==
He was born in Mangrol on 11 December 1915. He studied at the Rajkumar College, Rajkot from 1927 to 1934. Meena (1948) and Madira (1972) are two of his collections of Ghazal poetry. Dhalta Minara (1978) is an episodic portrait by him.

He belonged to Babi Dynasty and was the Chief of Pajod and associate of Sardargadh.

His son, Ayaazkhan Babi also studied at the Rajkumar College, Rajkot like his father and was the Principal having lived on the campus more than half his life.

He died on 14 February 2008.
