= Balanivav =

Village in Gujarat state, India

Balanivav is a village in Jafrabad Taluka of Amreli district, Gujarat, India. It is about ten miles north of Jafarabad.

== History ==
During British period, it was under the jurisdiction of Junagadh State. It was under Babariawad before taken over by Junagadh.
