= Nawab of Junagarh =

Rulers of Junagarh State in the British Raj

Nawab Bhadur Khan III in 1885, with officials

Nawab of Junagarh or Junagadh refers to the now defunct ex-lineage of rulers of the princely Junagarh State in British Raj, nowadays Junagadh district in the state of Gujarat in India.

== List of Nawabs of Junagarh ==
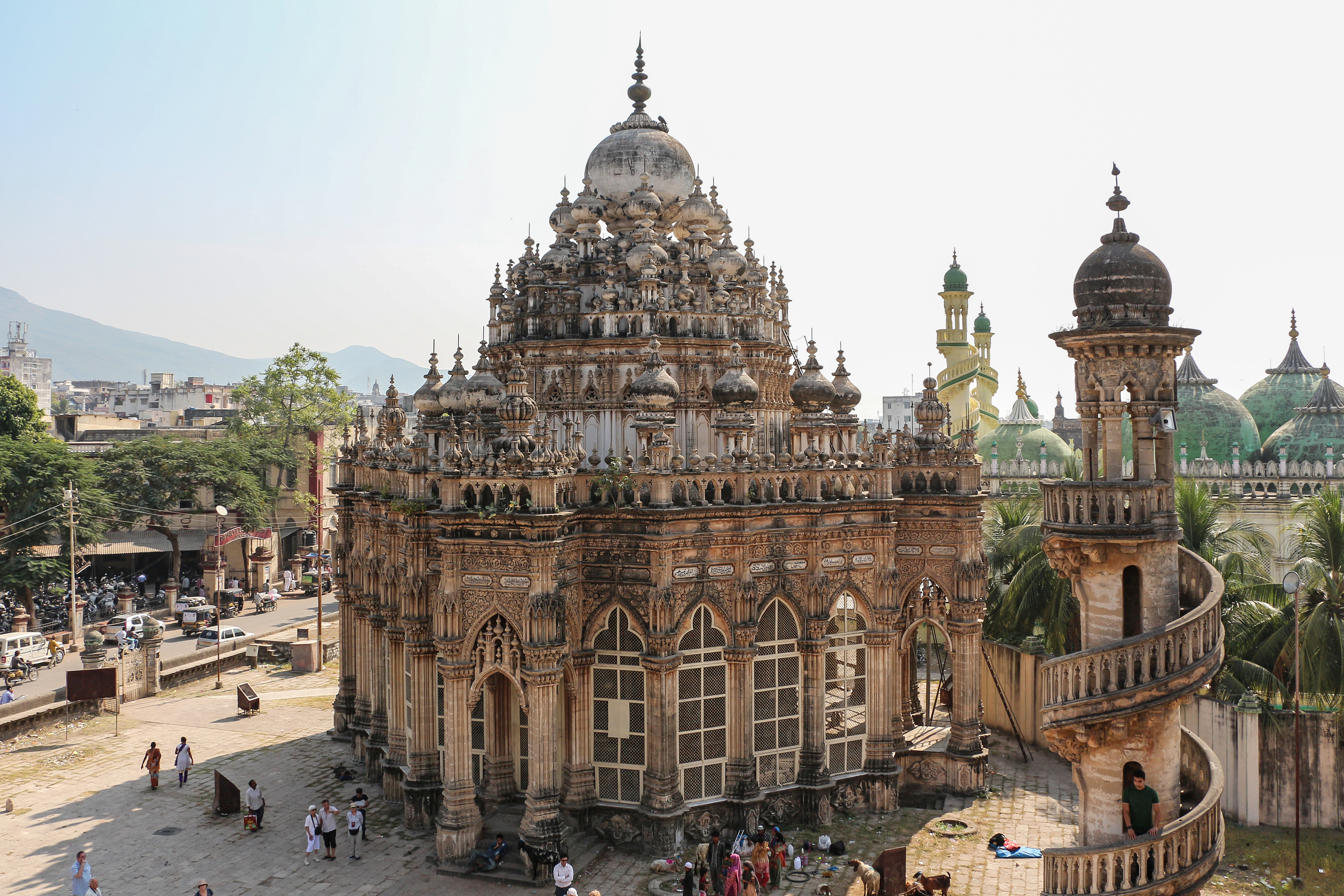
Tomb of Mahabat Khan

Given below is the list of Nawabs who ruled in the princely Junagarh State before the Partition of India. After the independence of India and Pakistan in 1947, the title of Nawab of Junagarh has no official status. It still carries respect in Pakistan and is used as a courtesy title.

Lineage
	Nawab	Reign	Life
1st	Nawab Muhammad Bahadur Khanji or Muhammad Sher Khan Babi	1730 – 28 Sep 1758	died 1758
2nd	Nawab Muhammad Mahabat Khanji l	28 Sep 1758 – 1760	died 1774
	Nawab Muzaffar Khanji	1760–1762	
2nd	Nawab Muhammad Mahabat Khanji	1762 – 2 Dec 1774	died 1774
3rd	Nawab Muhammad Hamid Khanji	2 Dec 1774 – 26 Feb 1811	1766–1811
4th	Nawab Muhammad Bahadur Khanji II	26 Feb 1811 – 26 May 1840	1795–1840
5th	Nawab Muhammad Hamid Khanji II	26 May 1840 – 1851	1828–1851
6th	Nawab Sir Muhammad Mahabat Khanji II	1851 – 29 Sep 1882	1838–1882
7th	Nawab Sir Muhammad Bahadur Khanji III	29 Sep 1882 – 21 Jan 1892	1856–1892
8th	Nawab Sir Muhammad Rasul Khanji Babi	23 Jan 1892 – 22 Jan 1911	1858–1911
9th	Mr. H.D Rendall ESQR, Administrator of Junagarh	1911–1920	
10th	Nawab Muhammad Mahabat Khanji III	22 Jan 1911 – 25 Feb 1948	1900–1959 as the last 'de facto' Nawab.

== Last Nawab ==
After the Partition of India in 1947, the decision of Nawab Muhammad Mahabat Khanji III, who was the last ruling Nawab of Junagadh, to accede Junagadh to the Dominion of Pakistan was followed by the Indian Army taking military action. The Nawab, a Muslim, was in favor of declaring the state as part of newly created Muslim majority Pakistan. For this purpose he signed the documents for incorporation of the princely state in Pakistan, in response rulers of two states that were subject to the suzerainty of Junagadh—Mangrol and Babariawad—reacted by declaring their independence from Junagadh and acceding to India. In response, the Nawab of Junagadh militarily occupied these vassal states. Sardar Patel saw this as an aggression upon State of India and called for military response. However, Jawaharlal Nehru waited to first establish the validity of accession of principality of Babariawad to India. Once this was established with Lord Mountbatten, on 22 September 1947, they sent a telegram to Dewan of Junagadh clarifying the legality of accession and to withdraw their troops from Babariawad. Further, Indian Army was ordered to go to Babariawad and get the territories in India's possession. The Nawab of Junagadh refused to vacate his troops from Babariawad and Mangrol. In October 1947 Nawab of Junagarh fled with his family to Pakistan. The Indian Army finally entered and captured Babariawad in November 1947 and stood on alert along borders of Junagadh and Mangrol for further orders. leading to the Indian annexation of Junagadh. After his exile, he settled down in Pakistan and the Junagarh family resides at the Junagarh House in Karachi, Pakistan.

== See also ==
- Pathans of Gujarat
- List of Sunni dynasties
- Babi dynasty
- Babai (Pashtun tribe)
- List of Pashtun empires and dynasties
