= Ghulam Moinuddin Khanji =

- Nawab; Khan
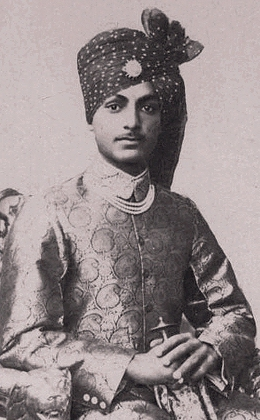
- Ghulam Moinuddin Khanji in 1940s.

Khan of Manavadar
- Reign: 19 October 1918 – 15 August 1947
- Predecessor: Fatehuddin Khanji
- Successor: Monarchy abolished
- Born: Ghulam Moinuddin Khanji; 22 December 1911; Manavadar, Bantva Manavadar, British India (present-day Gujarat, India)
- Died: 13 February 2003 (aged 91); Karachi, Sindh, Pakistan
- Begum: Qudsia Siddiqa, Nawab Abida
- Issue: Aslam Khan and 10 others
- Father: Fatehuddin Khanji
- Mother: Fatima Siddiqa Begum
- Religion: Islam
- Cricket career

Cricket information

Career statistics
Competition	FC
Matches	12
Runs scored	546
Batting average	27.30
100s/50s	0/4
Top score	88*
Balls bowled	240
Wickets	2
Bowling average	70.51
5 wickets in innings	0
10 wickets in match	0
Best bowling	2/86
Catches/stumpings	0
Medal record
Men's field hockey
Representing India
Western Asiatic Games
Gold medal – first place	1934 Delhi
- Source: ESPNcricinfo

Ghulam Moinuddin Khanji (22 December 1911 – 13 February 2003) was the ruler of Manavadar State, one of the princely states associated with British India. Although Khanji chose to accede to Pakistan after the partition of India, the state was soon annexed by India and a subsequent referendum resulted in a massive Indian victory.

An able sportsman, Khanji played first-class cricket for Western India and in his later life, was also the president of the Pakistan Hockey Federation.

== Early life ==
Khanji was born as Ghulam Moinuddin Khanji at Manavadar, Bantva Manavadar (in present-day Gujarat, India) on 22 December 1911. He was the eldest son of Nawab Fatehuddin Khanji. His mother, Fatima Siddiqa Begum was the second wife of Fatehuddin. Moinuddin graduated from Rajkumar College, Rajkot.

== Reign ==
Khanji ascended the throne of Manavadar on 19 October 1918 after the death of his father. Since he was only seven years old, his mother acted as regent until 1931, when 20-year-old Khanji's investiture took place.

Following the independence and partition of India in 1947, the princely states were invited to either join India or Pakistan or remain independent. On 24 September, Khanji acceded to the new Dominion of Pakistan. However, on the orders of the Deputy Prime Minister of India Vallabhbhai Patel, India annexed the state on 22 October. A referendum was held in Manavadar, Mangrol, and three other states. Out of 31,434 votes which were cast, 34 were in favour of Pakistan.

Khanji was initially put under house arrest at Songadh and later arrested at Rajkot. He was released as a result of the Liaquat–Nehru Pact of 8 April 1950 and left for Pakistan in 1951.

== Sportsman ==
Khanji was the founder of the Manavadar hockey team coached by Mirza Nasiruddin Masood. Under his captaincy, the team toured New Zealand and won all the matches in 1934. In the same year, he was a member of the India hockey team, representing the country at the Western Asiatic Games.

Khanji also played cricket and represented Western India in the Ranji Trophy between 1935 and 1941. After migrating to Pakistan, he became the president of the Pakistan Hockey Federation.

Khanji was sometime captain of the Ranji Trophy cricket team, besides leading Manavadar cricket and hockey teams in national and international expeditions.

== Personal life ==
Khanji married his first wife Qudsia Siddiqa Begum, daughter of the Nawab of Kurwai, on 14 November 1933. He married for a second time in July 1945 to Nawab Abida Begum. He had five sons and six daughters, the last of whom was born in 1963. His eldest son Aslam Khan was also a cricketer. One of Khanji's granddaughters, Sarwat Gilani, is an actress.

Khanji's full name, with titles, was Major Nawab Ghulam Moinuddin Khanji Fatehuddin Khanji Babi, Khan Sahib of Manavadar. He received the Hilal-e-Quaid-i-Azam in 1953.

Khanji died on 13 February 2003 at the age of 92 at Karachi, Sindh province.
