= Putliwale =

Regions with significant populations
- India (Lucknow, Uttar Pradesh)

Languages
- Urdu • Hindi

Religion
- Islam

Related ethnic groups
- Other Pashtuns • Pathans of Uttar Pradesh

The Putliwale are a Muslim community found in the state of Uttar Pradesh in India.
