= Runwala =

Rajput descendants

The Runwala, Ranwala or Ruala are an Indian social group believed to be descended from Rohila warrior group. They claim Rajput descent, but Rajputs do not have marital alliances with them. They are distributed in Indian states like Madhya Pradesh and Rajasthan.
