= Sardargarh Bantva =

Babai princely state of India

Coordinates: 25.2333°N 74.0000°E

Sardargardh Bantva was a princely state of India. Founded in 1733 by Khan Shri Sherzamankhanji Babi, the youngest son of Nawab Saheb Salabat Muhammadkhan Babi of Junagadh State, on the Kathiawar peninsula in Gujarat, India, they had an area of approximately 186 km^{2}, and contained 13 mostly Muslim villages. It was a non-salute state.

Upon the independence and partition of British India in August 1947, the princely states (which were not British) had the choice of joining either India or Pakistan or remaining independent. The decision in September 1947 of the ruling prince of Junagadh, Muhammad Mahabat Khan III, to accede his dominions as princely states of Pakistan led to a crisis, as most of his subjects were Hindus. In February 1948 came the Annexation of Junagadh, Bantva Manavadar, and Sardargadh Bantva by India, following a referendum. The last local ruler was Khan Shri Hussain Yavarkhanji Babi.

== See also ==
- Memon
- Bantva
- Bantva Manavadar
- Memoni
- Pathans of Gujarat
