= Muhammad Mahabat Khan III =

Last ruler of Junagadh, India (ruled 1911–1948)

Nawabzada Sir Muhammad Mahabat Khan III Khanji Nawab
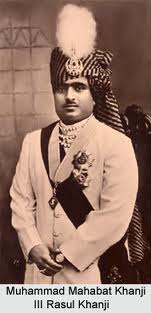

Nawab of Junagarh
- In office 22 January 1911 – 25 February 1948
- Succeeded by: Muhammad Dilawar Khanji (claimed)

Personal details
- Born: Muhammad Mahabat Khan; 2 August 1898 Junagadh, Junagadh State, British India
- Died: 17 November 1959 (aged 61) Karachi, Federal Capital Territory, Pakistan
- Cause of death: Cardiac arrest
- Children: Muhammad Dilawar Khanji (son)

Sir Muhammad Mahabat Khanji III Rasul Khanji, GCIE, KCSI (2 August 1898 – 17 November 1959) was the last ruling Nawab of the princely state of Junagadh in British India from 1911 to 1948. He was the father of Muhammad Dilawar Khanji, a former Governor of Sindh and his claimed successor. Famed for his extravagant lifestyle and his love of dogs, his decision to accede Junagadh to the Dominion of Pakistan following India's Independence led to the Indian Army taking military action. He is credited with pioneering a conservation effort in the Nawab of Junagarh's private hunting grounds, in what is now the Gir National Park, that saved India's last few lions from almost certain extinction.

== Early life ==
Nawabzada Muhammad Mahabat Khanji III was born on 2 August 1898 at Junagadh, the fourth son of HH Nawab Sir Muhammad Rasul Khanji, GCSI (1858–1911; r. 1892–1911). As the fourth son, Mahabat was not expected to succeed to the musnaid of Junagadh; however, following the death of his three elder brothers by the time he was eight, he was made heir apparent, and succeeded his father upon his death in 1911. Mahabat was educated at Mayo College, and ruled under a regency until his formal accession on 31 March 1920. The following year, he was raised to a 15-gun personal and local gun salute; in 1926, he was knighted.

== Reign ==
According to Sir Cyril Hancock, the former Resident of Western States, the Nawab was well loved by his people and the state was well administered. Hancock had a high opinion of Nawab's personal qualities.

During his reign, the Nawab oversaw the opening of the Willingdon Dam, the construction of the Bahadur Khanji Library (named after his ancestor, the first Nawab) and the opening of the Mahabat Khan Free College.

Mahabat Khanji was widely known for his love of animals, particularly dogs. At one point, he owned over 2000 high-pedigree dogs and is known to have spent several thousand rupees on grand birthday and 'marriage' parties for his favourite dogs. However, Mahabat Khanji's love for animals also extended to the regional wildlife, particularly the Asiatic lion, which at the time was on the verge of extinction in India. The Nawab helped to forestall this by preserving vast tracts of the Gir forest in order to provide the lions with a stable habitat. He was also interested in animal husbandry, and his efforts in the field served to greatly improve the breeding stock of the local Kathiawari stallions and of the Gir cows.

== Accession conflict ==
At the time of Indian independence in August 1947, all of the princely states were advised to accede to either of the two dominions of India or Pakistan. By 15 August 1947, most of these states in the interior of India had chosen to accede to India.

Nawab Mahabat Khan, however, spent the summer of 1947 on holiday in Europe. In his absence, his dewan, Sir Shah Nawaz Bhutto, ran the affairs of the state, and he consulted with Muhammad Ali Jinnah to join the state to Pakistan. On 11 August 1947, upon his return from his holiday, the Nawab made the decision to accede to Pakistan and sent an emissary to negotiate with Jinnah.

Junagadh's population was predominantly Hindu, with the Muslim population accounting for only about a fifth of its total population.

With Pakistan's acceptance of Junagadh's accession on 16 September, the Indian government invaded Junagadh and took drastic action, inducing two of the Nawab's vassals, Mangrol and Babariyawad, to accede to India. The first Home Minister of independent India, Sardar Vallabhbhai Patel, played a major role in this regard.

Sir Mahabat Khanji, his family (including his dogs), and his dewan (prime minister), Sir Shah Nawaz Bhutto, fled by plane to Pakistan on 24 October, never to return. Reportedly one of his begums and her child were left behind in the chaotic escape. Bhutto wrote to Samaldas Gandhi, leader of the Arzi Hukumat (or government in exile), to take over Junagadh.

The Indian Army then took over Junagadh on 9 November, installed a new state Governor, and called for a public referendum on the status of the state. The referendum, arranged by the Indian government, was held on 20 February 1948. Of over 200,000 people who voted, 91 percent chose India while the rest chose Pakistan. The following year, on 20 January 1949, Junagadh was merged into the new Indian state of Saurashtra.

== Exile and death ==
After his exile from Junagadh, Sir Mahabat Khanji and his family settled at Karachi, where he died, aged 61, on 17 November 1959 . He was succeeded by his eldest son, Muhammad Dilawar Khanji, who claimed to be rightful Nawab of the state in absentia. The former Junagadh princely family still resides in Karachi.

== Honours ==
- Delhi Durbar Medal - 1911
- Knight Commander of the Order of the Star of India (KCSI)-1926
- Knight Grand Commander of the Order of the Indian Empire (GCIE)-1931
- King George V Silver Jubilee Medal-1935
- King George VI Coronation Medal-1937
- Pakistan Independence Medal (Tamgha-e-Pakistan) -1948
- Order of the Great Leader, 1st Class (Nishan-i-Quaid-i-Azam) – 1957

== See also ==
- Junagadh
- Pathans of Gujarat

== Bibliography ==
- Ankit, R. (2016), "The accession of Junagadh, 1947–48: Colonial sovereignty, state violence and post-independence India", Indian Economic & Social History Review, 53 (3): 371–404, doi:10.1177/0019464616651167, S2CID 147765080
- Hodson, H. V. (1969), The Great Divide: Britain, India, Pakistan, London: Hutchinson, ISBN 9780090971503
- Raghavan, Srinath (2010), War and Peace in Modern India, Palgrave Macmillan, ISBN 978-1-137-00737-7
