= Sher Khanji Babi =

Founder of the Babi Dynasty of India (17th century)

Muhammad Sher Khan Babai
- Nawāb
- Born: c. 17th century
- House: Babai
- Dynasty: Babi
- Father: Bahadur Khan Babai
- Religion: Sunni Islam

Shēr Khānji Babi was the Afghan founder of the Babi dynasty of Hindustan.

Muhammad Sher Khan Ji hailed from the Babai clan of Pashtuns. He served as a distinguished officer in the Imperial service in Delhi. His forefather was Adil Khan Babi of Kandahar who came to India with Humayun. Sher Khanji was a deputy governor of Saurashtra who would go on to establish the Babi dynasty.
