= Rohilla =

Pashtun-descended ethnic group of Uttar Pradesh, India

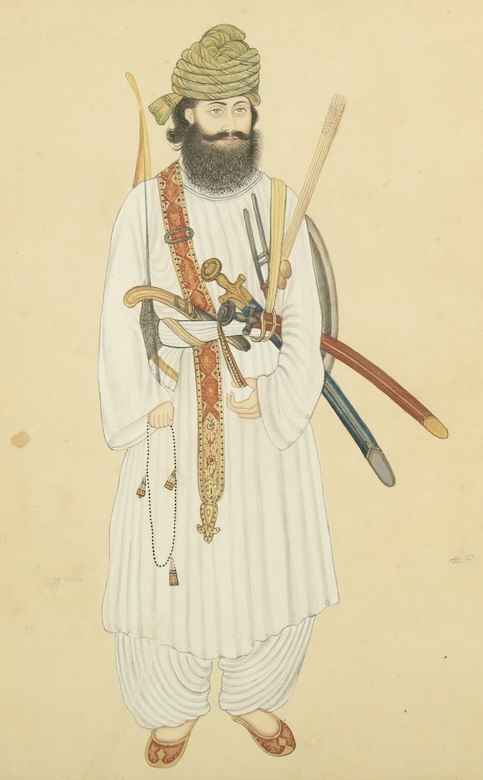
- 18th Century Portrait of North Indian Rohilla Pashtun Recruit

Total population
- 369,582 (2011)

Regions with significant populations
- India (Rohilkhand), Pakistan (Karachi)

Languages
- Urdu • Hindustani • Pashto

Religion
- Islam

Related ethnic groups
- Pathans of Uttar Pradesh, Urdu-speaking people, other Pashtun tribes

Rohillas (Note: also spelt Ruhelā or Ruhillah) are a community of Pashtun heritage, historically found in Rohilkhand, a region in the state of Uttar Pradesh, India. It forms the largest Pashtun diaspora community in India, and has given its name to the Rohilkhand region. The Rohilla military chiefs settled in this region of northern India in the 1720s, the first of whom was Ali Mohammed Khan.

The Rohillas are found all over Uttar Pradesh, but are more concentrated in the Rohilkhand regions of Bareilly and Moradabad divisions and Rampur divisions. After the 1947 Partition of India, some of the Rohillas migrated to Karachi, Pakistan as a part of the Muhajir community.

== Demographics ==
Historical population of Rohilla People in India
Year	Pop.	±% p.a.
1951	210,586	—
1961	234,754	+1.09%
1971	259,847	+1.02%
1981	289,934	+1.10%
1991	314,823	+0.83%
2001	339,716	+0.76%
2011	369,582	+0.85%

== Origin ==
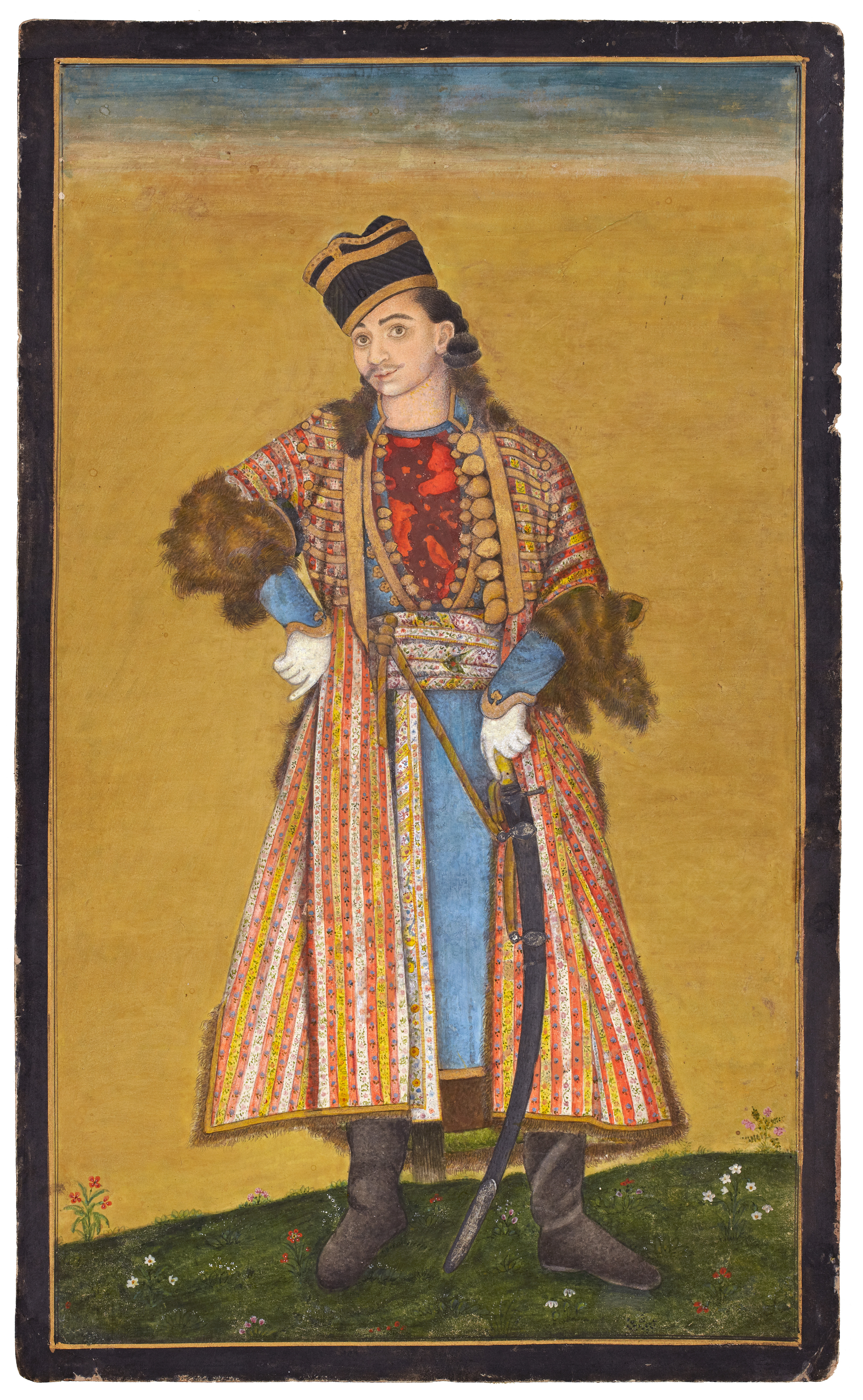
Miniature. "Portrait of a Rohilla Afghan", Northern India; 1821–1822. An inscription on the back identifies him as a member of the Barech family

The Indian term "Rohilla" originated from Roh, meaning the hilly country, where Rohilla was used as a fairly broad notion of the people from Roh. Later Roh referred to a geographical term which corresponded with, in its limited sense, the territory stretching from Swat and Bajaur in the north to Sibi in the south, and from Hasan Abdal (Attock) in the east to Kabul and Kandahar in the west, which corresponded with the homeland of the Pashtuns. The Pashtun or primarily Yusufzai migrations towards Northern India could be traced to their expulsion from Kandahar due to the Turko-Mongol invasions, who were subsequently resettled in Kabul, where they were again dispelled by the Timurids and forced to settle in Swat, where they assimilated the native Dardic and Tajik Dehqan population, who were collectively termed Yusufzais to the outside. A further migration continued towards Northern India, where typically inhabitants in the valley without land and those seeking trade opportunities quitted the country of Roh and migrated to India. The immigration of Pashtuns from the Peshawar valley was further exacerbated with the collapse of Mughal authority and the invasion of Nader Shah.

This community over generations had become culturally closer to the Awadh region between Katehr and Awadh. In the 1700s, the decentralization of Mughal power allowed for the rise of Rohilla power in Katehar, with the rise of Ali Muhammad Khan's territories, in the context of the rise of other elements such as the Marathas, Jats and the Sikhs. This region, called Katehar by the Hindus, and Sambhal-Moradabad by the Muslims, was already known as one of the most troublesome regions for its turbulence and rebelliousness under the Katehriya Rajputs, especially since the Delhi Sultanate. In this respect the Rohillas were following their footsteps. As Ali Muhammad occupied Katehar, and had invited a large number of people from Roh, it was during his lifetime that the land of Katehr was named Rohilkhand which means the land of the Rohillas. The settlers from Roh consisted primarily of Pashtuns of the Mandarr Yousafzai tribe, as well as the Khattak, Bunerwal Yousafzais, Muhammadzai and Afridi tribes who were inhabitants of the Peshawar valley and the Barech from Kandahār. A majority of Rohillas migrated from Pashtunistan to North India between the 17th and 18th century.. Finally, a large number of newer Pashtun arrivals from the Northwest swelled their ranks, who were termed "Vilayati". All were collectively termed Rohillas, thus the Rohillas were in the process of developing a real or fictive kinship based on newly forged marriage alliances, consisting of Indian Pathan families, converted Hindus and new arrivals from the Northwest.

== History ==
=== Early history ===
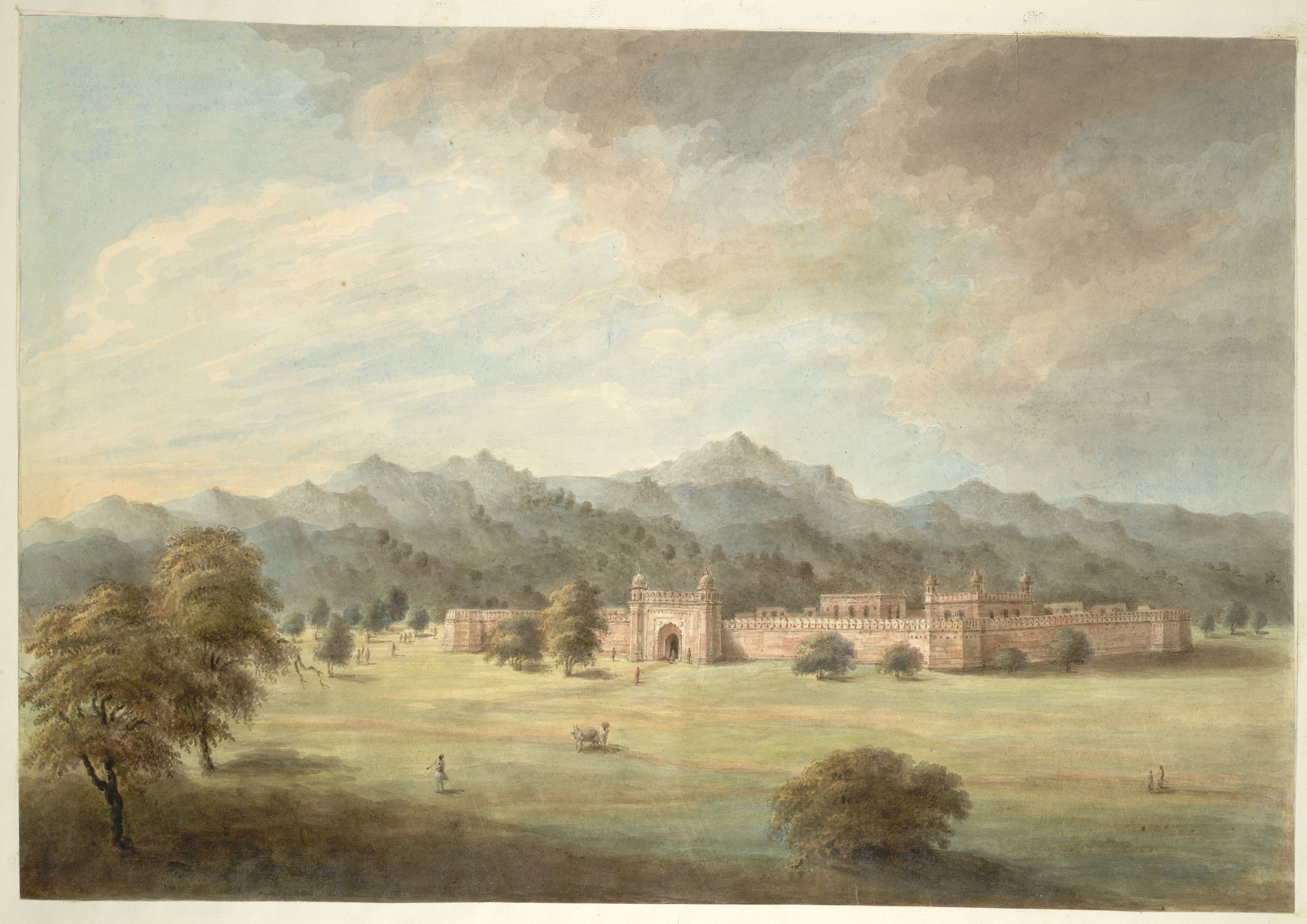
Patthargarh fort outside Najibabad, built by Najib-ud-Daula in 1755. 1814–15 painting.

The founder of the state of Rohilkhand was Ali Muhammad Khan who was a Jat boy of age of eight when he was adopted by Daud Khan Barech. The first immigrant to the Katehr region was Shah Alam Khan, who had settled in Katehr in 1673 and had brought along a band of his tribe, the Barech. His son Daud Khan gained a number of villages in the Katehr region by working for the Mughals and various Rajput Zamindars. Originally, some 20,000 soldiers from various Pashtun tribes as mercenaries had immigrated to the region. Daud Khan adopted two Hindus, converted them to Islam, and provided them a proper religious education. These were Ali Muhammad Khan and Fath Khan-i-Saman. They were trained as mercenaries, and the former was put at the head of his following, which included both Pashtuns and various Hindustanis.

==== Establishment of the Rohilla state ====
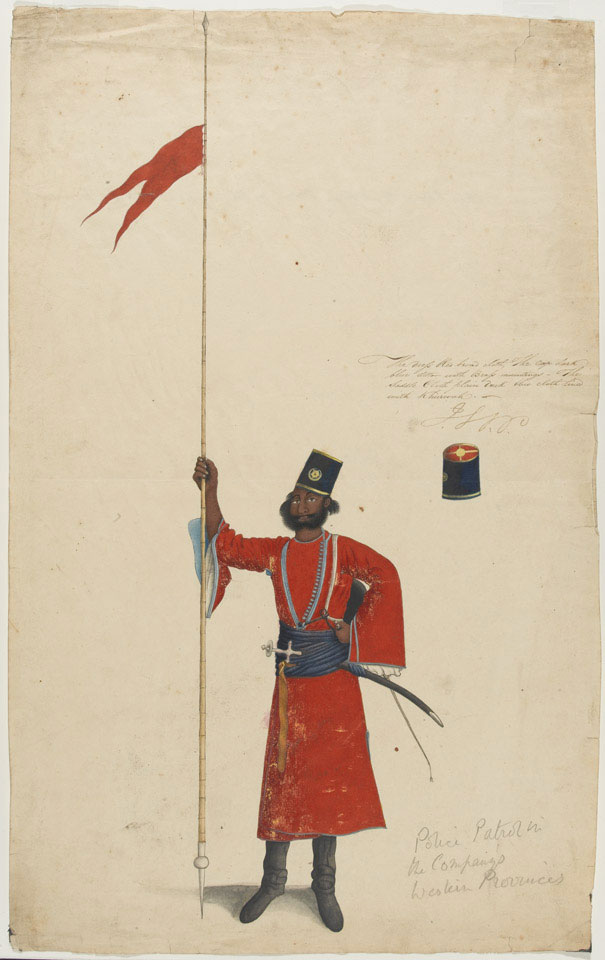
Sowar of Rohilla Cavalry, Watercolour on European paper, by a Company artist, 1815

The rise of the Rohilla state owed mainly to Ali Muhammed Khan, who succeeded Daud Khan's jagirs in 1721. The Rohillas being a mixture of old pedigree Indian Pathan families, Indian converts and new adventurers from the northwest, were in the process of developing a real or fictive kinship based on newly forged marriage alliances. Ali Muhammad Khan distinguished himself by helping in suppressing the rebellion of the Indian Muslim Barah Sayyid tribe, who controlled the upper Doab under the Mughal Empire, and who had under their chief Saifudddin Barha put the Mughal governor Marhamat Khan and all of his followers to death. As a reward Ali Muhammad Khan was given the title of Nawab by Muhammad Shah in 1737. He became so powerful that he refused to send tax revenues to the central government. Ali Muhammad Khan defeated Despat, the Banjara chief who held Philbit. In 1744, Ali Muhammad Khan tried to invade Kumaon with a well-prepared army that was 10,000 men strong. In late 1743, he tried to capture Almora, after which the king Kalyan Chand fled and sought the protection of the Raja of Garhwal, who forgave his previous mutual animosity and offered military support. As Ali Muhammad Khan burnt down the temple of Jageshwar, the Rohillas were faced by a combined Garhwal and Kumaon army which defeated Ali Muhammad Khan at the battle of Kairarau, forcing the rohilla to sue for peace. Safdar Jang, the Nawab of Oudh, warned the Mughal emperor Muhammad Shah of the growing power of the Rohillas. This caused Mohammed Shah to send an expedition against him as a result of which he surrendered to imperial forces. He was taken to Delhi as a prisoner, but was later pardoned and appointed governor of Sirhind. Most of his soldiers had already settled in the Katehar region during Nadir Shah's invasion of northern India in 1739, increasing the Rohilla population in the area to 100,000. Due to the large settlement of Rohilla Pashtuns, this part of Katehar region came to be known as Rohilkhand. The conversion of Hindus to Islam further resulted in its rapid growth. As Ali Muhammad Khan returned to Rohilkhand, Bareilly was made the capital of this newly formed Rohilkhand state.

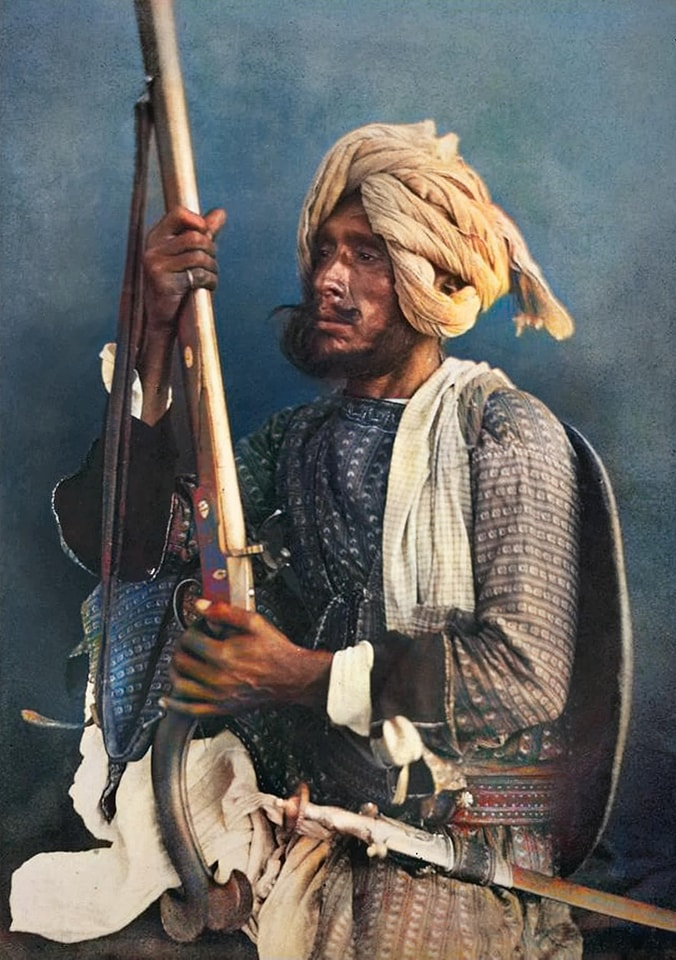
Portrait of a Rohilla warrior

When Ali Muhammad Khan died, leaving six sons. However, two of his elder sons were in Afghanistan at the time of his death while the other four were too young to assume the leadership of Rohilkhand. As a result, power transferred to other Rohilla Sardars, where Sadullah Khan was made the nominal head of the state. Faizullah Khan retained Bareilly, Dundi Khan gained Moradabad and Bisauli, Fath Khan-i-Saman was placed in charge of Badaun and Usehat, Mulla Sardar Bakhshi gained Kot and Hafiz Rahmat Khan Barech gained Salempur or Pilibhit. In 1755, Qutb Shah Rohilla, who was not a Rohilla by caste, but came to be known as a Rohilla as a preceptor and fighter of the Indian Rohillas, raised the standard of rebellion in Saharanpur against the Wazir Imad-ul-Mulk, who had taken his jagirs and given them to the Marathas. Mian Qutb Shah defeated the Mughal army at Karnal, and plundered the adjoining towns until he conquered the town of Sirhind. When he was completely defeated in his attempt to enter the Jalandhar Doab, he was forced to abandon all his territory. The Marathas invaded Rohilkhand, and as the chiefs could offer no effective resistance, they fled to the Terai, whence they sought the aid of Shuja-ud-Daula of Awadh. Shuja-ud-Daulah came to their aid, and their combined forces in November 1759 drove the Marathas across the Ganges, after inflicting severe losses upon them. Qutb Khan Rohilla defeated and beheaded the Maratha general Dattaji at Burari Ghat.

=== Following the Battle of Panipat in 1761 ===
In the Third Battle of Panipat (1761) one of the Rohilla Sardars, Najib-ud-Daula, allied himself with Ahmad Shah Abdali (Note: Ahmad Shah Abdali (died 1772) adopted the title of Durr-i Dowran (pearl of pearls), which gave the name to the dynasty he established, the Durrani, which lasted in Afghanistan until 1973) against the Marathas. He not only provided 40,000 Rohilla troops but also 70 guns to the allied. He also convinced Shuja-ud-Daula, the Nawab of Oudh, to join Ahmad Shah Abdali's forces against the Marathas. In this battle, the Marathas were defeated and as a consequence the Rohilla increased in power.

The Marathas invaded Rohilkhand to retaliate against the Rohillas' participation in the Panipat war. The Marathas under the leadership of the Maratha ruler Mahadji Shinde entered the land of Sardar Najib-ud-Daula which was held by his son Zabita Khan after the sardar's death. Zabita Khan initially resisted the attack with Sayyid Khan and Saadat Khan behaving with gallantry, but was eventually defeated with the death of Saadat Khan by the Marathas and was forced to flee to the camp of Shuja-ud-Daula and his country was ravaged by Marathas. Shah Alam II held the captured the family of Zabita Khan and Maratha ruler Mahadji Shinde looted his fort and desecrated the grave of Najib ad-Dawlah. With the fleeing of the Rohillas, the rest of the country was burnt, with the exception of the city of Amroha, which was defended by some thousands of Amrohi Sayyid tribes. The Rohillas who could offer no resistance fled to the Terai whence the remaining Sardar Hafiz Rahmat Khan Barech sought assistance in an agreement formed with the Nawab of Oudh, Shuja-ud-Daula, by which the Rohillas agreed to pay four million rupees in return for military help against the Marathas. Hafiz Rehmat, abhoring unnecessary violence unlike the outlook of his fellow Rohillas such as Ali Muhammad and Najib Khan, prided himself on his role as a political mediator and sought the alliance with Awadh to keep the Marathas out of Rohilkhand. He bound himself to pay on behalf of the Rohillas. However, after he refused to pay, Oudh attacked the Rohillas.

Afterwards, the Rohillas were attacked by the neighbouring kingdom of Oudh led by the Nawab Shuja-ud-Daula and his principal sardars, Basant Ali Khan, Mahbub Ali Khan, and Sayyid Ali Khan. The Nawab also received assistance from an East India Company force under the command of Colonel Alexander Champion. Hafiz Rehmat was joined by the Indian Pathans of Farrukhabad in the Doab and the Rajput yeomanry. This conflict is known as the Rohilla War. When Hafiz Rahmat Khan Barech was killed, in April 1774, Rohilla resistance crumbled, and Rohilkhand was annexed by the kingdom of Oudh. Shuja-ud-Daulah spread his troops to murder, plunder and commit every on the peasantry. The Rohillas under Faizullah Khan, Ahmad Khan Bakhshi, Ahmad Khan-i-Saman, the son of Fath Khan-i-saman retired to the hills at Lal Dang and started a guerrilla war to avenge their defeat. Warren Hastings' role in the conflict was publicized during his impeachment.

From 1774 to 1799, the region was administered by Khwaja Almas Khan, a Jat Muslim eunuch convert from Hoshiarpur, Punjab, as representative of the Awadh (Kingdom of Oudh) rulers. This period was particularly tough for the Rohillas, as Almas Khan made every effort to violently extract wealth from the inhabitants. Almas Khan carved out a principality and possessed a considerable army like the Nawab. In 1799, the British East India Company annexed the territory, and started to pay a pension to the family of Hafiz Rahmat Khan.

=== Establishment of Rampur State ===
Princely flag of Rampur.

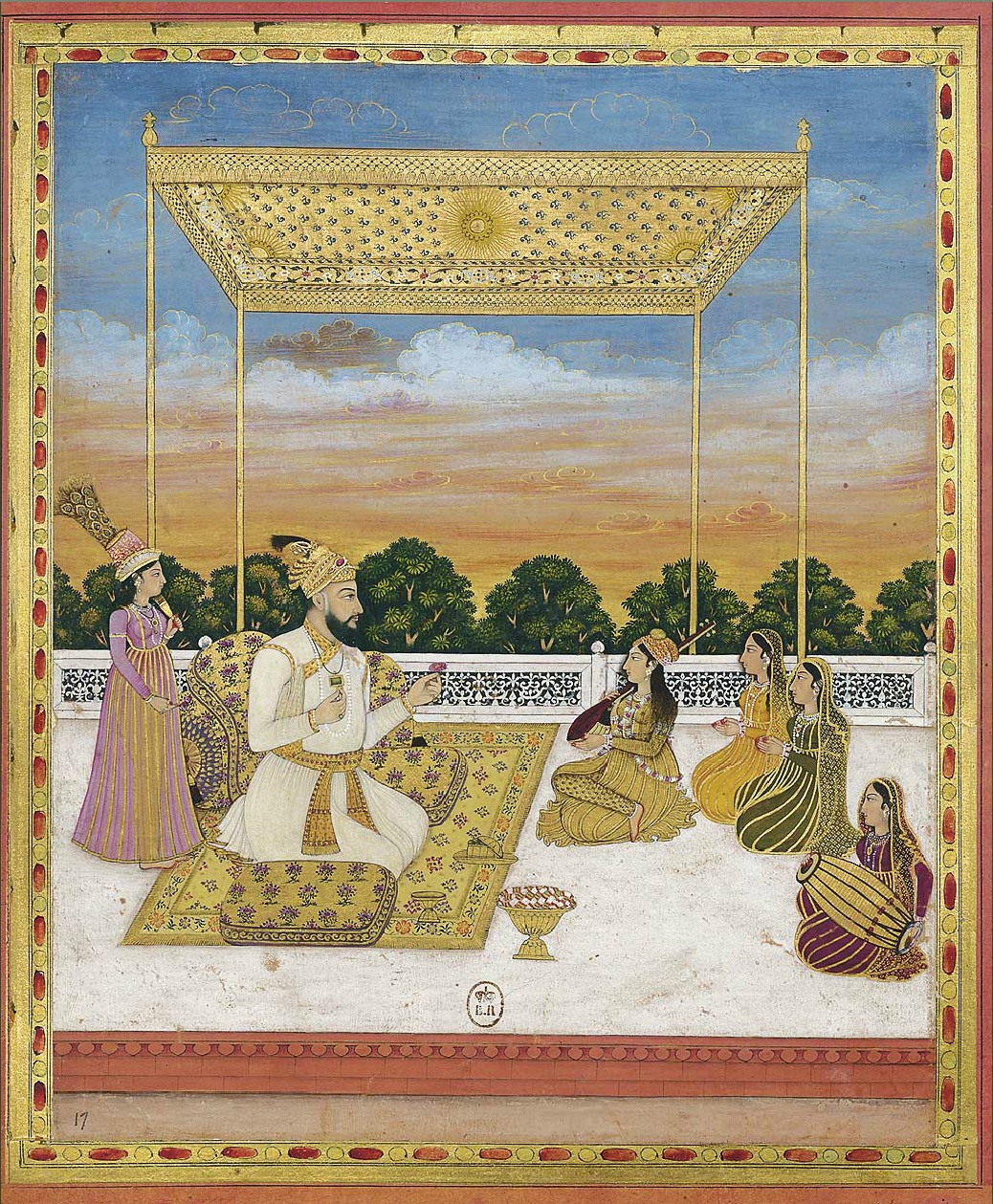
Nawab Muhammad Khan Bangash, ca 1730, Bibliothèque nationale de France, Paris

While most of Rohilkhand was annexed, the Rohilla State of Rampur was established by Nawab Faizullah Khan on 7 October 1774 in the presence of Colonel Alexander Champion, and remained a compliant state under British protection thereafter. The first stone of the new Fort at Rampur was laid in 1775 by Nawab Faizullah Khan. The first Nawab proposed to rename the city Faizabad, but many other places were known by that name so its name was changed to Mustafabad. Faizullah Khan suppressed a rebellion of Hurmat Khan, the son of Hafiz Rehmat, and sent a force of horse under Muhammad Umar Khan help the British defeat the Sikh attacks in Bijnor.

The Qissa-o-Ahwal-i-Rohilla written by Rustam Ali Bijnori in 1776 provides an example of the refined Urdu prose of the Muslim Rohilla elite in Rohilkhand and Katehr.

Nawab Faizullah Khan ruled for 20 years. He was a patron of education and began the collection of Arabic, Persian, Turkish and Hindustani manuscripts which are now housed in the Rampur Raza Library. After his death his son Muhammad Ali Khan took over. He was assassinated by Rohilla elders after reigning for 24 days, and Muhammad Ali Khan's brother, Ghulam Muhammad Khan, was proclaimed Nawab. The East India Company took exception to this, and after a reign of just 3 months and 22 days, Ghulam Muhammad Khan was besieged and defeated by East India Company forces. The East India Company supported Muhammad Ali Khan's son, Ahmad Ali Khan, to be the new Nawab. He ruled for 44 years. He did not have any sons, so Muhammad Saeed Khan, son of Ghulam Muhammad Khan, took over as the new Nawab after his death. He established Courts and improved the economic conditions of farmers. His son Muhammad Yusuf Ali Khan took over after his death and his son, Kalb Ali Khan, became the new Nawab after his death in 1865.

Nawab of Rampur		Reign Began	Reign Ended
2	Faizullah Khan	15 September 1774	24 July 1793
3	Muhammad Ali Khan Bahadur	24 July 1793	11 August 1793
4	Ghulam Muhammad Khan Bahadur	11 August 1793	24 October 1794
5	Ahmad Ali Khan Bahadur	24 October 1794	5 July 1840
–	Nasrullah Khan – Regent	24 October 1794	1811
6	Muhammad Said Khan Bahadur	5 July 1840	1 April 1855
7	Yusef Ali Khan Bahadur	1 April 1855	21 April 1865
8	Kalb Ali Khan Bahadur	21 April 1865	23 March 1887
9	Muhammad Mushtaq Ali Khan Bahadur	23 March 1887	25 February 1889
10	Hamid Ali Khan Bahadur	25 February 1889	20 June 1930
–	General Azeemudin Khan – Regent	25 February 1889	4 April 1894
11	Raza Ali Khan Bahadur	20 June 1930	6 March 1966
12	Murtaza Ali Khan Bahadur – Nawabat abolished in 1971	6 March 1966	8 February 1982
13	Murad Ali Khan Bahadur	8 February 1982	Incumbent

=== Between 1774 and 1857 ===
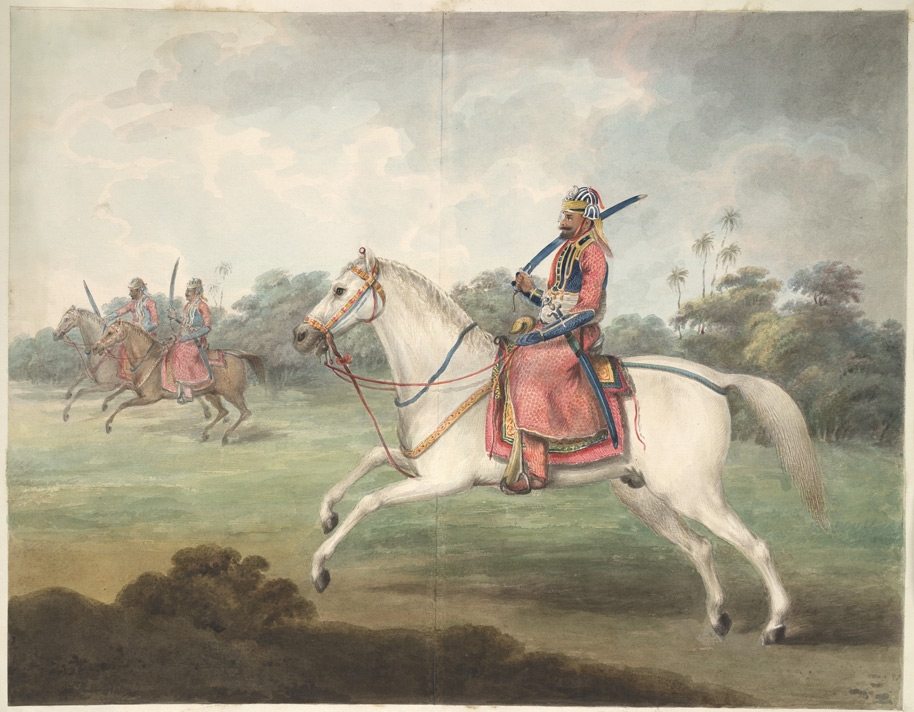
Rohilla horsemen in the British Indian army, 1814

They were generally settled in villages, in many of which they own and cultivate the soil, and in some of which they formed large brotherhoods, approaching those of Jats and Rajputs, with a similar constitution. Evidence from 1857 suggests that the survival of degrees of Pathan-derived lineage based identity in villagers of the old Rohilkhand districts. These identities were marked as much by signs of assimilation and transformation as any continuity.

=== Between 1857 and 1947 ===
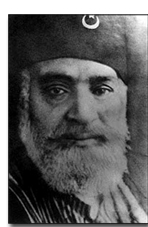
Shaukat Ali was a leader of the Khilafat Movement

The period between the revolt of 1857 and the independence of India in 1947 was a period of stability for the Rohilla community. In 1858, the British colonial government issued a general pardon to all those who had taken part in the Indian Rebellion and restored many lands. Some of the tribes were punished for aiding the rebels. Some tribes had to migrate to Delhi and Gurgaon, while others migrated to the Deccan region. Conditions improved after some years and migration from the North West Frontier Province and Afghanistan recommenced, adding to the Rohilla population. During this period, the Rohillas were also effected by the reformist movement of Sir Syed Ahmed Khan, with many taking to modern education. The founder of the Barelvi sect of Sunni Islam, Ahmad Raza Khan, was also born among the Rohillas and the city of Bareilly became an important centre of Islamic learning in Northern India.

While a majority of Rohillas remained landowners and cultivators, a significant minority took to western education, and entered professions such as law and medicine. They also began to take an interest in the political debates during the last decade of the 19th Century. Some of them joined the newly formed Indian National Congress, while others were attracted to pan-Islamism. This period also saw a wholesale adoption of North Indian Muslim culture, with Urdu becoming the native language of the Rohilla. In fact the term of Rohilla was slowly replaced with the term "Pathan", which was a new self-identification. However a sense of distinct identity remained strong, with the Rohillas residing in distinct quarters of cities, such as, Kakar Tola, Pani Tola and Gali Nawaban in Bareilly, which was home to the descendants of Hafiz Rahmat Khan. There were intermarriages with neighbouring Muslim communities such as the Shaikh, Muslim Rajput and Kamboh. Thus at the dawn of independence, the Rohilla were losing their distinct community status.

=== Post 1947 ===
Following the 1947 Partition of India, the Rohilla community—predominantly concentrated in the Rohilkhand region of Uttar Pradesh—experienced a significant demographic and political shift. While a large portion of the population remained in India, many members of the Rohilla clans migrated to Pakistan, settling primarily in Karachi, Sindh, and parts of Punjab. In the post-independence era, Rohillas rose to prominence in the top tiers of civil and military administration in both nations. In India, Zakir Husain, a descendant of the Rohilla Afridi clan, served as the third President of India (1967–1969), symbolizing the community's integration into the secular democratic fabric of the country. In Pakistan, the Rohilla diaspora exerted considerable influence through high-ranking military and diplomatic figures. General Rahimuddin Khan served as a long-standing Governor of Balochistan and later Sindh, while Sahibzada Yaqub Khan, a scion of the Rampur royal family, became one of Pakistan's most distinguished diplomats and long-serving Foreign Ministers. Other notable figures, such as the legal scholar Nasim Hasan Shah, further underscored the community's transition from an 18th-century military aristocracy to a modern socio-political elite across the subcontinent.

== Present circumstances ==
The independence of India and the creation of Pakistan in 1947 had a profound effect on the Rohilla community. During the partition of India in 1947, some Rohillas moved to Pakistan.

=== In India ===
The Rohilla, part of the Pathan community, form one of the ethnic groups of Uttar Pradesh and are found throughout the state, with settlements in the cities of Rampur, Bareilly, and Shahjahanpur in Rohilkhand, being the densest in Rampur, the seat of the Royal House of Rampur. The Rohillas are known for their rich cuisine.

=== In Pakistan ===
In Pakistan, the Rohillas and other Urdu-speaking Pathans have now assimilated into the larger Urdu speaking community. There is no sense of corporate identity among the descendants of Rohilla Pathans in Pakistan with high degree of intermarriage with other Muslims. They mainly live in Karachi, Hyderabad, Sukkur, Dera Ismail Khan, Pharpur, Rangpur, Haripur, Abbottabad and other urban areas of Sindh.

== Rohillas ==
- Najib ad-Dawlah, House Chief of Rohilkhand.
- Laeeq Ahmed, TV compere/commentator, TV host, educationist.
- Shaukat Ali, Indian Muslim member of the Khilafat Movement.
- Ahmad Khan Bangash, Nawab of Farrukhabad.
- Muhammad Khan Bangash, Nawab of Farrukhabad.
- Hafiz Rahmat Khan Barech, the Regent of Rohilkhand.
- Zakir Husain, former president of India.
- Dr. Jamil Jalibi, Urdu linguist
- Mohammad Ali Jauhar, Indian Muslim activist, founding member of the All-India Muslim League.
- Abdul Qadeer Khan, father of Pakistan's nuclear missile project.
- Aiman Khan, model, actor.
- Ajit Khan, classic Bollywood film actor
- Alamgir Khan, PTI leader
- Amir Khan, MQM leader.
- Ayaz Khan, actor, comedian.
- Ayeza Khan, actor, model.
- General Bakht Khan, War Hero of the Indian War of Independence
- Faizullah Khan, Nawab of Rohilkhand.
- Hakim Ajmal Khan, physician in Delhi, India, and one of the founders of the Jamia Millia Islamia University.
- Iqbal Muhammad Ali Khan, MQM leader.
- Kiran Khan, TV host, model, actor.
- Mahira Khan, actor, model.
- Naimatullah Khan, former mayor of Karachi.
- Sahabzada Yaqub Khan, military general.
- Shahryar Khan, former PCB chairman.
- Turrebaz Khan, freedom fighter who led the Indian Revolution of 1857 in Hyderabad
- Shaista Lodhi, TV host, actor.
- Josh Malihabadi, Shayar-e-Inqalab, poet.
- Irfan Pathan, cricketer.
- Yusuf Pathan, cricketer, politician, Member of the Lok Sabha.
- Behroze Sabzwari, actor.

== See also ==
- Rohilla dynasty
- Pathans of Uttar Pradesh
- Pathans of Punjab
- Pathans of Sindh
- Pathans of Gujarat
