= Mangrol, Gujarat =

Mangrol
- Town
- Location in Gujarat, India Mangrol (India)
- Coordinates: 21.12°N 70.12°E
- Country: India
- State: Gujarat
- District: Junagadh
- Elevation: 18 m (59 ft)

Population (2001)
  - Total: 55,094

Languages
  - Official: Gujarati
- Time zone: UTC+5:30 (IST)
- PIN: 362225
- Vehicle registration: GJ
- Website: gujaratindia.com

Mangrol is a town and a minor port in Junagadh district in the state of Gujarat, western India. It was formerly the seat of the princely state of Mangrol. Pin code of Mangrol is 362225.

== Geography ==
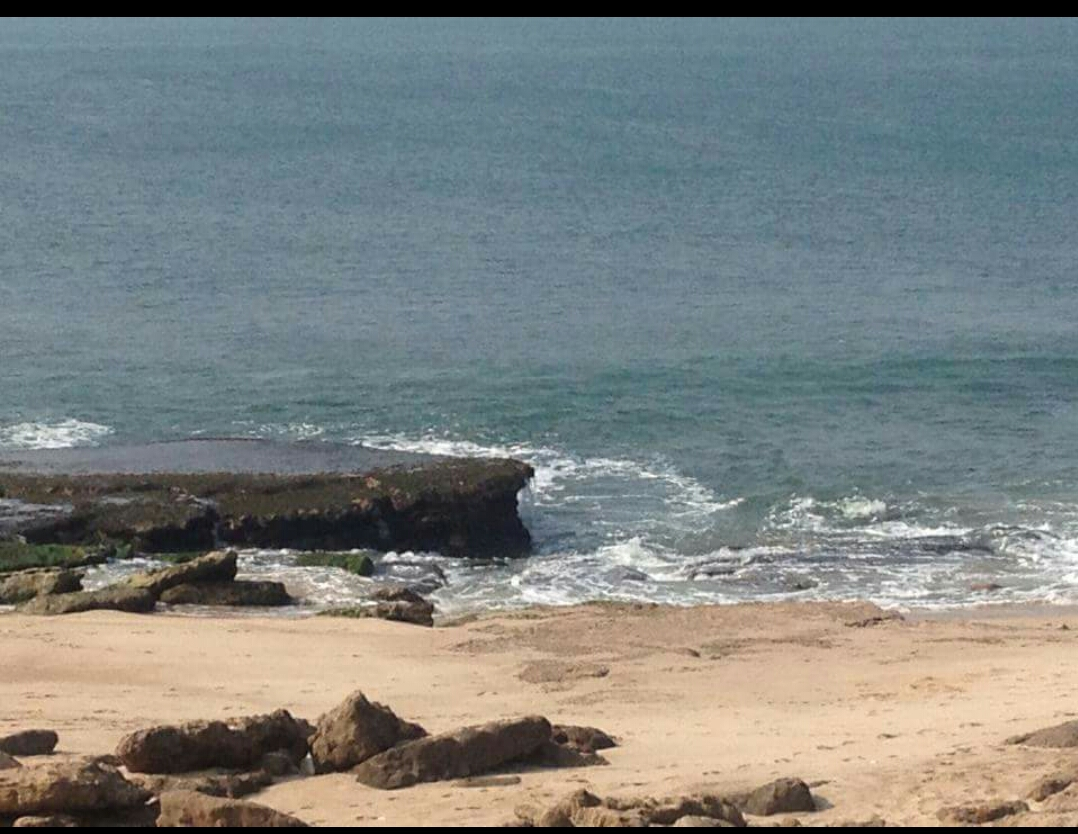
Mangrol beach

Mangrol is located at 21.12°N 70.12°E. It has an average elevation of 18 metres (59 feet).

== Demographics ==
As of 2001 India census, Mangrol had a population of 55,094. Males constitute 51% of the population and females 49%. Mangrol has an average literacy rate of 58%, lower than the national average of 59.5%: male literacy is 69%, and female literacy is 48%. In Mangrol, 16% of the population is under 6 years of age.

== Educational institutes ==
- Tower Pay Cen School - Government primary school in city with DISE CODE 24120706402.
- Tirupati school - Gujarati medium School in Mangrol
- Shri Shardagram - Historic Institutional Campus is under Shri Bharat Sarswati Mandir Sansad, Mangrol.
- MMEW High School in Government

The institution was established in 1973 by Shri Kulinbhai Desai & Smt Vasanti Bahen Desai.At present KG section & Std 1st to 12th classes run by the school management. "Service to the nation" is the motto of the institute.

== Fishing industry ==
Mangrol is an important harbour as far as the fish industry is considered. There are many fisheries located here and it exports to many European nations. The fishermen of Mangrol are infamous for being caught numerous times by the Pakistan Coast Guard for entering their naval territories in search of fish.
