= Muhammad Dilawar Khanji =

Pakistani politician

Muhammad Dilawar Khanji મુહમ્મદ દિલાવર ખાન محمد دلاور خان جی

11th Governor of Sindh
- In office 1 March 1976 – 28 June 1977
- President: Fazal Ilahi Chaudhry
- Prime Minister: Zulfikar Ali Bhutto
- Preceded by: Ra'ana Liaquat Ali Khan
- Succeeded by: Muhammad Jahangir Khanji

Nawab of Junagarh
- In office 1959–1989
- Preceded by: Muhammad Mahabat Khan III
- Succeeded by: Muhammad Jahangir Khanji

Personal details
- Born: 27 February 1918 Junagadh, Junagadh State, British India
- Died: 30 August 1989 (aged 71) Karachi, Sindh, Pakistan
- Cause of death: Lung cancer
- Children: 4, including Nawabzada Muhammad Jahangir Khanji (son)
- Parent: Muhammad Mahabat Khan III (father)

Muhammad Dilawar Khanji (Gujarati: મુહમ્મદ દિલાવર ખાન, Urdu: محمد دلاور خان جی) (23 June 1918 – 30 July 1989) was a Pakistani politician who was 11th Governor of Sindh from 1 March 1976 to 5 July 1977. He also claimed to be the titular Nawab of Junagarh from 1959 to 1989.

== Early life ==
Muhammad Dilawar was born in Junagarh to Muhammad Mahabat Khan III, who was the last Nawab of Junagarh state.

== Politics and later life ==
He was appointed as the Governor of Sindh in 1976 by Zulfiqar Ali Bhutto. On 5 July 1977, chief of army staff Muhammad Zia-ul-Haq deposed Bhutto in a bloodless coup. General Zia-ul-Haq imposed martial law in the country and dissolved the Provincial and Federal governments. As a result of Coup d'état 1977, Nawab Khanji was removed as a Governor of Sindh. He died of lung cancer on 30 July 1989. His eldest son, Muhammad Jahangir Khanji, became the titular claimant to the defunct Junagarh Nawabi title.
