= Babai (Pashtun tribe) =

Pashtun tribe living in Afghanistan

The Babai (Pashto: بابئی or باباې) is a Pashtun tribe also known as Babi. Their traditional primary homeland is Quetta, Qalat (located in Southern Afghanistan) and Kandahar. It expands across Afghanistan and Pakistan.

The tribe speaks the most archaic and soft dialect Pashto language, referred to as Kandahari Pashto dialect or the Southern Dialect.

Babai is one of the sons of Ghorghasht & related to Kakar & Ghorghashti Tribes in the hierarchy of Tribal Confederation.

== Geographical distribution ==
Their traditional primary homeland is Quetta, Qalat (located in Southern Afghanistan) and Kandahar. It expands across Afghanistan and Pakistan.

The tribe speaks the most archaic and soft dialect Pashto language, referred to as Kandahari Pashto dialect or the Southern Dialect.

Babai is one of the sons of Ghorghasht & related to Kakar & Ghorghashti Tribes in the hierarchy of Tribal Confederation. Khan of Babai Tribe " Khan Abdul Aziz Khan descendants lives in Quetta, they have a very rich historical background and have a huge amount of land called JO_e_Babai. جوئے باببئ in the central of Quetta.The descendants of Babai tribe in also living in different regions of the province such as swabi mardan and in Swat. In swat they are in good numbers in union council Pirkaly, Arkot, beha, khwaza khela and other parts of the valley

The Rulers/Nawabs of the Babi dynasty in India, belonged to the Babai tribe including the founder, Sher Khan Babi.

== See also ==
- Pashtun tribes
- Pathans of Gujarat
- List of Muslim dynasties
- Babi dynasty
- Nawab of Junagarh
