= Pathans of Uttar Pradesh =

Muslim community in Uttar Pradesh, India

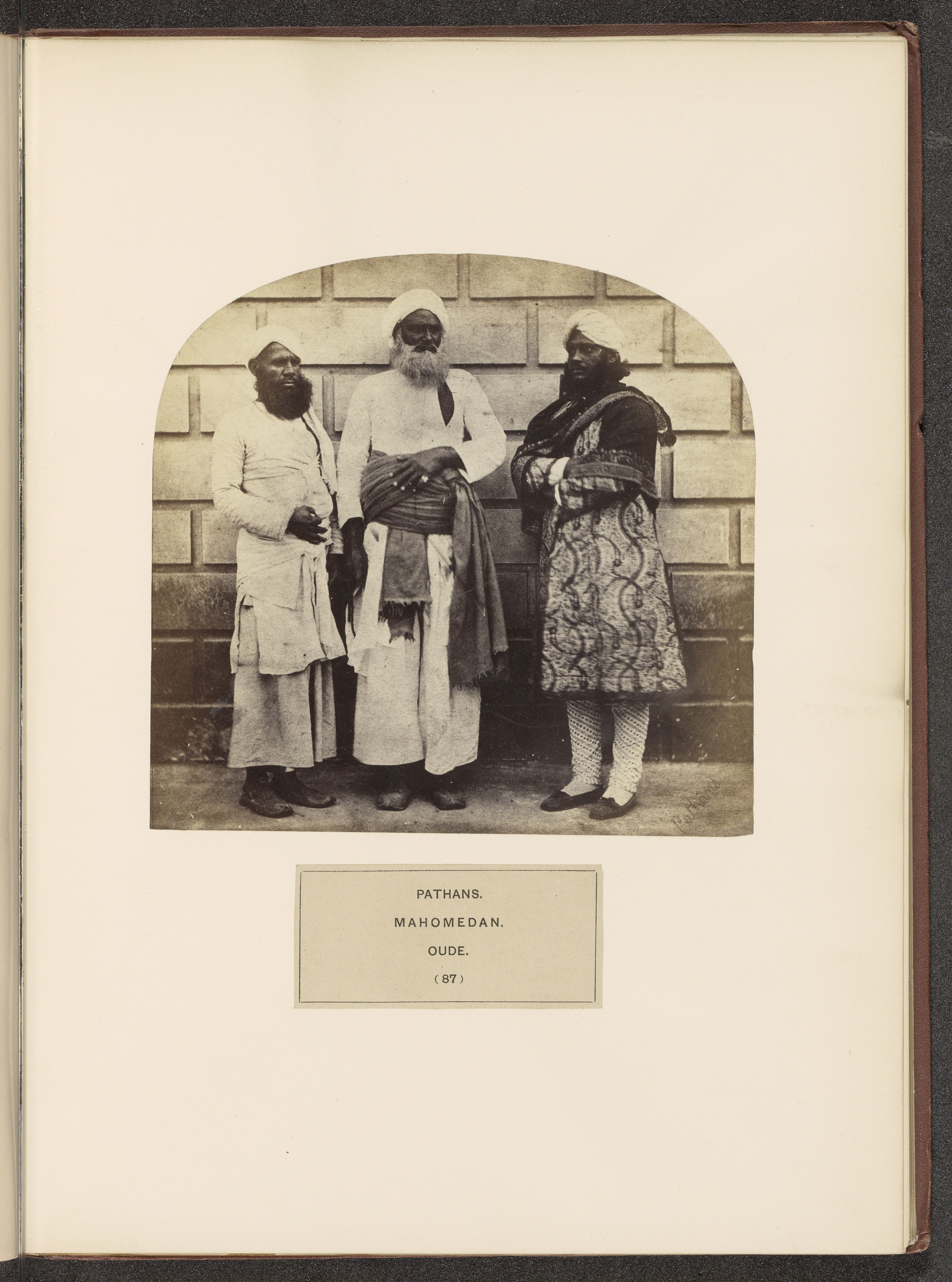
- Pathans in Oudh c.1868

Total population
- 4,997,000

Regions with significant populations
- India (Uttar Pradesh and Uttarakhand),

Languages
- Currently spoken: Urdu •Hindi (Kannauji, Braj, Awadhi) • Bhojpuri • English; Traditional: Pashto

Religion
- Islam

Related ethnic groups
- Urdu-speaking people, Pathans of Gujarat and the Pathans of India

The Pashtuns or Pathans are an Urdu-speaking community of ancestral Pashtun descent in the Uttar Pradesh state in India who form one of the largest Muslim communities in the state with a population of 5-6 million and 2.9% of the total population of Uttar Pradesh. They are also known as Khans which is a commonly used surname amongst them; although not all those who use the surname are Pathans, for example the Khanzada community of eastern Uttar Pradesh are also commonly known as Khan. The phrase Pathan Khanzada is used to describe Muslim Rajput groups, found mainly in Gorakhpur, who have been absorbed into the Pathan community. There are communities of partial Pashtun ancestry in the Rohilkhand region and in parts of the Doab and Awadh regions, such as the agrarian Rohilla community.

== History ==
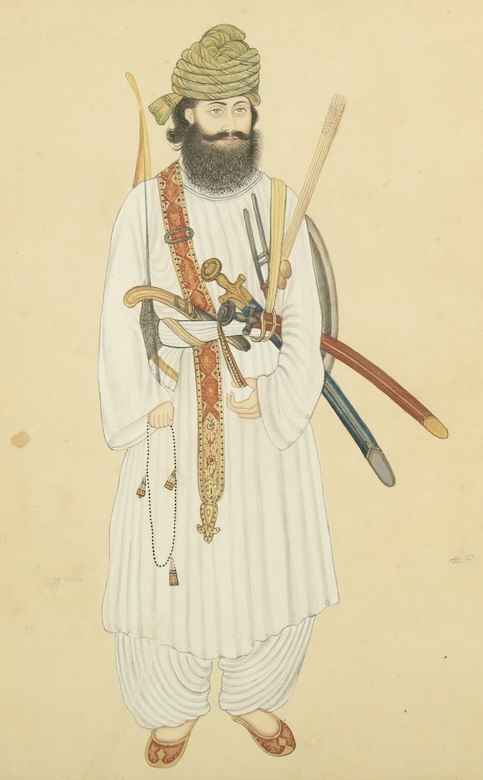
18th Century Portrait of North Indian Pashtun Recruit

The Pathan are divided into sixteen groupings, who generally take their name from the ancestral Pashtun tribes. These include the Bangash, Afridi, Dustukhel, Luni (Miani), Jadoon, Bakarzai, Barech, Daudzai, Dilazak, Durrani, Ghorghushti, Toia Mehsud Khel, Ghori, Khalil, Lodi, Mohmand, Mohammadzai, Orakzai, Kakarzai, Rohilla, Sherwani, Suri, Sultani and Yousafzai, all of which are well known Pashtun tribes. A further differentiation exists based on an identity known as the qabila or biradari, based on territorial subgroupings and community ties.

== Pathans of Western Uttar Pradesh ==
The Pathans of the Barah-Basti villages of Bulandshahr produced a large number of volunteers who joined the British Irregular Cavalry, many of whom rebelled during the Indian Rebellion of 1857 under Abdul Latif Khan of Khanpur and Walidad Khan of Malagarh.

== Pathans of Moradabad ==
According to gazetteer of Moradabad district , the Pathans numbered 23,026 persons, representing about 5.47% of the Muslim population at the time of the recorded census. They were particularly numerous in the Sambhal and Bilari tahsils. The Pathan population consisted of several clans, the largest being the Yusufzais with 5,851 persons, followed by the Ghoris with 4,043 and the Lodis with 2,289. Other notable groups included the Dilazaks with 1,036 and the Muhammadzais with 1,029. The district records also mention Bangash, Khataks, Ghilzais, Farzand-khel, Bunerwals, Barech and Tarins among the other Pathan groups.

== See also ==
- Pathans of Bihar
- Pathans of Gujarat
- Pathans of Punjab
- List of Pathan people in India
