= Babariawad =

Former principality in Junagadh

Babariawad was a small principality under suzerainty of the Princely State of Junagadh. During British India, was the easternmost district of Princely State of Junagadh, in south central Kathiawar. It consisted then of some 51 villages and city of Rajula.

In 1947, upon Partition of India, the Jagirdars of Babariawad, along with the principality of Mangrol, declared their independence from Junagadh and declared their accession to Union of India. The Nawab of Junagadh did not approve the accessions and prevailed upon Sheikh of Mangrol to renounce his accession to India and sent his troops to occupy the Babariawad. Sardar Patel saw this as an aggression upon State of India and called for military response. However, Jawaharlal Nehru wanted to first establish the validity of accession of principality of Babariawad to India. Once this was established with Lord Mountbatten, on 22 September 1947, they sent a telegram to Dewan of Junagadh clarifying the legality of accession and to withdraw their troops from Babariawad.

Further, Indian Army was ordered to go to Babariawad and get the territories in India's possession. The Nawab of Junagadh refused to vacate his troops from Babariawad and Mangrol. In October of 1947, Nawab of Junagarh fled with his family to Pakistan. The Indian Army finally entered and occupied Babariawad in November 1947 and stood on alert along borders of Junagadh and Mangrol for further orders leading to the integration of Junagadh into Union of India.
