= Babar (Pashtun tribe) =

Pashtun tribe

Bāborī بابر
- Location: Afghanistan, Khyber Pakhtunkhwa (Nowshera) and Balochistan
- Parent tribe: Sarbani
- Language: Pashto

Babar (Pashto: بابور) or Bāborī (Pashto: بابوري) are a tribe of Pashtuns residing in Afghanistan as well as Khyber Pakhtunkhwa and Balochistan in Pakistan.

The Babar tribe residing east of the Takht-e-Sulaiman were exempt from paying tax during the reign of Timur Shah Durrani and Shah Zaman.

== Notable people ==
- Naseerullah Babar, former Governor of Khyber Pakhtunkhwa
