= Instrument of Accession =

Historic treaty for princely states to join India or Pakistan

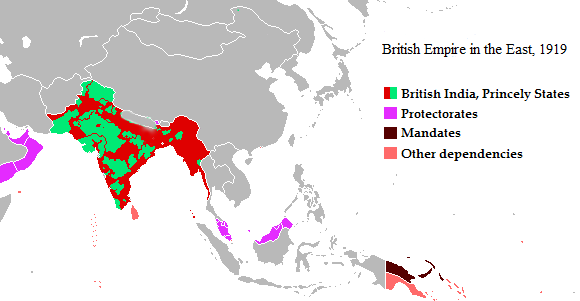
The British Empire in the East, 1919: Princely states Areas under direct British rule

The Instrument of Accession was a legal document legislated by the Parliament of the United Kingdom in the Government of India Act 1935, that was used in 1947 to enable each of the rulers of the princely states under British paramountcy to join one of the new dominions of India or Pakistan created by the Partition of British India.

The instruments of accession executed by the rulers, provided for the accession of states to the Dominion of India (or Pakistan) on three subjects, namely, defence, external affairs and communications.

== Background ==
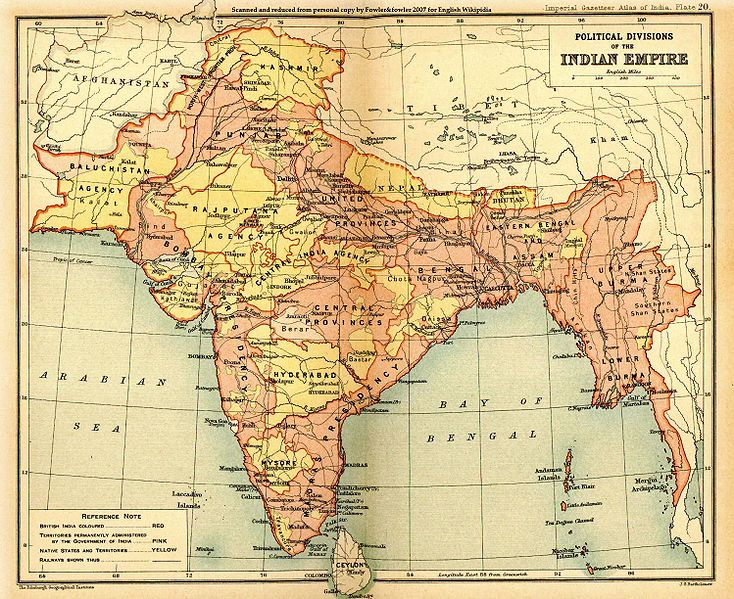
Political divisions of the Indian Empire in 1909 with British India in pink and the native states in yellow.

565 princely states existed in India during the British Raj. These were not parts of British India, having never become possessions of the British Crown, but were tied to the Crown by various treaties and were under the suzerainty of the Crown. British India and the princely states were together referred to as the "Indian Empire", commonly called "India".

The Government of India Act 1935 introduced the concept of the Instrument of Accession, wherein a ruler of a princely state could accede his kingdom into the 'Federation of India'. The federation concept was initially opposed by the Indian princes, but it is believed that they came around to its acceptance by the beginning of World War II.

In 1947, the British finalised their plans for leaving India, and the question of the future of the princely states was a conundrum for them. As they were not British possessions, they could not be partitioned by the British between the new sovereign dominions of India and Pakistan. The Indian Independence Act 1947 provided that the suzerainty of the British Crown over the princely states would simply be terminated, effective 15 August 1947. That would leave the princely states completely independent, even though many of them had been dependent on the Government of India for defence, finance, and other infrastructure. With independence, it would then be a matter for each ruler of a state to decide whether to accede to India or Pakistan, independence for princely states ruled out—they would join either India or Pakistan.

== Standard template ==
A standard form was used:

Instrument of Accession of . . . . . . . . . . . . . . . . . . . . . . . . . . . . . . . . . . . .

Whereas, the Indian Independence Act, 1947, provides that as from the fifteenth day of August, 1947, there shall be set up an independent Dominion known as INDIA, and that the Government of India Act, 1935, shall, with such omissions, additions, adaptations and modification as the Governor-General may by order specify be applicable to the Dominion of India;

And whereas the Government of India Act, 1935, as so adapted by the Governor-General provides that an Indian State may accede to the Dominion of India by an Instrument of Accession executed by the Ruler thereof:

Now therefore I . . . . . . . . . . . . . . . . . . . . . . . . . . . . . . . . . . . . . . . . . . . . . . . . . . . . . . . . . . . . Ruler of . . . . . . . . . . . . . . . . . . . . . . . . . . . . . . . . . . . . . . . . . . . . . . . . . . . . . . . . . . . . . . . . . . . . . . . . . . . . . . . . . . . . in the exercise of my sovereignty in and over my said State Do hereby execute this my Instrument of Accession and

1. I hereby declare that I accede to the Dominion of India with the intent that the Governor-General of India, the Dominion Legislature, the Federal Court and any other Dominion authority established for the purposes of the Dominion shall, by virtue of this my Instrument of Accession but subject always to the terms thereof, and for the purposes only of the Dominion, exercise in relation to the State of . . . . . . . . . . . . . . . . . . . . . . . . . . . . . . . . . . . . (hereinafter referred to as "this State") such functions as may be vested in them by or under the Government of India Act, 1935, as in force in the Dominion of India on the 15th day of August, 1947 (which Act as so in force is hereinafter referred to as "the Act").

2. I hereby assume the obligation of ensuring that due effect is given to the provisions of the Act within this state so far as they are applicable therein by virtue of this my Instrument of Accession.

3. I accept the matters specified in the Schedule hereto as the matters with respect to which the Dominion Legislature may make laws for this State.

4. I hereby declare that I accede to the Dominion of India, on the assurance that if an agreement is made between the Governor-General and the Ruler of this State whereby any functions in relation to the administration in this State of any law of the Dominion Legislature shall be exercised by the Ruler of this State, then any such agreement shall be deemed to form part of this Instrument and shall be construed and have effect accordingly.

5. The terms of this my Instrument of Accession shall not be varied by any amendment of the Act or of the Indian Independence Act, 1947, unless such amendment is accepted by me by an Instrument supplementary to this Instrument.

6. Nothing in this Instrument shall empower the Dominion Legislature to make any law for this State authorising the compulsory acquisition of land for any purpose, but I hereby undertake that should the Dominion for the purposes of a Dominion law which applies in this State deem it necessary to acquire any land, I will at their request acquire the land at their expense or if the land belongs to me transfer it to them on such terms as may be agreed, or, in default of agreement, determined by an arbitrator to be appointed by the Chief Justice of India.

7. Nothing in this Instrument shall be deemed to commit me in any way to acceptance of any future constitution of India or to fetter my discretion to enter into arrangements with the Government of India under any such future constitution.

8. Nothing in this Instrument affects the continuance of my sovereignty in and over this State, or, save as provided by or under this Instrument, the exercise of any powers, authority and rights now enjoyed by me as Ruler of this state or the validity of any law at present in force in this State.

9. I hereby declare that I execute this Instrument on behalf of this State and that any reference in this Instrument to me or to the Ruler of the State is to be construed as including a reference to my heirs and successors.

Given under my hand this. . . . . . . . . . . . . . . . . . . . . . . . . . . . . . . . . . . .day of August, Nineteen hundred and forty-seven.

. . . . . . . . . . . . . . . . . . . . . . . . . . . . . .

I do hereby accept this Instrument of Accession.

Dated this. . . . . . . . . . . . . . . . . . . . . . . . . . . . . .day of August, Nineteen hundred and forty-seven.

. . . . . . . . . . . . . . . . . . . . . . . . . . . . . .

(Governor-General of India)

== Accession of states to the new Dominions ==
The Instrument of Accession was the legal document designed to bring about accession, where a ruler had decided upon it. It was executed by the rulers of each of the princely states, individually, on the one hand, but took effect only if then accepted by the Government of India or the Government of Pakistan.

Among the more momentous of such accessions was that concerning Jammu and Kashmir, as executed on 26 October 1947 by Maharaja Hari Singh, ruler of Jammu and Kashmir. It gave control of the defence and external relations of the state to the government of India. The accession of Jammu and Kashmir was accepted by Lord Mountbatten of Burma, Governor-General of India, on 27 October 1947.

== See also ==
- Instrument of Accession of Junagadh
- Instrument of Accession of Jammu and Kashmir
- Annexation of Hyderabad
- Bantva Manavadar
- Accession of Kalat
