= Pathans of Bihar =

Historical settlement in South Asia

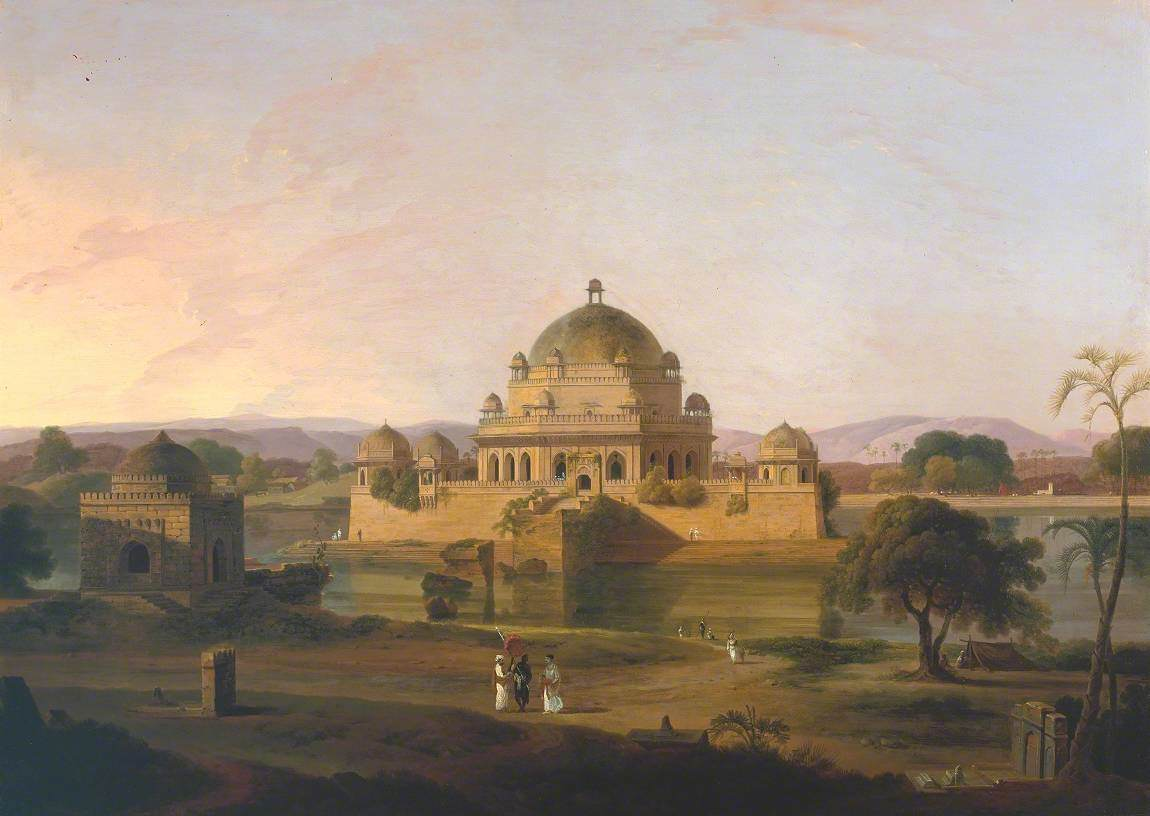
Sur Empire era tomb

Pathans of Bihar are descendants of Pashtuns, historically referred to by the ethnonym of Afghans that settled in eastern Hindustan in the region of Bihar as a part of its Muslim community.

== History ==
Bihar first came under Muslim rule during the conquests of Muhammad of Ghor from the Ghurid Empire of Afghanistan. The Muslim conquests in the eastern regions were led by Muhammad Bakhtiyar Khalji where a semi-independent Khalji state was established. Olaf Caroe writes that it was the beginning of Khalji and Afghan history in the region.

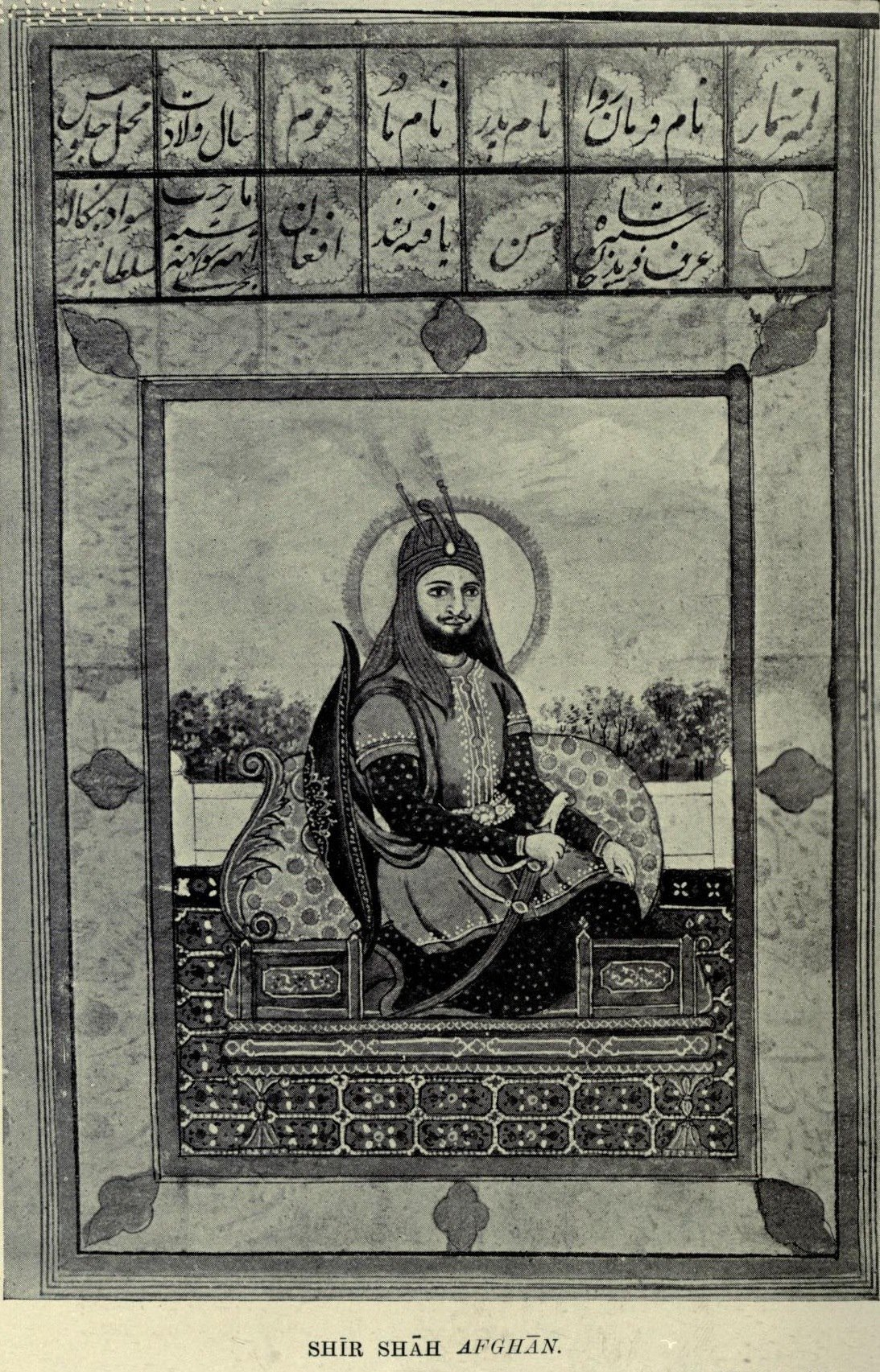
Sher Shāh Suri, Sultan of Bihar and Hindustan

The Delhi Sultanate was established after the Ghurid era and the region of Bihar came under the Lodi rule of Sikandar II. The Lodi sovereign allotted jagirs to Afghans that arrived to eastern India such as at Sasaram in Bihar where the chiefs rose to prominence. From here a Pashtun chief raised in Sasaram who became known as Sher Khan for his valour in saving the Governor of Bihar from a tiger, became the ruler of Bihar in the 16th century, his reign of effective governance brought great prosperity to Bihar that remained unmatched forever afterwards. The city of Sasaram would initially serve as the capital city of Sher Khan, who became known as Sher Shah Suri after he conquered the Mughal Empire and established the Sur Empire from Bihar.

After the collapse of the Surids ensuing the death of Sher Shāh, Bihar came under the dominion of the Karrani dynasty of Pashtun origin. Bihar was ruled by Sulaiman Khan Karrani who was succeeded by his son, Daud Khan who was defeated at Raj Mahal. Bihar then fell under the expansion of Akbar the Great.

== Settlement ==
The early Pathans of Bihar date to the era of Muslim rule including various medieval Pashtun dynasties in eastern Hind from which the descendants of Pashtuns settled in and became a local community of present-day Bihar. They also settled in the historical area of Patna in the Afghan ruled province of Bihar where the Pathan population of Patna were known residents since the 12th century. according to the Bihar caste survey the Pathan population numbered 986,665 or 0.75% of the state population.

The Pathans, synonymously known as Khāns in the region are settled in the districts of Gaya, Nawada, Aurangabad, Patna, Munger, Darbhanga, Muzaffarpur, Saran, Bhagalpur, Ranchi and Hazaribagh, Koderma.

== Society ==
The Pathans in Bihar, members of the broader Pathan community of India speak the Magahi language of the region that they are settled in. They are generally endogamous but do engage in matrimonial relations with other Muslims communities, such as the Sheikh community.

== Clans ==
The notable tribes of Pashtuns whom the Pathans of Bihar ancestrally belong to are the Sur, Yusufzai Bettani, Durrani, Lodi, Ghauri, Bangash and Qizilbash. This flow of migration in the medieval and early modern period were from the diverse tribes and confederations of the Pashtunistan region that settled all across the length of Hindustan till southern Bihar.

== See also ==
- Sher Shah Suri
- Kabuliwala
