= Bantva Manavadar =

Former princely in India

Coordinates: 21.5°N 70.13°E

Manavadar State Bantva Manavadar
- Princely State
- 1733–1947
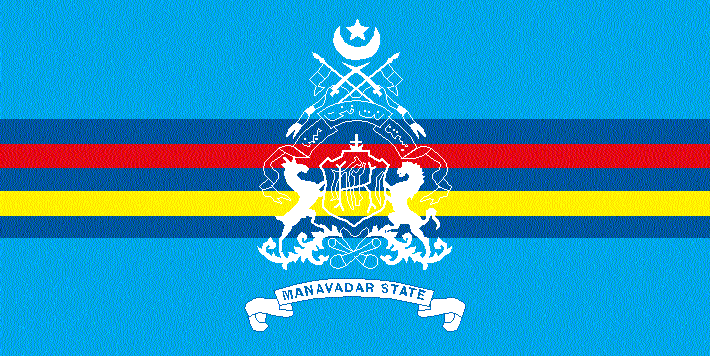
- Flag

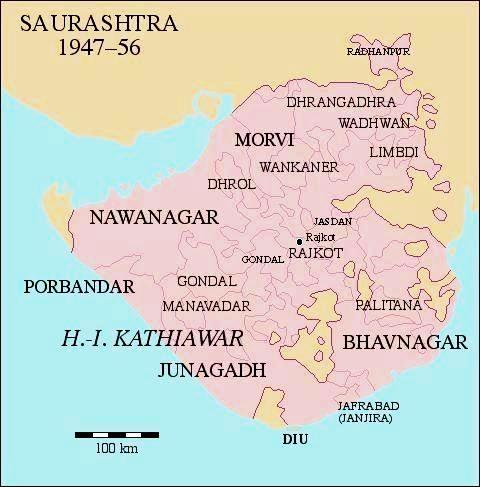
- Location of Manavadar State at the southern end of Saurashtra
- Area
  - 1941: 261.6 km^{2} (101.0 sq mi)
- Population
  - 1941: 26,209
- History
  - Established: 1733
  - Disestablished: 1947
Succeeded by
India

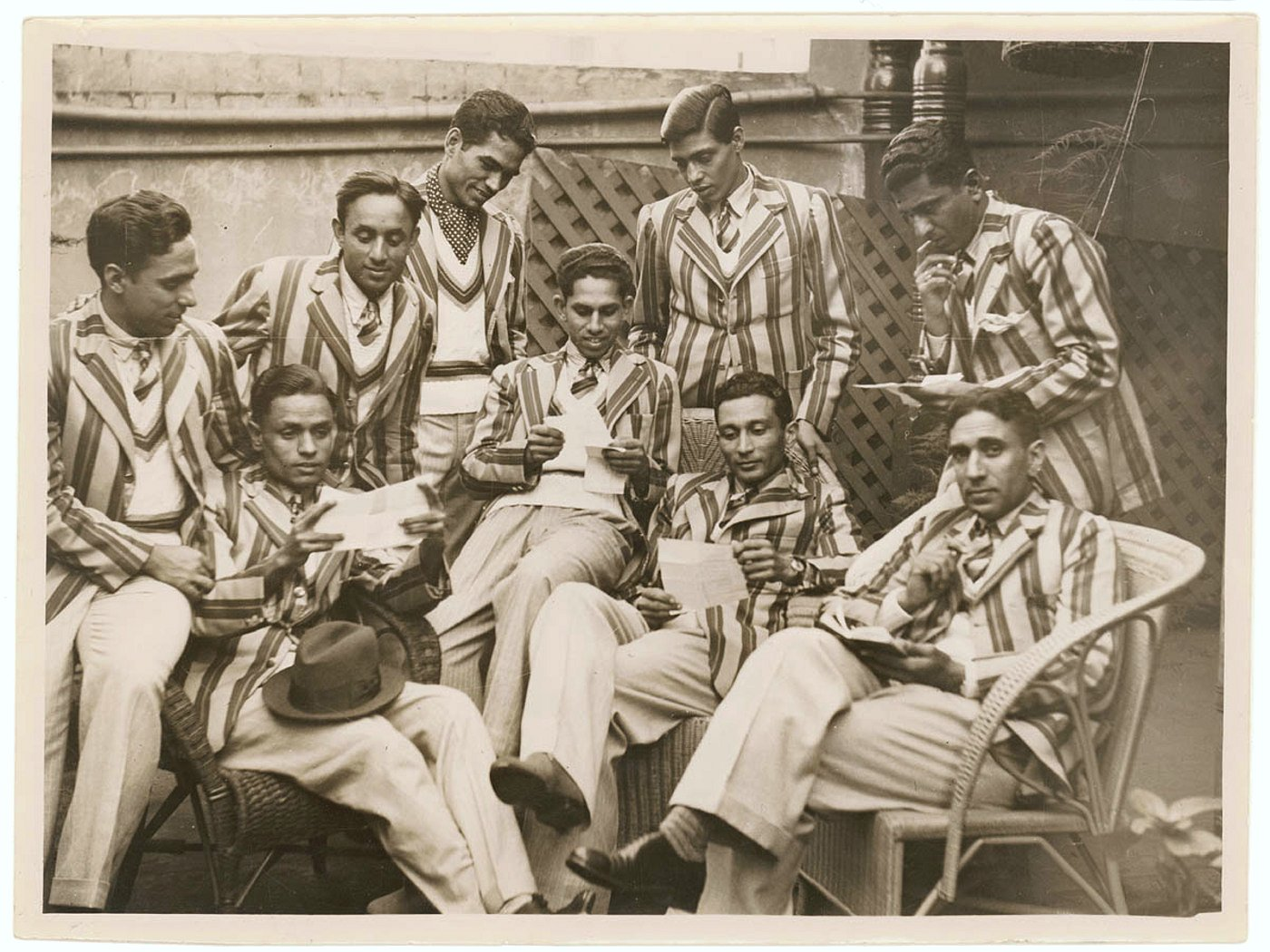
Manavadar State Men's Hockey Team, Sydney, June 1938 – photographer Sam Hood.

Bantva-Manavadar or Manavadar State was a princely state during the era of the British Raj in India. It was located on the Kathiawar peninsula in Gujarat.

The decision in 1947 of the ruling prince, Muhammad Mahabat Khan III, to accede Junagadh and Bantva Manavadar as princely states of Pakistan led to a crisis, as most of his subjects were Hindus. In February 1948 came the Annexation of Junagadh and Bantva Manavadar by India, following a referendum.

== See also ==
- Political integration of India
- Bantva Memons
- Bantva
