= Pathans of Gujarat =

Indian people of Pashtun origin

Pashtun/Pathan or Afghan
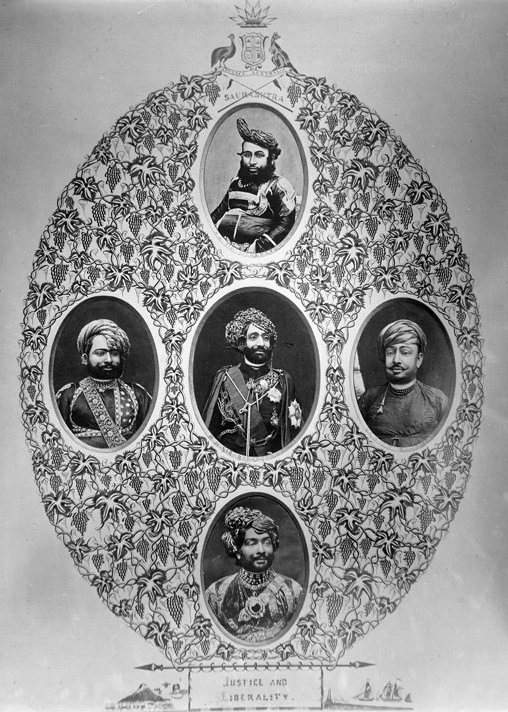
- Junagadh Nawabs and state officials, 19th century

Total population
- Unknown

Regions with significant populations
- India (Gujarat: Ahmedabad, Kheda, Bharuch)

Languages
- Gujarati • Pashto • Hindustani • English

Religion
- Islam

Related ethnic groups
- Pathans • Rohilla • Pathans of Uttar Pradesh • Pathans of Rajasthan • Pathan of Bihar • Pathans of Punjab

Pathans of Gujarat are a group of Pashtuns, who are settled across the region of Gujarat in western India. They now form a distinct community of Hindi speaking Muslims. They mainly speak Hindi with many Pashto loanwords, while a few elders in the community may still speak Pashto. Common tribes include Ghilzai, Babi or Babai (Pashtun tribe), Niazi, Bangash, Durrani, Yousafzai among others.

== History and origin ==
The Pathans arrived in Gujarat in the Middle Ages, as merchants and soldiers in the armies of various rulers of the region. It has been suggested that the earliest settlement of Pashtuns was during the 14th century, when military colonies were established.

== The Babai State ==
The State of Junagadh or Junagarh was a princely state located in Gujarat. It had been ruled by the Muslim Babi dynasty since 1654, first by Nawab of Junagadh within the Maratha Confederacy and later by British India. This princely family was of the Babai Pashtun tribe.

== The 'Kabul-i' ==
The term Kabuli literally means any inhabitant of the city of Kabul in Afghanistan. In Gujarat, the term was applied to any Pashtun who arrived in Gujarat during the 19th Century, the majority of whom were Ghilzais. Historically, the community were traders, buying horses from Kathiawar and selling them in Rajputana and Deccan. Though found across the region but mainly in Ahmedabad, they speak Hindi first as well as Gujarati. Some older members of the community can still speak Pashto. They form quite a distinct community.

== Notable people ==
- Salim Durrani, Afghan born Indian cricketer
- Parveen Babi, Indian Actress and model
- Irfan Pathan, Indian former cricketer turned analyst.
- Yusuf Pathan, Brother of Irfan Pathan and former Indian cricketer.

== See also ==
- Pashtun diaspora
- Rohilla
- Pathans of Uttar Pradesh
- Pathans of Punjab
- Khuda Gawah (Popular depictions of Pashtuns in Indian cinema)
