= Mangrol State =

State in Junagadh district, Gujarat, India

Coordinates: 21°8′N 70°8′E

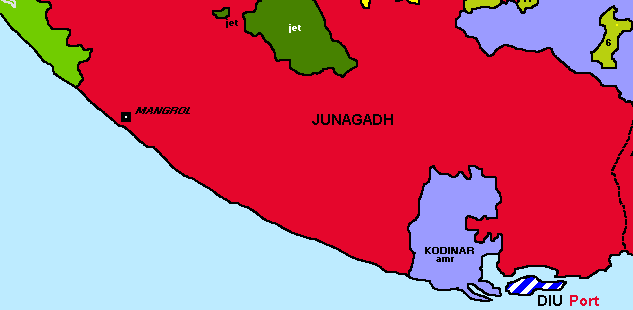
Location of Mangrol State

Mangrol State was a princely state in the Junagadh district of Gujarat, India. It was incorporated into Saurashtra State in 1949 following a referendum which determined to join India rather than Pakistan.
