= Second Rohilla War =

Military campaign in 1794

Second Anglo-Rohilla War
- Part of The Rohilla Wars
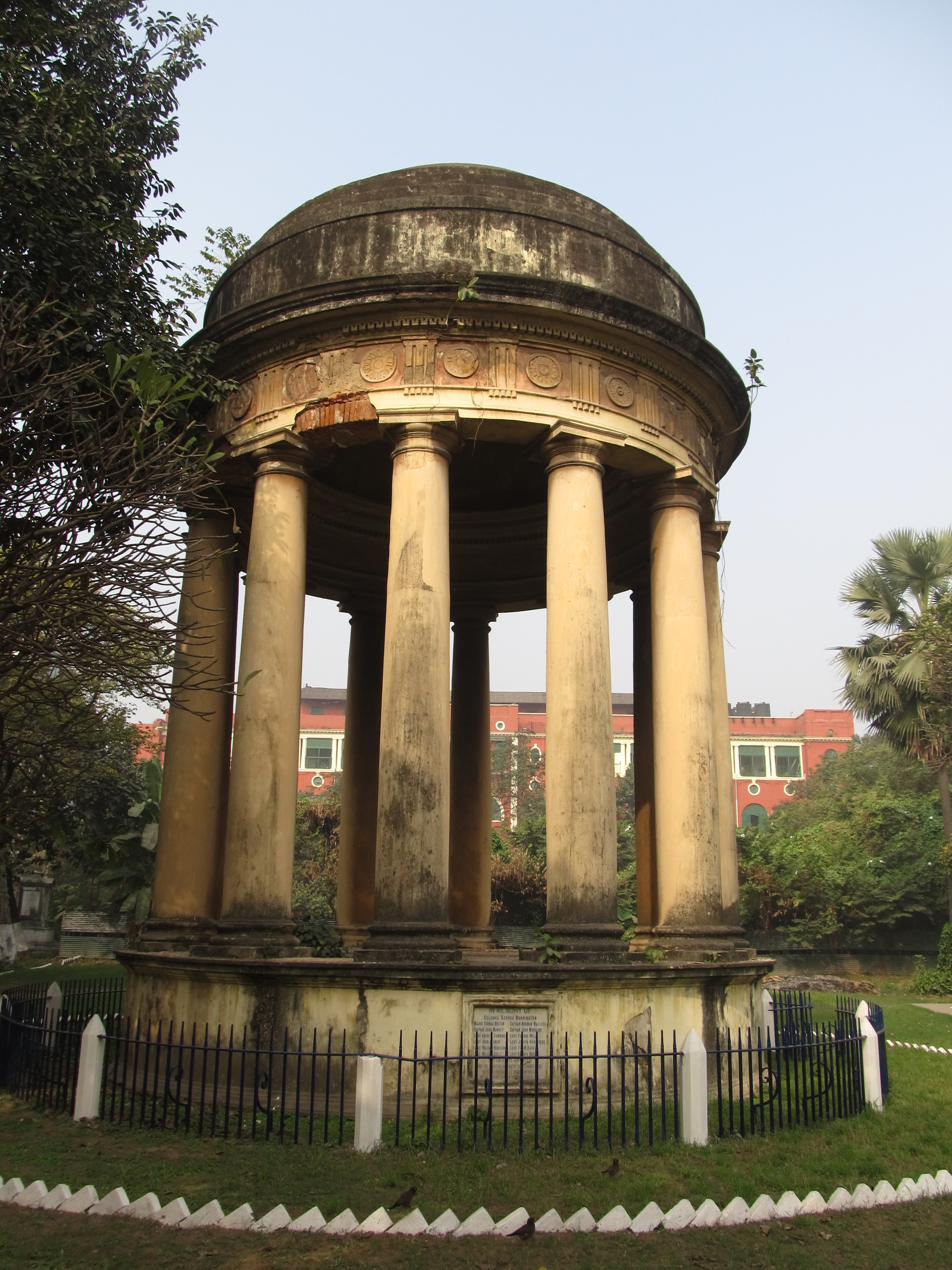
- Cenotaph of the Second Rohilla War at the St. John's Church, Kolkata
Date	1794
Location	North Western India
Result	British-Oudh victory: Ascendancy of Nawab Ahmed Ali Khan to the throne of Rampur; Exile of notables including Nawab Ghulam Muhammad Khan to Benares

Belligerents
Rampur State	Oudh State; Supported By: East India Company

Commanders and leaders
Ghulam Muhammad Khan	Nawab Asaf-ud-Daula (United Kingdom of Great Britain and Ireland) Sir Robert Abercromby

Units involved
Rampur State Foce; Abdullah Khan's Force	Bengal Army

Strength
~25,000 soldiers	90,000

Casualties and losses
All	1,100

The Second Rohilla War was a conflict between the Kingdom of Awadh and East India Company, and the Rohillas of Rampur State in 1794.

== Background ==
The North Western region of India was ruled by both the Kingdom of Rohilkhand and Awadh, the latter ruled through the support of the British. Rohilkhand fell under pillaging of the Maratha's that had largely occurred as Maratha revenge against the Rohilla participation of the Third Battle of Panipat which had inflicted a fatal blow to the Maratha Empire and sent it into a downward spiral leading to its eventual end with the Third Anglo-Maratha War.

Rohilkhand appealed to both Awadh and the British for help which was then guaranteed on the back of a payment, however the Maratha's eventually retreated on their own volition without any interference of Awadh, negating any need for help from Awadh or the British. When Hafiz Rehmat Khan refused Nawab Najib ad Daula advice of paying off the debt owed to Awadh on the grounds that the British had in effect done little to deserve the payment which they now demanded it led to the First Rohilla war which ended in the Annexation of the Kingdom of Rohilkhand. An act that was viewed as illegal by many and which ultimately led to the Impeachment Trial of Warren Hastings. The only such situation where a colonial power impeached its own governor.

The close of the First Rohilla War saw a guerilla campaign in which the Rohilla nation led by the former Nawab of Rohilkhand, Faizullah Khan successfully managed to gain concessions from the British and in 1774 saw Faizullah Khan installed as Nawab of Rampur with the support of the British East India Company. Faizullah Khan was a competent ruler who was succeeded by his son, Muhammad Ali Khan, on his death in 1793.

== Revolution of 1794 ==
In September 1794, a palace coup saw the overbearing and bad-tempered Nawab Muhammad Ali Khan of Rampur deposed by his younger brother, Ghulam Muhammad Khan Bahadur, and exiled to Dungarpur, where he was later shot in his sleep. Ghulam Muhammad was forced by the common people to begin a campaign of liberation of the former territories of Rohilkhand that were now under the Awadh and the British.

== War ==
=== Mobilisation and Planning ===
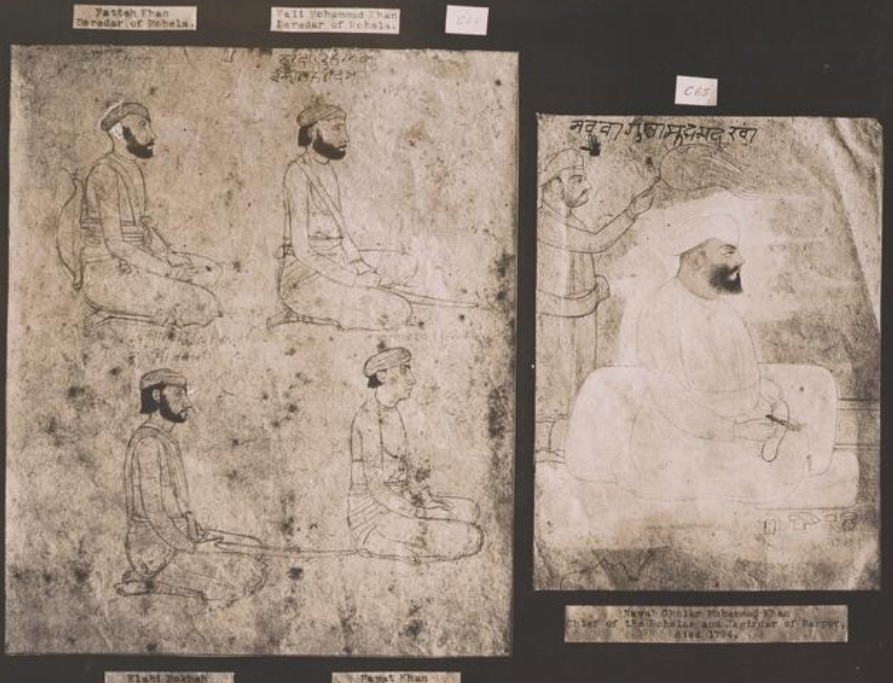
Portrait of a sketch of Ghulam Muhammad Khan, Chief of the Rohillas and some Rohilla officers. Photograph. 1911-12.

Nawab Ghulam Muhammad Khan of Rampur ordered a general mobilisation of troops, with the natives of Rampur or Rohillas in particular responding enthusiastically to the call resulting in almost every family being represented in the army. By the fourth week the army had increased in size to 25,000 leading to high spirits. Although the raw recruits were relatively low in discipline and training. A large part of the army were however composed of Kamalzais, natives of Miranpur Katra in Shahjahanpur since the 1600s and thus being culturally closer to Awadh in sympathy, that had conspired with the Nawab of Awadh in favour of the former Nawab Muhammad Ali Khan's son being appointed against Ghulam Muhammad Khan. They were led by Diler Khan Kamalzai who was not arrested despite Ghulam Muhammad Khan's knowledge of his conflicting loyalties, largely not to incur hostilities from his community.

The Nawab initially ordered the officers to "wait till the other side attacks first", but this defensive policy was ditched at the advice of his officers. There were plan on carrying out raids on Moradabad and Chandusi but it was eventually decided that the best course of action would be to capture the former capital of the Kingdom of Rohilkhand, Bareilly, which now served as the headquarters of Awadh in the Rohilkhand region.

=== Movements ===
On 16 October, forces of Abdullah Khan, son of Ghulam Qadir Khan joined the Rampur forces and by 26 October they reached Mirganj, a location a few Kilometres away from Bareilly. The Nazim of Bareilly was notified of the impending attack by Awadh, and a British Force under Robert Appercromby reached there and waited for re-enforcements. The Nawab of Awadh, who was less willing to see a war through with the Rohilla's stalled and would reach the scene of the engagement a day after the main battle had taken place.

On 25 October, the force of Abercromby, stationed a few miles outside Bareilly, received intel that the Rohilla army was close to the Do Jora river and the very same evening Ghulam Muhammad would order the army to cross the river. A peace settlement was sent by Ghulam Muhammad to Appercromby but the latter refused to discuss any terms unless Ghulam returned to Rampur territory.

=== Battle of Bithaura ===
On 26 October War took place at the village of Bithaura. The rohilla's used cover from the Jungle to launch a confusing attack upon the advancing British columns. The British had hoped to initially begin the war by sending an advanced Cavalry charge and to eventually give way until the Rohilla's should come into range of British guns.

However, the Rohilla Cavalry completely overwhelmed the British Cavalry and the resulting fleeing of the British Cavalry did not leave any space for the use of guns. The Rohilla's completely overwhelmed and smashed through the right wing of the British Infantry.Nawab Ghulam Muhammad Khan began to beat the drums of victory, however General Abercromby held his ground and maintained the centre eventually managing to get another cavalry charge through. The advance guard of Rohilla's, in the joy of their victory, began to decapitate the dead, becoming sitting ducks for British. Eventually, after heavy cannon fire the indiscipline of the Rohilla's overcame them and the army fled.

A large part of the Army in the form of the Kamalzai did not engage in battle, and many Kamalzai soldiers defected over to the British.

=== Opinions on the War ===
Abercromby who had served in the American War of Independence and the Third Anglo-Mysore War, was impressed by the Rohilla's and their bravery on the battle field, he is quoted as having said that:

"More Determined and cool bravery in an enemy I have never experienced"

Abu Talib, who accompanied Asaf ad Daula on the day after the war had been fought said:

"Owing to the inactivity of some English officers and the intrepidity of the Ruhelas (Rohillas), the British were on the point of defeat, but the General, who occupied the centre, notwithstanding the dispersion in the right wing, held his ground and kept up the incessant cannon fires".

Abu Talib believed that if the Rohilla Army had got to Barielly earlier they would have taken the city by surprise and would have been able to use the supplies from the city to muster more troops in the form of mercenary Sikhs along with ammunitions and guns from the stores to put up a farce fight against Awadh.

== Aftermath ==
Ghulam Muhammad's army of approximately 25,000 Rohillas was defeated by the British force at Bhitaura. There are two Monuments of war one each of Rohillas and the British Dead Soldiers plus a lookout tower the British Monument is with a square boundary wall and in middle a Monument with the dates and Names of all interred British soldiers and officers and it sits just right of Highway Between Fatheganj towards Bareilly just before the boundary wall of shutdown Synthetic and Chemicals Rubber Factory .
