= Rohilla dynasty =

Prominent dynasty in North India (1721–1947)

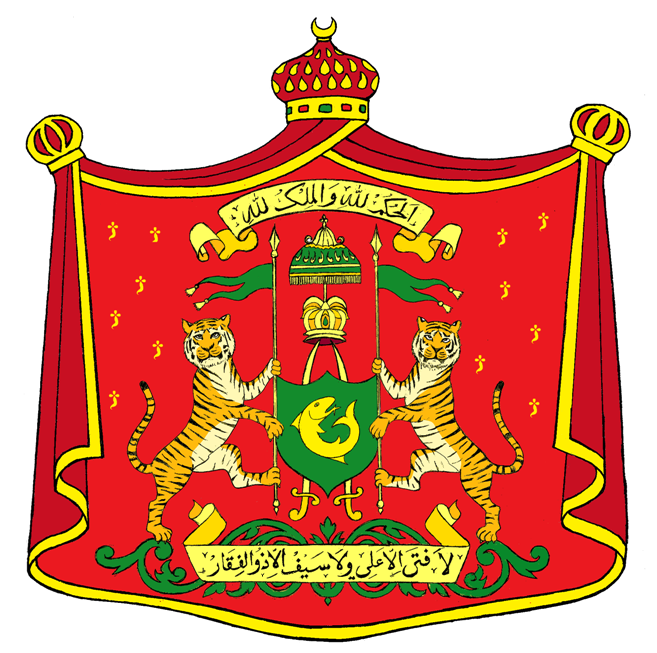
- Country: Kingdom of Rohilkhand; Rampur State
- Founded: 1721
- Founder: Nawab Ali Mohammad Khan Bahadur Rohilla
- Titles: Nawab of Rohilkhand; Nawab of Badaun; Nawab of Moradabad; Nawab of Rampur; Nawab of Aonla; Nawab of Tandah; Nawab of Bareilly; Nawab of Shikohabad; Chief of the Rohilla
- Deposition: 1947 (in Rampur State)
- Cadet branches: House of Badaun; House of Rampur; House of Moradabad; House of Bareilly

The Rohilla dynasty ruled over much of northwestern Uttar Pradesh, initially the Kingdom of Rohilkhand and later the princely state of Rampur, from 1721 to 1947. At the height of their power, the dynasty ruled over Rohilkhand, and launched invasions into the kingdoms of Kumaon and Garhwal.

The Nawabs of Rampur played a vital role in eliminating communal violence during their reign, even as widespread ethnic cleansing of Muslim subjects occurred in the Sikh States, Alwar, and Bharatpur during the Partition riots, which were widely believed to have been ordered by their rulers. In contrast, the Nawab forbade his nobles from carrying out reprisal attacks against non-Muslims.

== Origin ==
The Rohillas were Pashtuns who migrated to northern India in the 17th and 18th centuries. However, the founder of the Rohilla dynasty was Ali Mohammed Khan, originally named Prem Singh Nain, a Jat boy who was adopted and converted to Islam by Daud Khan Barech. Due to Ali's pivotal role in the establishment of the Kingdom of Rohilkhand, he gained full recognition as a Rohilla chief, despite not being Pashtun by birth.

Ali's son, Faizullah Khan, continued the line as the Nawab of Rampur. In the 19th century, the Nawabs began using the title of Sayyid, claiming descent from the Barha Sayyids. They hired a prominent maulvi, Najmul Ghani, to construct a genealogy tracing their lineage back to Ali ibn Abi Talib. However, they failed to produce any reliable pedigree or evidence to support these claims.

== History ==
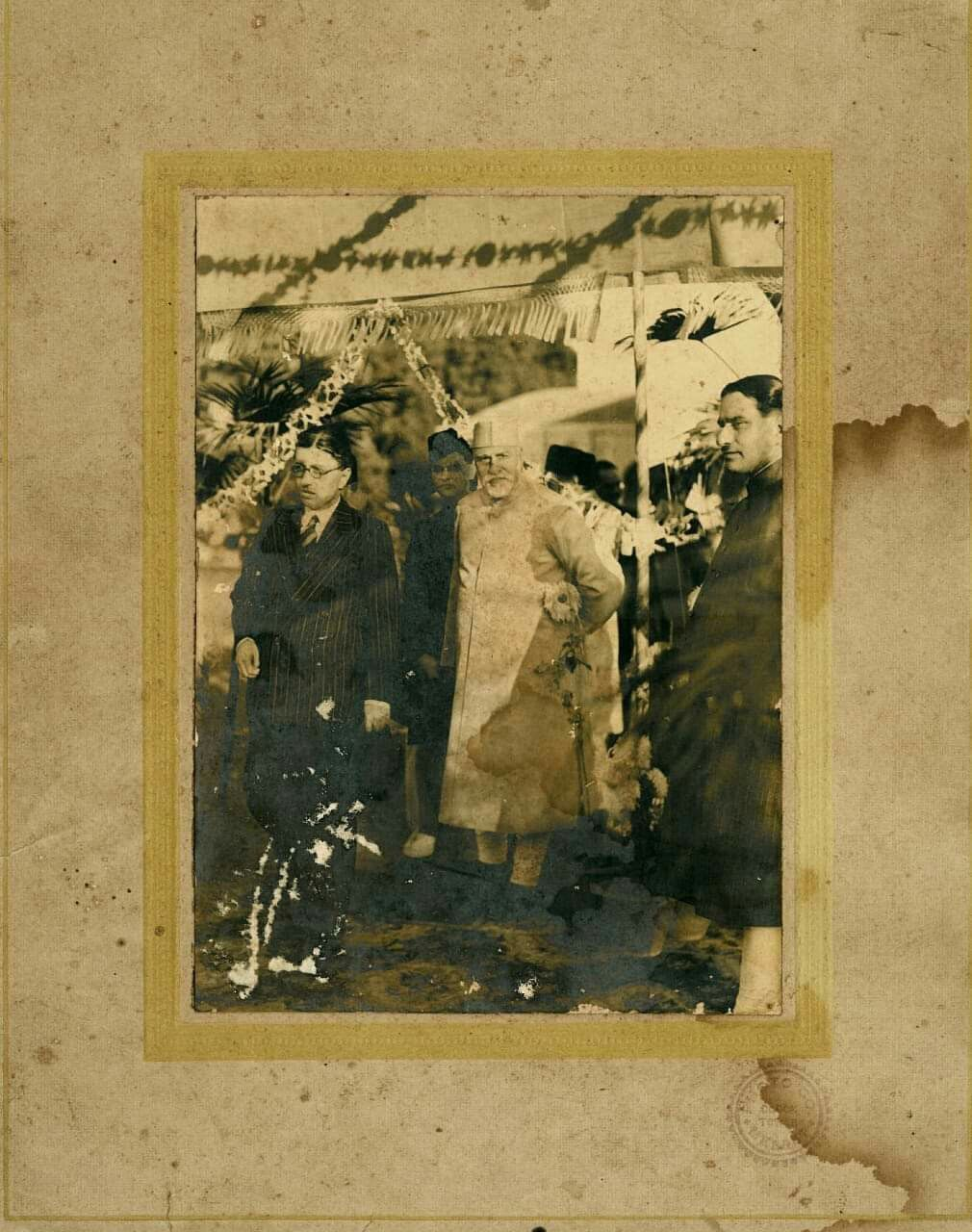
Nawab Muhammad Raza 'Ali Khan of Rampur with Khan Bahadur Abdullah Khan of Jansath and Mumtaz Ali Khan

The dynasty rose to prominence with the first Nawab of Rohilkhand, Ali Mohammad Khan.

=== Formation ===
Ali Mohammed Khan attracted many Afghan adventurers by virtue of his great reputation and became the most powerful man in Katehir. Conscious of his own power and the failing state of the Mughal Empire, he neglected imperial mandates and irregularly paid tax to the central government. Using the income from his lands to raise troops, purchase artillery and military stores and curry favour with political persons of interest, he used the same tactic to gain favour with the lower rungs of society. By his invasion of Nadir Shah in 1739 he strengthened his position, with many Afghans joining him. By 1740 he was officially recognised by the emperor Muhammad Shah as governor. For the subsequent five years, his authority was unchallenged.

In 1745 a quarrel arose between Ali Mohammed and Safdar Jang, the subahdar of Oudh. Ali's retainers seized the property of servants belonging to Safdar. Safdar was already jealous at Ali's growing power. He went to Emperor Muhammad Shah, and through him ordered the return of the confiscated property as well as the arrest of the Rohillas in charge of the confiscation. After Ali's refusal, Safdar led an imperial expedition together with the emperor. Ali's men deserted and he was captured and taken to Delhi.

He was treated respectfully by the emperor, in large part due to his influence among his many adherents. Ali was propitiated by an appointment as Governor of Sirhind (the area between Jummuna and Sutlej).

In 1748 an invasion by Ahmed Shah Abdali allowed Ali the opportunity to return to Katehir and re-establish his rule. Upon his return, he was rejoined by most of his men and became virtually independent in his control of Rohilkhand. To ensure loyalty almost all positions of power were given to Afghan and several including Najib ad-Dawlah received land grants.

=== Second generation ===
On his deathbed, Ali Mohammad anointed his foster uncle Rehmat Khan as "Hafiz" (protector) of Rohilkhand and Dundi Khan as Chief of Army. He had already planned the division of his realm among his sons and received Rehmat Khan and Dundi Khan's solemn oaths that they would execute his will and protect the interests of his children. A council was created of the Rohilla chiefs in part to keep a check on Rehmat Khan and Dundi Khan and to provide a government that would safeguard Rohilkhand from invasion. All carried out solemn promises to carry out their duty, but they all reneged and sought to establish their own autonomy. This led to a confederation-like structure of government with the nawab of Rohilkhand at its head and the Rohilla chiefs in charge of individual Rohilla states answering to him, especially in regards to military engagements.

Ali's realm was divided in such a way so as to create discord. Nawab Abdullah Khan and Nawab Murtaza Khan were given shared rule over Badaun. Nawab Alah Yar Khan and Nawab Saadullah Khan were given shared rule over Moradabad, Nawab Faizullah Khan was given rule over Rampur and Nawab Muhammad Yar Khan was given rule over Barielly. In 1754 Hafiz Rehmat Khan orchestrated an argument within the royal family and used it as a pretext to usurp the power and wealth of the orphans. Disgusted, Muhammad Yar Khan along with his older brother Abdullah Khan and younger brother Allah Yar Khan left for Oojanee. Nawab Alah Yar Khan died of consumption, and Nawab Murtaza Khan left for Secunderabad, where he died. Nawab Saadullah Khan was appointed nawab of Rohilkhand. Later, Nawab Abdullah Khan and Nawab Muhammad Yar Khan were granted land again. Nawab Muhammad Yar Khan was given rule over Aonla, and his court at Tandah was famed for poets such as Qaim and Mushafi.

== Relations with the British ==
The dynasty was highly regarded by the British for their "determined bravery". The Rohilla Wars were the most costly for the British against any Indian kingdom. The ensuing guerrilla war forced the British to grant the Rohillas a princely state wheresoever they willed, leading to the creation of Rampur. Their bravery, tolerance and progressive rule gained them admiration. They were called upon by the British for aid in the Anglo-French Wars. Burke described the Rohillas as "the bravest, the most honourable and generous" and the Nawab of Rampur became the first Indian sovereign to meet Queen Victoria along with several other European monarchs.

=== Dynastic relations ===
In the 19th century, descendants of Ali Mohammed Khan, specifically the Nawabs of Rampur, made disputed claims that he was a Barha Sayyid, the influential dynasty best known as de facto ruling Mughal Empire during the early 18th century, and began the usage the title of Sayyid. However, they could not present any pedigree or valid historical proof in the support of this claim. The Nawabs even sought service of a prominent religious leader of Rampur, Najmul Ghani for establishing ancestry from Ali, which was widely rejected.

== List of rulers ==
=== Kingdom of Rohilkhand ===
Nawab	Relation with previous Nawab	Rule
Formation of Kingdom of Rohilkhand
Nawab Ali Mohammed Khan	Founder	1721–1748
Nawab Abdullah Khan	Son	1748–1754
Nawab Saadullah Khan	Brother	1754–1764
Nawab Faizullah Khan	Brother	1764–1774
Conquest by Oudh. Green row signifies the regency of Hafiz Rahmat Ali Khan.

=== Rampur State ===
Nawab	Reign began	Reign ended
Formation of Rampur State after the First Rohilla War
Faizullah Khan	15 September 1774	24 July 1793
Muhammad Ali Khan Bahadur	24 July 1793	11 August 1793
Ghulam Muhammad Khan Bahadur	11 August 1793	24 October 1794
Ahmad Ali Khan Bahadur	24 October 1794	5 July 1840
Nasrullah Khan – Regent	24 October 1794	1811
Muhammad Said Khan Bahadur	5 July 1840	1 April 1855
Yusef Ali Khan Bahadur	1 April 1855	21 April 1865
Kalb Ali Khan Bahadur	21 April 1865	23 March 1887
Muhammad Mushtaq Ali Khan Bahadur	23 March 1887	25 February 1889
Hamid Ali Khan Bahadur	25 February 1889	20 June 1930
Regency	25 February 1889	4 April 1894
Raza Ali Khan Bahadur	20 June 1930	6 March 1966
Murtaza Ali Khan Bahadur – Titular	6 March 1966	8 February 1982
Independence and accession to Indian Union

== See also ==
- Jat Muslim
- Pashtunization
