= Rohilkhand =

Region in Uttar Pradesh, India

- Region
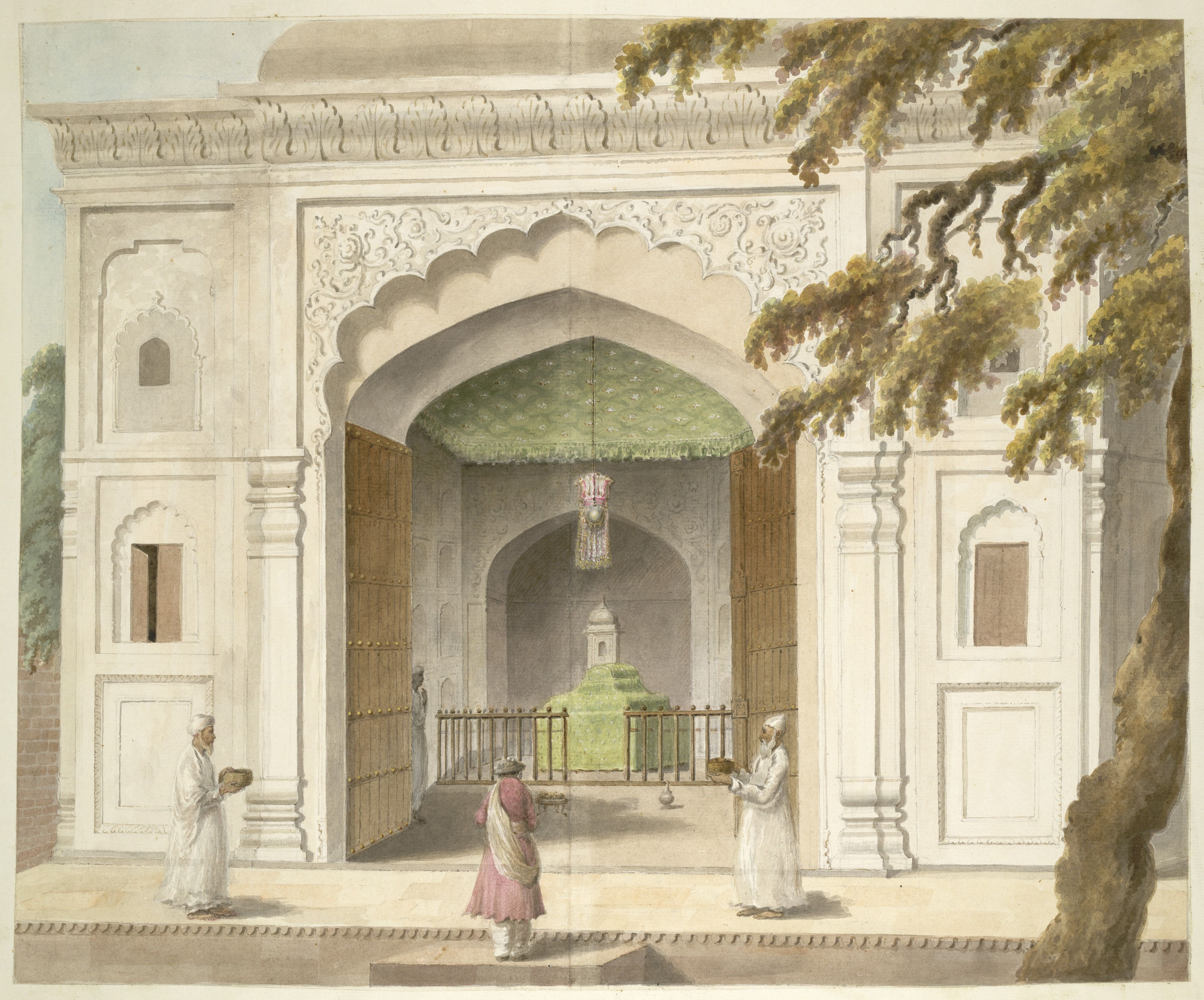
- An old Painting of the dargah of ruler of Rohilkhand, Sardar Hafiz Rahmat Khan
- Interactive map of Rohilkhand
- Country: India
- State: Uttar Pradesh
- Established: 1690 CE

Historical
  - Dynasties: Panchala (Mahabharata era); Mughals (1526–1736); Rohillas (1736–1858)
  - Historic capitals: Aonla, Bareilly and Rampur

Overview
  - Languages: Kauravi dialect of Hindi, Standard Hindi, Standard Urdu
  - Separated subahs: Bareilly, Bijnor, Budaun, Moradabad, Pilibhit, Rampur and Shahjahanpur
  - Covering Territory: Bareilly division and Moradabad division

Rohilkhand (Hindi pronunciation: [ɾoːɦɪlkʰəɳɖ]) is a region in the northwestern part of Uttar Pradesh, India, that is centered on the Bareilly and Moradabad divisions. It is part of the upper Ganges Plain, and is named after the Rohilla, a community of Pashtun heritage. The region was called Madhyadesh and Panchala in the Sanskrit epics Mahabharata and Ramayana. During the colonial era, parts of the region were governed by the Rohilla dynasty.

== Etymology ==
Rohilkhand means "the land of the Rohilla". The term Rohilla first became common in the 17th century, with Rohilla used to refer to the people coming from the land of Roh, which in turns comes from Sanskrit Rohitagiri, literally 'red hills'; Roh was originally a geographical term that corresponded with the territory from Swat and Bajaur in the north to Sibi in the south, and from Hasan Abdal (Attock) in the east to Kabul and Kandahar in the west, and was used for the mountainous region since at least the times of Pāṇini, according to whom highlanders were settled in the region.

== History ==
The Rohilla Afghan leader Daud Khan led the settlement in the Katehar region in northern India under orders of the Mughal emperor Aurangzeb (ruled 1658–1707) to suppress the Katheria Rajput uprisings. The Rajputs' first king was Raja Ram Singh Katheria. These katheriya Rajputs contained 18 clans of Rajput Vansh, including the Chauhan, Rathore, Gehlot, Sisodia, Nikumbh, and Pundir. Originally, some 20,000 soldiers from various Pashtun tribes (Yusafzai, Ghori, Osmani, Ghilzai, Barech, Marwat, Tareen, Kakar, Naghar, Afridi and Khattak) were hired as soldiers by the Mughals. Aurangzeb was impressed with their performance and an additional force of 25,000 Pashtuns was recruited from modern Khyber Pakhtunkhwa and Afghanistan and were given respected positions in the Mogul Army. Most Pashtuns settled in the Katehar region and brought their families from Khyber Pakhtunkhwa and Afghanistan. During Nadir Shah's invasion of northern India in 1739, led by the general Ahmed Shah Abdali, a new wave of Pashtuns increased the population to over 1,000,000. Due to the large settlement of Rohilla Afghans, the Katehar region became known as Rohilkhand. Bareilly was made the capital of the Rohilkhand state and it became Pashtun majority city with Gali Nawaban as the main royal street. Other important cities were Moradabad, Rampur, Shahjahanpur, and Badaun.

In 1752, the Maratha were asked by Safdar Jang, the Nawab of Oudh, to help him defeat Pashtun Rohilla. The Maratha forces and Awadh forces besieged the Rohillas, who had sought refuge in Kumaon, but had to retreat when Ahmad Shah Abdali invaded India.

After the Third Battle of Panipat, thousands of Pashtun and Baloch soldiers settled in northern India. These diverse ethnic, cultural, and linguistic groups merged over time to form the Urdu-speaking Muslims of South Asia.

During the Capture of Delhi, Marathas defeated Rohilla chieftain Zabita Khan. After taking control of Delhi, the Marathas sent a large army in 1772 to punish Afghan Rohillas for their involvement in Panipat. They desecrated the grave of Rohilla chieftain Najib ad-Dawla and captured Najibabad. With the fleeing of the Rohillas, the rest of the country was burnt, with the exception of the city of Amroha, which was defended by some thousands of Amrohi Sayyid tribes. The Rohillas who could offer no resistance fled to the Terai region. Though the Marathas left Rohilkhand hastily due to the arrival of the monsoon, which was difficult for their armies, their threat forced the Rohillas to seek an alliance with the Nawabs of Awadh.

In the presence of Robert Barker, the commander of the British East India company troops at Awadh, a treaty was signed between Nawab Shuja-ud-Daula and Hafiz Rahmat Khan on 15 June 1772, which ensured the safety of Rohilkhand by Awadh and its British allies from the Marathas in exchange for Rs 40 lakh. The families of the Rohilla chiefs imprisoned by the Marathas were also released, through the intervention of the Nawab.

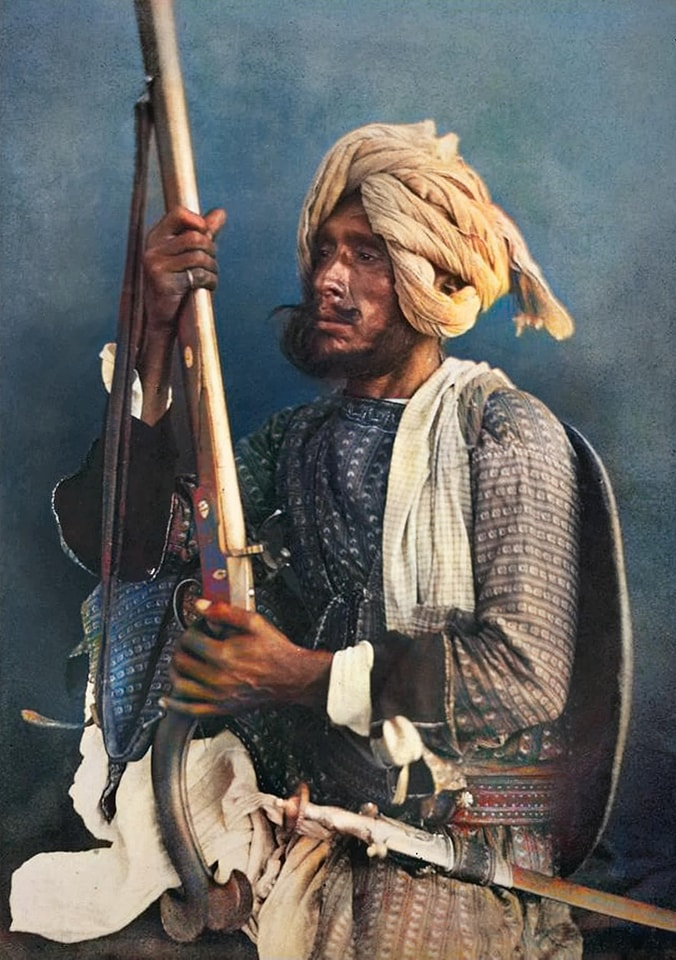
Portrait of a Rohilla warrior

In 1773, the Marathas once again crossed the Ganges at Ramghat in Badaun, and advanced towards Rohilkhand. The Nawab of Awadh with his British allies came to the aid of the Rohillas and the Marathas were forced to retreat. The Nawab of Awadh now demanded the payment that had been promised for his help. But Hafiz Rahmat Khan refused by sending letters to the Nawab and the British, pleading his inability to pay due to internal strife and discontent among his dependent chiefs.

This led to the First Rohilla War. Nawab Shuja-ud-Daula's troops, supported by British troops, invaded Rohilkhand. Hafiz Rahmat Khan was killed in the ensuing Battle of Miranpur Katra in 1774.

Rohilkhand fell to Awadh, and was plundered and occupied. The majority of the Rohillas left. They fled across the Ganges in numbers, to start a guerrilla war; or emigrated. A Rohilla state under British protection was set up in Rampur. Faizullah Khan managed to become the nawab of the newly created Rampur State.

The whole of Rohilkhand (including Pilibhit and Shahjanpur) was surrendered by Saadat Ali Khan II to the East India Company by the treaty of 10 November 1801.

== Rulers ==
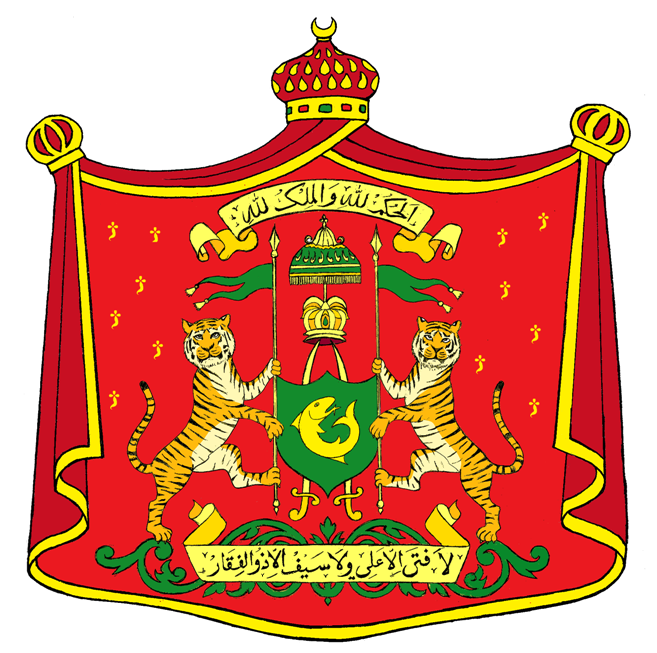
The Coat of Arms of the Rohilla dynasty (1721–1982)

Name	Reign began	Reign ended
Ali Mohammed Khan	1721	15 September 1748
Hafiz Rahmat Khan (regent)	15 September 1748	23 April 1774
Faizullah Khan	1774	24 July 1793
Muhammad Ali Khan Bahadur	24 July 1793	11 August 1793
Ghulam Muhammad Khan Bahadur	11 August 1793	24 October 1794
Ahmad Ali Khan Bahadur	24 October 1794	5 July 1840
Nasrullah Khan (regent)	24 October 1794	1811
Muhammad Said Khan Bahadur	5 July 1840	1 April 1855
Yusef Ali Khan Bahadur	1 April 1855	21 April 1865
Kalb Ali Khan Bahadur	21 April 1865	23 March 1887
Muhammad Mushtaq Ali Khan Bahadur	23 March 1887	25 February 1889
Hamid Ali Khan Bahadur	25 February 1889	20 June 1930
Muhammad Said Khan Bahadur	5 July 1840	1 April 1855
Raza Ali Khan Bahadur	20 June 1930	6 March 1966
Murtaza Ali Khan Bahadur (Note: Nawabat abolished in 1971)	6 March 1966	8 February 1982

== See also ==
- Jewan
- Khutar
- Pawayan
