= Gali Nawaban =

Street in India

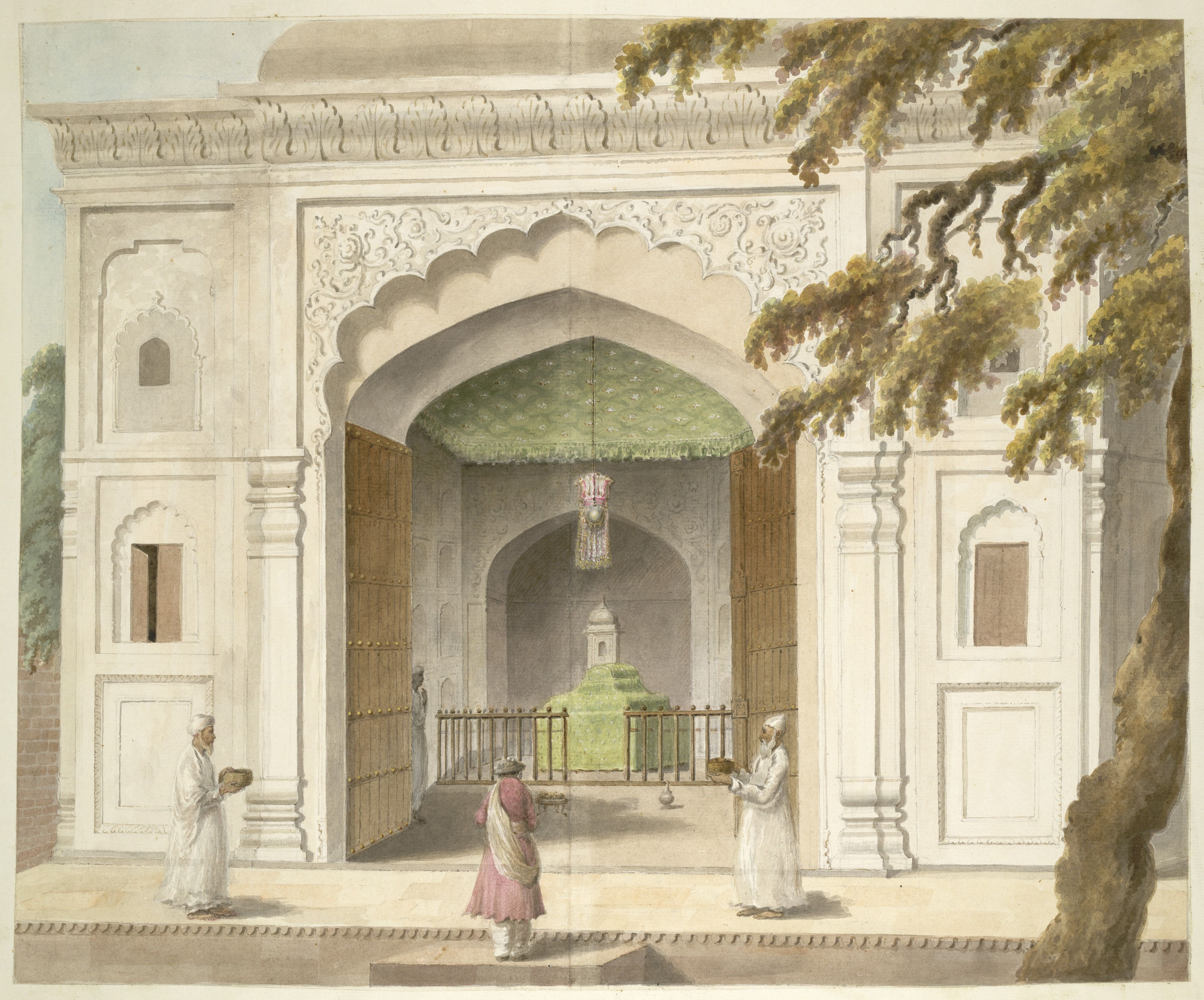
Dargah of Hafiz Rahmat Khan near Gali Nawaban

Gali Nawaban (Royal Lane) is a street in Bareilly, Uttar Pradesh, India. It was the royal lane where members of the Rohilla royalty and nobility lived during the Rohilkhand empire. The palatial houses were subdivided into smaller houses over the years. Most of the Rohillas lived on Gali Nawaban at the independence of Pakistan when some migrated to Pakistan. Gali Nawaban is still inhabited by many Rohilla families and also members of other communities.

== Rohillas ==
Rohilkhand was ruled by Rohillas with their capital in city of Bareilly until their defeat in Rohilla War of 1774–75. Rohillas took active part during the Indian Rebellion of 1857. The rebellion began as a mutiny of native soldiers (sepoys) employed by the British East India Company's army against race- and religion-based injustices and inequities, on 10 May 1857. After the failure of rebellion many Rohillas were lost their lands and some were exiled. When the rebellion failed, Bareilly was subjugated. Khan Bahadur Khan was sentenced to death and hanged in the Kotwali on 24 February 1860. Many urban cities in Uttar Pradesh were experiencing economic stagnation and poverty. After the failure of the Indian Rebellion of 1857 many Rohilla Muslim Pathans from Bareilly and surrounding cities migrated to Dutch South American Colonies, now Suriname and Guyana, as indentured labour. While a majority of Rohillas remained landowners and cultivators, a significant minority were also taking to western education, and entering profession such as the law and medicine. They also began to take an interest in the political debates of the last decade of the 19th Century, with some joining the newly formed Indian National Congress, while others were being attracted to pan-Islamism. This period also saw a wholesale adoption of North Indian Muslim culture, with Urdu becoming the native language of the Rohilla. In fact the term of Rohilla was being replaced with the term Pathan, which was the new self-identification. But a sense of distinct identity remained strong, with the Rohillas occupying distinct quarters in the cities, such as Gali Nawaban (home to the descendants of Hafiz Rahmat Khan), Kakar Tola and Pani Tola, in Bareilly. The intermarriage with neighbouring Muslim communities such as the Shaikh, Muslim Rajput and Kamboh started after the failure of the Indian Rebellion of 1857. At the dawn of independence, the Rohilla were still a distinct community, but all that was about to be changed by the independence of Pakistan and India. The Rohillas are now part of Urdu speaking community of North India and Pakistan.

== See also ==
- Rohilla
- Rohilkhand
- Pathans
- Bareilly
- Rampur
