= Sir Robert Barker, 1st Baronet =

Sir Robert Barker, Bt
- Born: 1732
- Died: 14 September 1789 (aged 56–57)
- Military career
- Allegiance: Kingdom of Great Britain
- Branch: British Army
- Rank: Brigadier-General
- Commands: British Indian Army
- Conflicts: Seven Years' War

Brigadier-General Sir Robert Barker, 1st Baronet, FRS (1732 – 14 September 1789) was a British Army officer who served in the Seven Years' War and politician who sat in the House of Commons from 1774 to 1780. He served as Commander-in-Chief, India between 1770 and 1773.

== Military career ==
Barker was the eldest son of Robert Barker M.D., of Hammersmith, and his wife Hannah Whitehead. He went to India in 1749 and in 1757, during the Seven Years' War, commanded the artillery at the Capture of Chandannagar and at the Battle of Plassey. In 1762 he went on an expedition to Manila in the Philippines. He was knighted on 16 January 1764.

Two years later he returned to India to protect the Nawab wazir of Oudh Shuja-ud-Daula. In 1769 he became Commander-in-Chief, India he became likewise provincial commander-in-chief in Bengal to the great disgust of Sir Richard Fletcher.

However he exceeded his authority by committing the East India Company to guaranteeing a treaty and by confronting a possible Maratha Empire invasion. He resigned in 1773: Colonel Champion, who succeeded him, had to conduct the first Rohilla war.

Barker returned to England becoming member of parliament for Wallingford in 1774. He was elected a Fellow of the Royal Society in 1775. In 1781 he was created a baronet, of Bushbridge in the County of Surrey. Barker's ability as an officer won him the friendship and esteem of Clive.

Escutcheon of the Barker baronets of Bushbridge

== Family ==
In 1780 he married Anne Hallows: they had no children. They lived at Bushbridge near Godalming in Surrey.

== Works ==
Besides the Thermometrical Observations published by the Royal Society, Barker also contributed Observations on a Voyage from Madras to England, 1774, and The Process of Making Ice in the East Indies to volume lxv., and an Account of an Observatory of the Brahmins at Benares to volume lxvii. of the Philosophical Transactions.

Military offices
| Preceded by Richard Smith | Commander-in-Chief, India; 1770–1773 | Succeeded by Charles Chapman |
Parliament of Great Britain
| Preceded by Sir John Aubrey, Bt; John Cator | Member of Parliament for Wallingford; 1774–1780; With: John Cator | Succeeded by Sir John Aubrey, Bt; Chaloner Arcedeckne |
Baronetage of Great Britain
| New creation | Baronet (of Bushbridge); 1781–1789 | Extinct |
| Preceded by Farmer baronets | Barker baronets of Bushbridge; 24 March 1781 | Succeeded by Banks baronets |
