= Roh (historical region) =

Historical region in Pakistan and Afghanistan

Roh was a historical region spanning present-day Pakistan and Afghanistan, and the original homeland of the Rohilla community. The name is derived from Sanskrit Rohitagiri, literally 'red hills', and was used for the mountainous region since at least the times of Pāṇini, according to whom highlanders were settled in the region.

The name Rohilkhand, a historian region in India, is derived from this community. Several dynasties of India, including the Lodi dynasty, Sur dynasty and Karrani dynasty, traced their origins back to Roh.
