= Alexander Champion (East India Company officer) =

British East India Company general

- Died: 15 March 1793
- Military career
- Allegiance: Kingdom of Great Britain
- Branch: British Army
- Rank: Brigadier General
- Commands: Indian Army
- Conflicts: Rohilla War

Brigadier-General Alexander Champion (died 15 March 1793) was Commander-in-Chief, India.

== Military career ==
Champion was commissioned into service for the British East India Company in 1768. He rose through the ranks and was appointed Commander-in-Chief, India in January 1774. On 23 April 1774 Champion defeated the Rohillas (Afghan Highlanders) at Miranpur Katra, killing their leader, Hafiz Rahmat Khan, and ending the Rohilla War.

Champion remained in office until November 1774. He retired to Hatchlands Park near Guildford and died at Bath on 15 March 1793: there is a monument to him in Bath Abbey by Nollekens, which says, 'he rose, in the course of twenty years' active service in India, to the chief command of the company's troops in Bengal.'

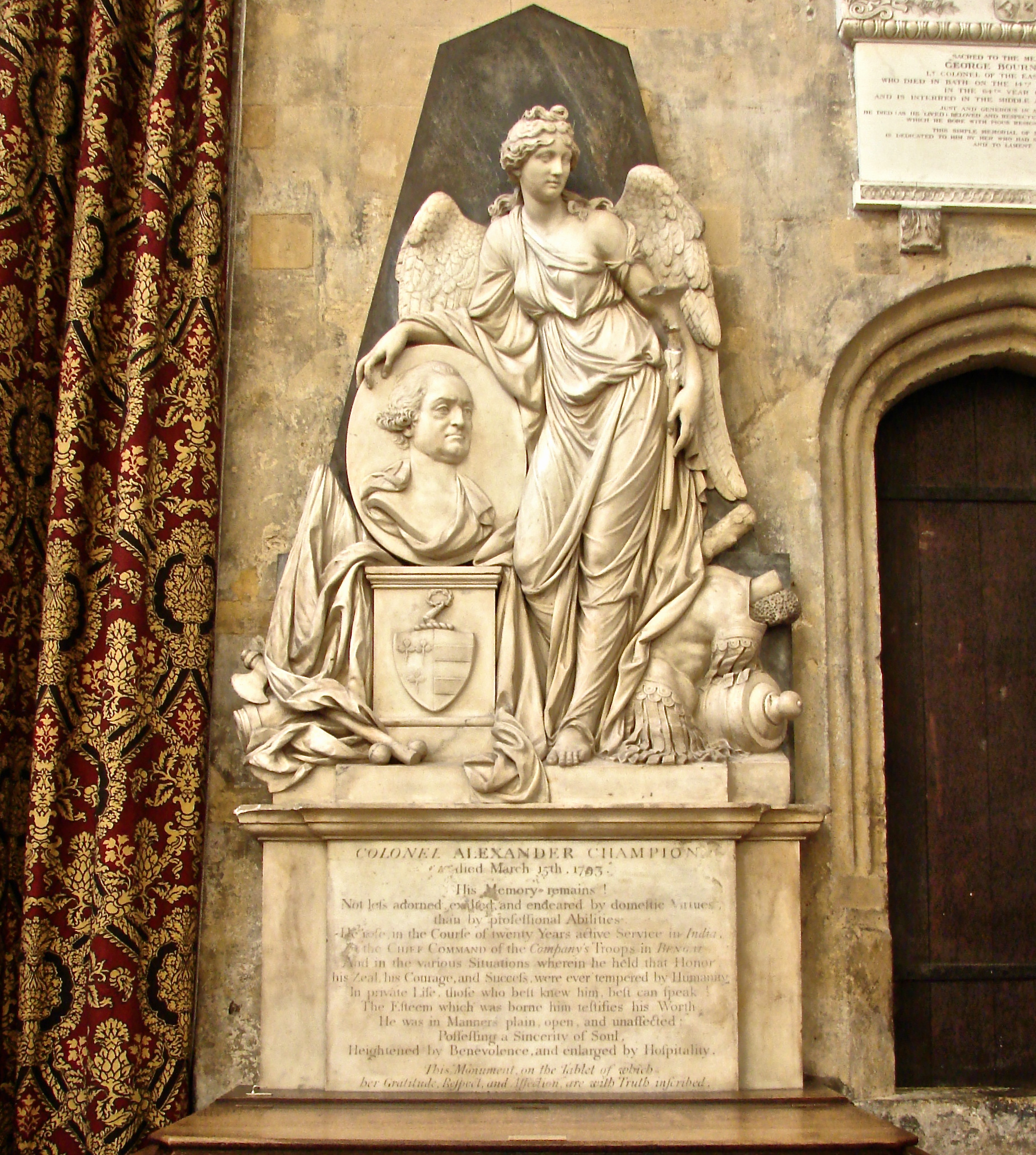
Memorial to Alexander Champion

== Family ==
On 11 February 1759 Champion married Miss Francis Nynd. Whilst in India he lived with Johanna Barr of Calcutta and left her a house and goods in trust for her natural children Ganny Cummings and Alexander Champion.

Military offices
Preceded by Charles Chapman	Commander-in-Chief, India; 1774	Succeeded by Sir John Clavering
