= First Rohilla War =

Military campaign in 1773–1774

The First Rohilla War
- Part of Rohilla Wars
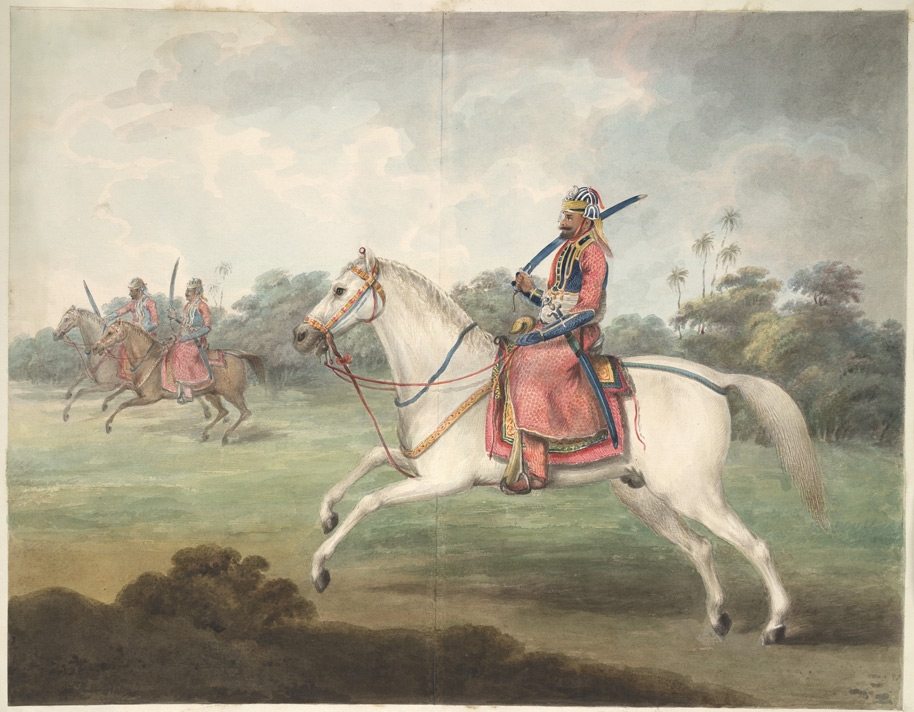
- Rohilla cavalry
Date	1773–1774
Location	Rohilkhand
Result	Anglo-Oudh victory Treaty of Lal Dang
Territorial changes	Annexation of the Kingdom of Rohilkhand and the creation of the Rampur princely state.

Belligerents
Kingdom of Rohilkhand	Oudh State; East India Company

Commanders and leaders
Faizullah Khan; Hafiz Barech †; Muhammad Khan †	Shuja-ud-Daula; Warren Hastings; Alexander Champion

Strength
Unknown	Unknown

Casualties and losses
Unknown	Unknown

The First Rohilla War of 1773–1774 was a punitive campaign by Shuja-ud-Daula, Nawab of Awadh on the behalf of Mughal Emperor, against the Rohillas, Indian descendants of Afghan highlanders settled in Rohilkhand, northern India. The Nawab was supported by troops of the British East India Company, in a successful campaign brought about by the Rohillas reneging on a debt to the Nawab.

== Background ==
Having been driven into the mountains by the Marathas, a few years earlier, the Rohillas had appealed for aid to Shuja-ud-Daulah, at that time an ally of the British. The Nawab demanded in return 40 rods of gold, that Rohilla chiefs refused to pay. The Nawab then decided to annex their country, and appealed to Warren Hastings for assistance, which was given in return for a sum of forty lakhs of rupees.

Hastings justified his action on the ground that the Rohillas were a danger to the British as uncovering the flank of Awadh.

== Course of the war ==
The Rohillas under Hafiz Rahmat Ali Khan were defeated by Colonel Alexander Champion on 23 April 1774 at the Battle of Miranpur Katra. The decisive battle, in which Hafiz Rahmat Khan died, caused the Rohillas to flee to the mountains near Loll Dong.

== Guerrilla War and Siege ==
By October 1774, the war evolved into a war of attrition. Faizullah Khan with the remaining loyal Rohillas retreated to a forest located in the hills of Lal Dang. The combined forces of the British and Awadh laid siege to the area from late August 1774 to October of the same year. Both sides were worn down and wished for peace.

Shuja-ud-Daulah, who was suffering from cancer in his leg, wanted an early peace and thus after several attempts to break Rohilla unity under Faizullah Khan, he finally decided to release Mohabbat Khan, son of the late Hafiz Rehmat Khan in an attempt to undermine Faizullah's authority while at the same time he kept communication with Faizullah. His strategy worked and on 7 October 1774 Faizullah signed an amicable treaty of Lal Dang and was granted a princely state in the area of his choosing, leading to the creation of Rampur State.

== Consequences ==
Rohilkhand fell to Awadh, and was plundered and occupied. The majority of the Rohillas left. They fled across the Ganges in numbers, to start a guerrilla war; or emigrated. A Rohilla state under British protection was set up in Rampur. Faizullah Khan managed to become the nawab of the newly created Rampur State. After his death, his son Muhammad Ali Khan succeeded him, who was deposed by his younger brother and second son of Faizullah Khan, Ghulam Muhammad Khan Bahadur.The aspirations of Afghan Rohillas under him led him to participate in the Second Rohilla War, in 1794. The primary intention of this war was to regain the erstwhile territories of the Rohillas.

However, Ghulam Muhammad's accession to the throne by leading a conspiracy against his brother was not liked by Britishers, who derecognised him as ruler of the Rampur state. Large number of Afghans then flocked to join him against the British but ultimately he was defeated and the state which was now considerably reduced in size was handed over to the infant son of Muhammad Ali Khan.

== Warren Hastings ==
The war became a matter of Westminster politics during the Impeachment of Warren Hastings. Charges of destroying a nation were brought against Hastings by Edmund Burke and later Thomas Macaulay.

== See also ==
- Second Rohilla War
