= Faizullah Khan =

Faizullah Ali Khan
- Nawab of Rampur; Nawab of Shikohbad; Sardar of the Barech tribe Chief of The Rohilla; Mustaid Jang
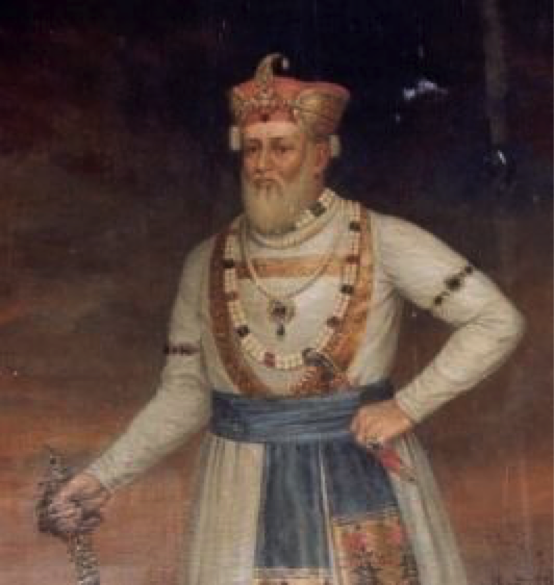
- Portrait of Nawab Faizullah Khan

Rampur
- Reign: 1774–1794
- Coronation: 1774
- Predecessor: Nawab Ali Mohammad Khan Bahadur Rohilla
- Successor: Nawab Muhammad Ali Khan

Shikohabad
- Reign: 1761–1774
- Predecessor: Ahmad Shah Durrani
- Successor: Nawab Shuja-ud-Daula

Chief of The Rohilla
- Reign: 1764–1794
- Predecessor: Nawab Saidullah Khan Rohilla of Moradabad
- Successor: Nawab Muhammad Ali Khan Bahadur of Rampur
- Born: Fazul Khan; 23 September 1730; Rampur State (present-day Rampur, Uttar Pradesh)
- Died: 17 September 1794 (aged 64)
- Burial: Near Eidgah in Rampur
Names
- Nawab Faizullah Ali Khan Bahadur Rohilla, Mustaid Jang, Nawab of Rampur
- House: Rampur
- Dynasty: Rohilla
- Father: Ali Mohammad Khan
- Mother: Marghalari Begum
- Religion: Islam

Nawab Faizullah Ali Khan (c. 1730 – 17 July 1794) was the first Nawab of Rampur. Following the defeat of the Rohillas in the First Rohilla War, Faizullah, the only surviving heir of Nawab Ali Mohammed Khan and opponent of the forces of Nawab of Awadh and the British East India Company in the war, was installed as the ruler of the newly created Rampur State. The state was carved out of the dismembered Kingdom of Rohilkhand. It bordered the Maratha Confederacy to the south, making it a strategically significant territory. Under the tutelage of the East India Company, Faizullah ruled peacefully for 20 years. The capital, Rampur, was founded during his reign, and the Raza Library collection was initiated.

== Biography ==
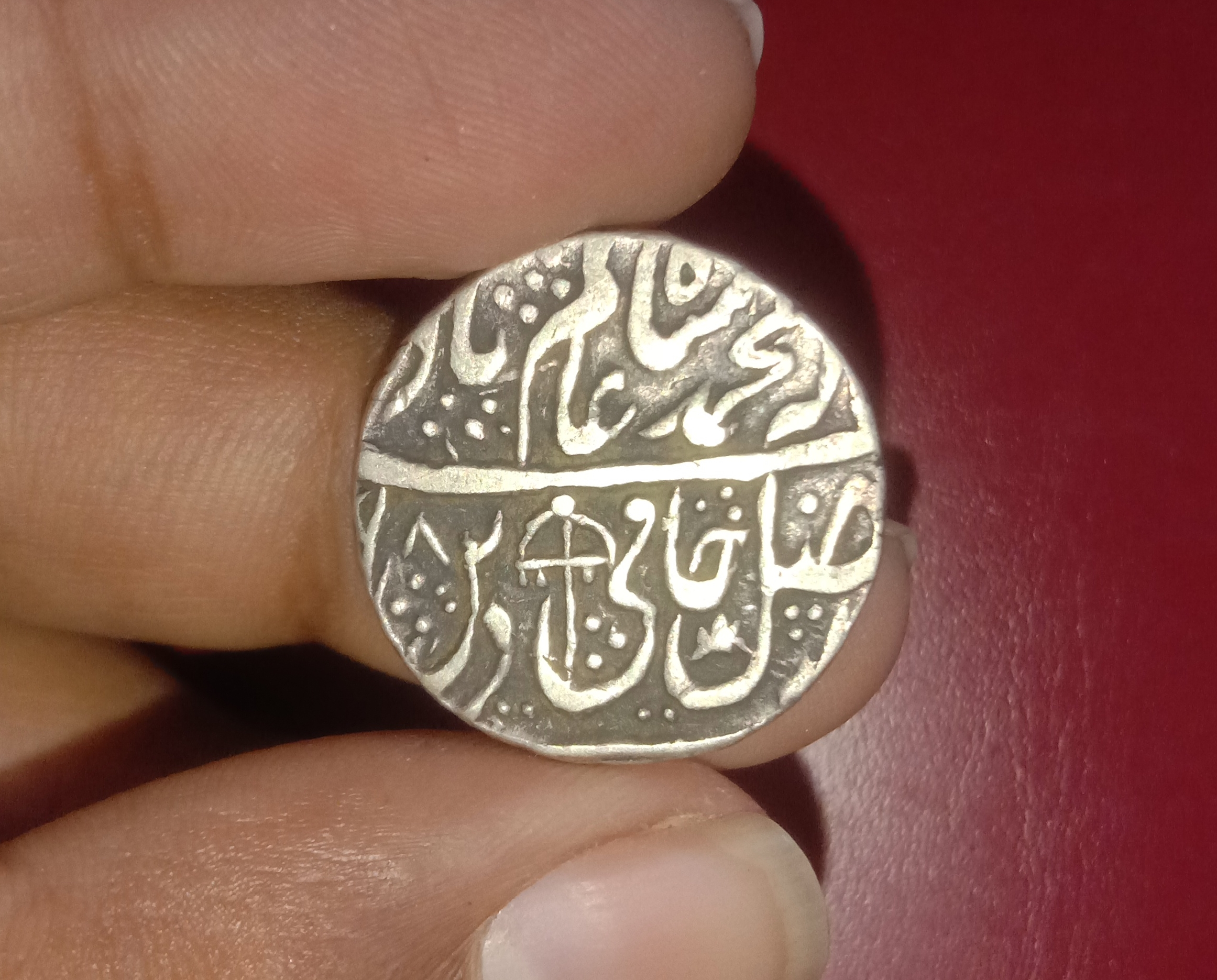
Silver Rupee from the Kingdom of Rohilkhand, minted in Qasba Panipat during the tenure of Faizullah Khan, struck in the name of Mughal emperor Shah Alam II, with having "saya-e-fazle elah" couplet, Swastika and Parasol marks.

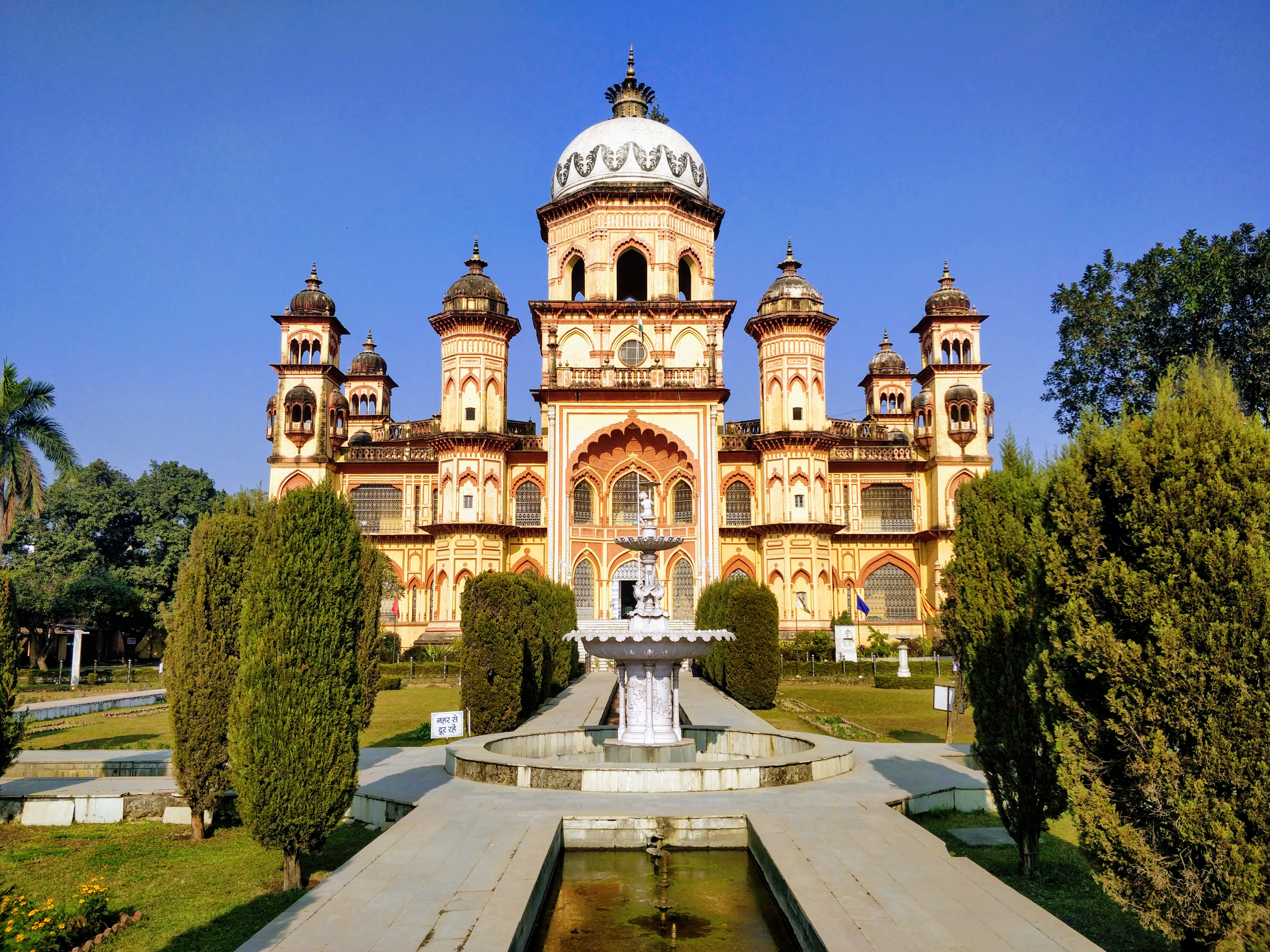
The Raza Library, established by Faizullah Khan and maintained by his successors. The Indian government took it over in 1975.

Faizullah was of mixed ancestry. His father was a Nain Jat and his mother was a Matni Pashtun. The second son of Nawab Ali Mohammed Khan, Faizullah succeeded his elder brother, Nawab Saadullah Khan, as chief of the Rohillas. He fought alongside Ahmad Shah Durrani in the Third Battle Of Panipat and was granted Shikohabad in recognition of his service.

=== First Rohilla War ===
In 1774, during the invasion of Rohilkhand by the united armies of the Vizier Shuja-ud-Daula and the British East India Company, Faizullah Khan led a resistance in which many of the Rohilla's principal chiefs were killed. Escaping from the slaughter, Faizullah Khan made his retreat good towards the mountains, with all his treasure. He collected the scattered remains of his countrymen; and as he was the eldest surviving son of Ali Mohammed Khan, he seems at length to have been generally acknowledged by his natural subjects the undoubted heir of his father's authority.

Nawab Faizullah Khan with the remaining Rohilla's sought refuge in the forest of the hills of Lal Dang where the war eventually became a war of attrition, after a siege of one month both sides sought peace. Eventually, Shuja ud Daula's plan of realising Hafiz Rehmat Khan's son Mohabbat Khan in order to undermine the authority of Nawab Faizullah Khan, helped bring Faizullah Khan into negotiations. A treaty mediated by Colonel Champion helped resolve the situation, bringing an outcome of desire for both sides. The treaty of Lal Dang allowed Faizullah Khan to choose any area for his future Rohilla State with Faizullah choosing Rampur.

=== Treaty of Lal Dang ===
The Treaty of Lal Dang included the following provisions:

- Faizullah had to reduce his army from 20,000 to 5,000, expelling all other troops to the east of the Ganges
- Faizullah was to be diplomatically isolated, only being allowed to enter into correspondence with the British East India Company or the Nawab of Awadh.
- Faizullah was to consider the enemies of Awadh as his own and the friends of Awadh as his own. He was further obliged to raise up to 3000 troops in case Awadh went to war. He was additionally required to personally also join the Nawab-Wazir of Awadh if the latter personally led in any war.

This treaty helped serve to bring Rampur into the sphere of British control, as soon with the death of Shuja ud Daula, Asaf ud Daula's accession saw the Nawab of Awadh reduced to a British puppet.

=== Rampur State ===
Faizullah Khan soon saw the precariousness of the situation that he had found himself in, with Awadh reduced to a puppet state his authority was palpably undermined, therefore he immediately sought to have the treaty ratified and legitimised by the Governor General in council of the East India Company. His concerns became particularly worrisome when the British Resident John Bristow threatened to seize his "Jagir". Desperate, he wrote to the Governor-General in Calcutta that he would be willing to enter into the services of the company if the British insisted on annexing his state. The Governor-General Warren Hastings eventually instructed the Resident at Lucknow, Nathaniel Middleton to ratify the treaty in the company's name, though not before extracting one lakh rupees for the company. Faizullah was not satisfied with the treaty being ratified by the Resident of Lucknow and requested the Governor-General to ratify the treaty himself. This resulted in an angry missive by Middleton who wrote Faizullah, saying:

This sort of argument does little credit to the Khan's usually sound judgment... He knows very well that the Col. Champion had attested the treaty in his private capacity as a witness while the writer has expressly signed it in a representative capacity acting under the orders of the Governor-General in Council.

In this treaty of 1778, Faizullah Khan was able to gain a significant advantage in the ability to retain an excess revenue for himself. However the British were insistent of maximising the military and tributary benefits it derived from Rampur, often in violation of previous treaties. The British especially made use of Rampur's Cavalry, as the region of Rohilkhand was impossible to maintain securely without a highly mobile cavalry. During summer times the region often came under security threat from outlaw Rohillas, Sikhs and Gujars who often carried out lightning raids before returning to their base. British attempts to subvert this were in large part frustrated. The answer came in the form of the highly accomplished Rohilla Cavalry of Rampur.

General Hibbert, commander of British troops in western Awadh in 1774 addresses the Governor General in Council saying: "Like Marathas they (Sikhs and Gujars) are sudden and rapid... it is therefore necessary to oppose them and check their progress at several fords across the Ganges, the Rohilkhand and the Doab, which at this season of the year are very numerous, and as this cannot be affected by a small body of infantry without the assistance of cavalry, I do not think that a part of those which Faizullah Khan has proposed to retain, can be more advantageously employed there for this purpose."

=== Deployments ===
Faizullah Khan sent his forces on several occasions in sight of his commitments to the Lal Dang treaty, these included:

- April 1777 to crush the rebellion of Hafiz Rehmat Khan's son Hurmat Khan in Philibit
- Anglo-French War of 1778–1783, In January 1779, he sent 2000 horse to help the British against the french in South India.
- February 1779, he sent a force of 700 horse under Muhammad Umar Khan to help Col. Muir's force at Daranagar to repel Sikh raids.

1781 to 1783 proved to be stressful years for Faizullah, the constant strain that the company put him under challenged the existence of the Rampur riyasat. In November 1782, Rampuri Troops that had been used for the personal aggrandisement of British Officers rebelled against the Awadh army, bringing an end to the arrangement. This led to the belief that rampur should be annexed by awadh, a belief previously held by the Nawab of Awadh and endorsed by the Residents of Lucknow, to extend to the Governor General Warren Hastings.

=== Extortion by the British ===
The early 1780s saw great strain upon British coffers, with the First Anglo-Maratha war as well as Haider Ali's wars in Mysore largely depleting company funds. The result meant that the British increased their extortionist policies on their subsidiary allies. Not only did these extend to the Begum's of Awadh and on Chait Singh but also upon Rampur State. Faizullah Khan was now being asked by the British to supply 5000 horse for Col. Muir at Fatehgarh. This well exceeded the 3000 horse requirement held by the Treaty of Lal Dang and additionally shocked the company's Court of Directors at the injustice of the Demand. Faizullah khan replied in 1781 that he could only supply the 2000 Horse, as the rest would be needed to maintain law and order in his own country. Despite Warren Hasting's being well aware that Faizullah Khan only possessed 2000 horse. Hastings nonetheless still demanded 3000 horse, an amount less than the original, but still over the stipulated number that the treaty of Lal Dang had required.

=== Annexation Plans by the British ===
The British went further to make preposterous demands on Faizullah Khan, asking him to personally lead troops even though the Nawab Wazir was not personally leading the army. Richard Johnson, an assistant to the Resident at Lucknow was deputed to Rampur and as can be predicted he highly recommended the annexation of Rampur state based on the multiple alleged violations of the treaty by Faizullah Khan. Johnson alleged that Faizullah Khan kept an army of 20,000 soldiers and kept peasants who had deserted Awadh.

Faizullah Khan finally relented to the immense pressure and agreed to provide 2000 horse along with 1000 infantry, all this would be accompanied with a year's advance in salary to the troops and funding to the British. This did not stop Hastings from going to Awadh on 19 September 1781, and signing a treaty with Asaf ud Daula, called the Treaty of Chunar, where the company gave its assent to the annexation of Rampur by Awadh in lieu of an alleged breach of the Treaty of Lal Dang. Hastings kept the proposed plan of annexation stalled looking for an opportune moment, however his plans were thwarted by the Court of Directors in February 1783, who deemed the annexation illegitimate. Noting that: Faizullah Khan's merits with company's on the hand, and the Governor General's treatment of him on the other, must be known to all surrounding powers and if such singular marks of attention of the company's interest and government are thus acquitted we have reason to dread future nominations against us, which may end in the utter extirpation of the English from Hindustan (emphasis added).

=== Further Extortion by British ===
The British continued their pressure of extracting tribute form Rampur, Warren Hastings sent his close friend William Palmer to Faizullah Khan in June 1783. Demanding through Palmer that Faizullah Khan should pay a subsidy for the force of 3000 horse and further reimburse Awadh for the defection of Awadhi peasants to Rampur. Faizullah Khan initially refused, but under further pressure he eventually relented on, paying a lump sum of 15 lakh rupees to the British.

Faizullah Khan astutely dealt with the British, occasionally refusing and occasional completely acquiescing to their demands. His endeavours to prevent war with the company and his efforts to maintain peace in Rampur for over 20 years, allowed him to lay the ground works of power for what would allow Rampur to violently challenge colonial domination in 1794 through the Second Rohilla War.

=== Religion ===
Faizullah Khan belonged to the Rohilla dynasty. His state would become one of the important Shia princely states, along with Awadh. Faizullah Khan was Sunni and wanted his son Muhammad Ali Khan of Rampur to accept the same tradition. However, due to the influence and teaching of Nawab Asaf-ud-Dauala, his eldest son accepted Shia creed.

== Descendants ==
He had 18 children.

From wife Gulzadi Begum Kulan, sister of his brother-in-law Bahadur Khan Kamalzai:

- Nawab Muhammad Ali Khan, eldest son
- Nawab Ghulam Muhammad Khan, son,
- Ajeeb Begum, daughter
- Badshah Begum

From wife Taj Begum of Kamalzai ancestry:

- Syed Hasan Ali Khan, son
- Syed Hussain Ali Khan, son
- Umdah Begum, daughter
- Alahi Khan, daughter

From wife Gulzadi Begum Khird of Kamalzai tribe:

- Syed Nizam Ali Khan, son
- Syed Fatah Ali Khan, son
- Syed Nizam Ali Khan, son
- Syed Qasim Ali Khan, son
- Meena Begum, daughter
- Amani Begum, daughter

From wife Nihayat Begum of Bunerwal ancestry:

- Syed Yaqub Ali Khan, son
- Syed Kareem-ullah Khan, son
- Jani Begum, daughter
- Ajooba khan (aka Bobo), daughter

== Depictions ==
Cultural depictions of Nawab Sayyid Faizullah Khan Bahadur Rohilla of Rampur
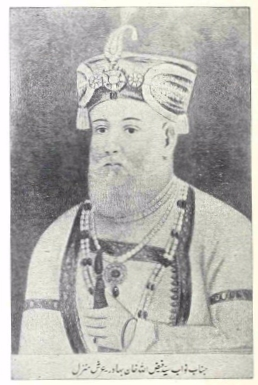
Black and White Portrait of Faizullah Khan

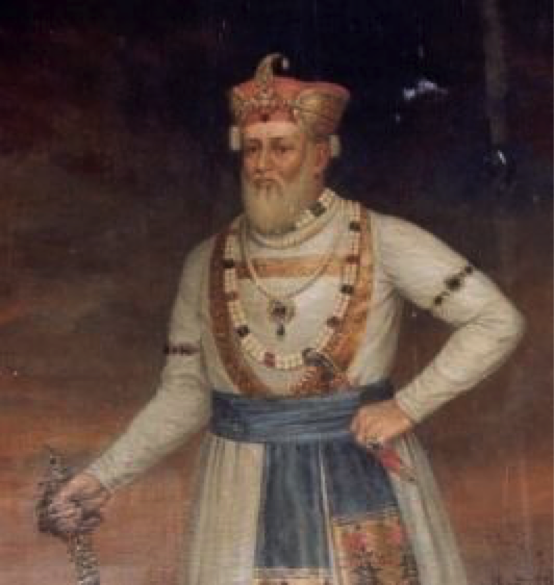
Colour portrait of Faizullah Khan

Faizullah Khan Rohilla Dynasty Born: c.1730 Died: 24 July 1793
Regnal titles
Preceded by Ali Mohammed Khan	Nawab of Rampur; 15 September 1748 – 24 July 1793	Succeeded by Nawab Muhammad Ali Khan

== See also ==
- Muslim Jats
