= Rampur Greyhound =

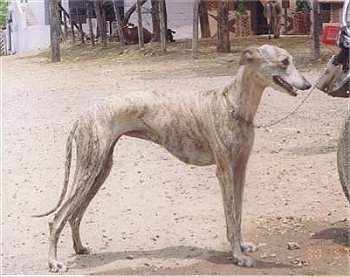
- Rampur Greyhound
- Other names: North-Indian Greyhound; Rampur Dog; Rampur Hound
- Origin: India
Traits
- Height: 56–76 cm (22–30 in)
- Weight: 23–32 kg (51–71 lb)
- Coat: Short
- Colour: Brindle, Black, Grey, Fawn, Brown, White
- Litter size: 3-8

The Rampur Greyhound or the "Rampur Hound" is a large breed of sighthound native to the Rampur region of Northern India, which lies between Delhi and Bareilly. It is believed the Rampur Greyhound descends from early Tazys, with their present-day appearance due to extensive crosses to the Greyhound in the 19th century to improve the breed's speed. The Rampur Greyhound is a short haired, powerfully built sighthound that resembles the Sloughi in appearance. It is rarely seen outside of its native land where it is retained as a coursing dog and is rarely kept as a companion.

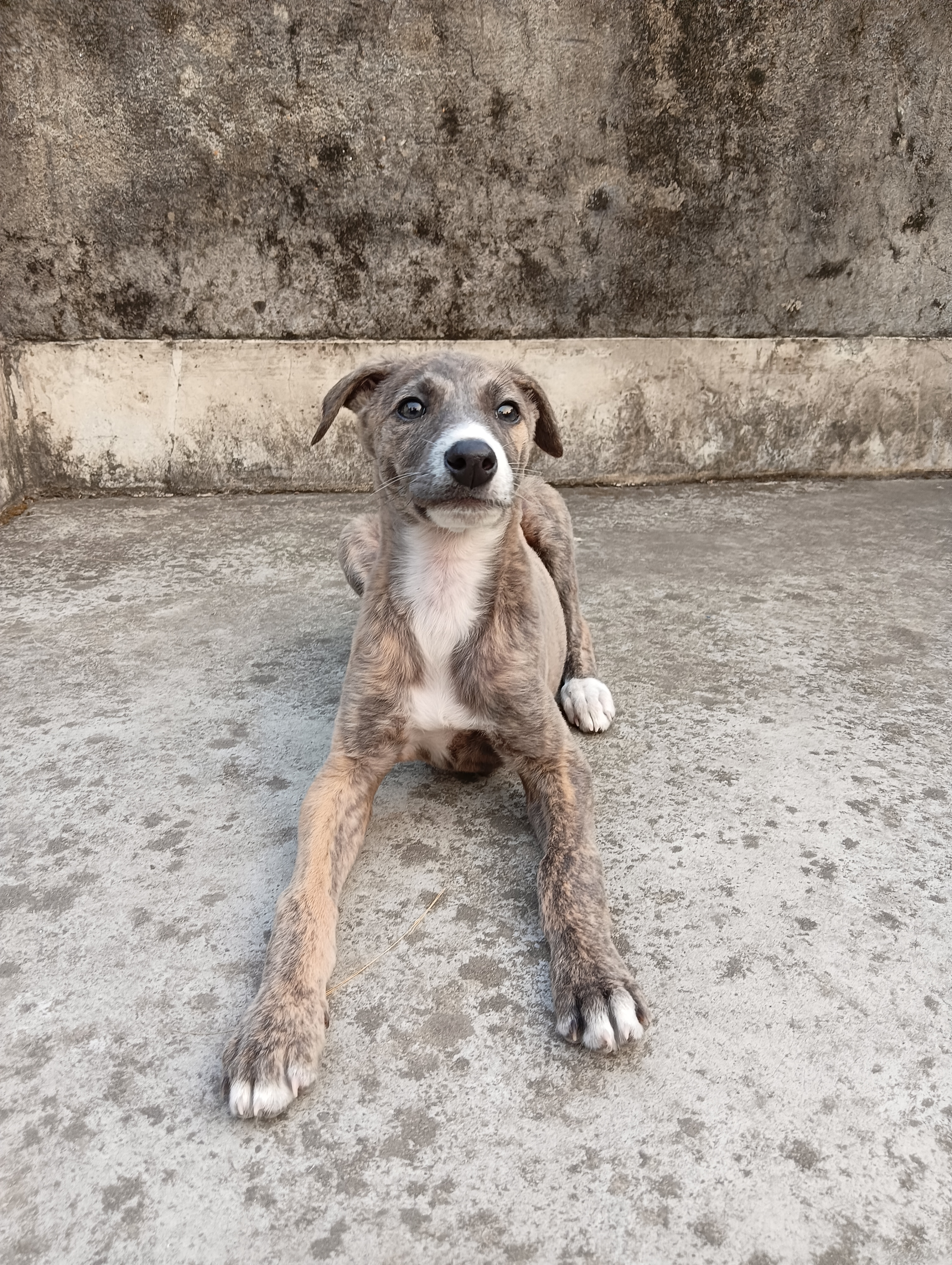
A Rampur Greyhound puppy with a brindle coat colour.

== See also ==
- List of dog breeds
- List of dog breeds from India
- Rampur State
