= Rohilla Wars =

The Rohilla Wars were a series of two wars fought in the Indian sub-continent between Rohilla Nation led by descendants of Ali Mohammad Khan and the British East India Company:

- First Rohilla War (1773–1774)
- Second Rohilla War (1794)
