= Ahmad Ali Khan of Rampur =

Nawab Ahmad Ali Khan of Rampur
- Nawab Of Rampur; Chief of the Rohilla Mutamid ud-Daula and Zafar Jang
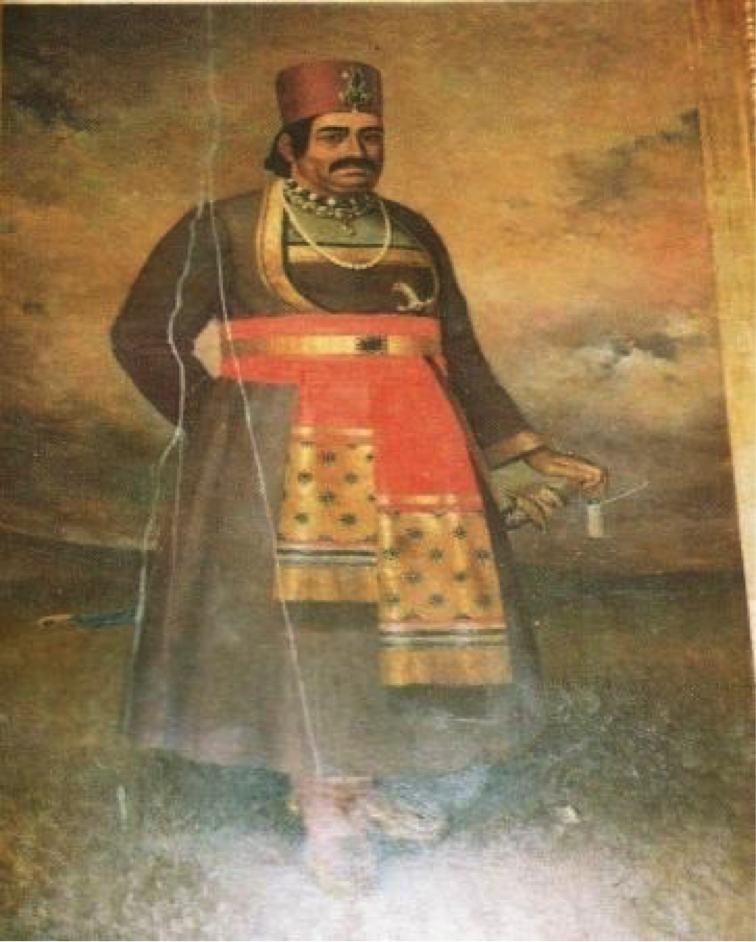
- Nawab Ahmad Ali Khan Bahadur Rohilla of Rampur

Rampur
- Reign: 1794-1840
- Predecessor: Nawab Ghulam Muhammad Khan of Rampur
- Successor: Nawab Muhammad Said Khan Bahdur of Rampur

Chief of the Rohilla
- Reign: 1749- 1849
- Predecessor: Nawab Ghulam Muhammad Khan
- Successor: Nawab Muhammad Said Khan
- Born: 12 October 1787
- Died: 5 July 1840 (aged 52); Qila-E-Mualla, Rampur
- Burial: Nankar
Names
- Nawab Ahmad alI Khan Bahadur Rohilla
Regnal name
- Mutamid ud-Daula, Nawab Ahmad 'Ali Khan Bahadur, Zafar Jang, Nawab of Rampur
- House: Rohilla (by Adoption)
- Father: Nawab Muhammad Ali Khan of Rampur
- Religion: Islam(shia)

Nawab Ahmad Ali Khan Bahadur (12 October 1787 – 5 July 1840) was Nawab of Rampur from 1794 to 1840, succeeding his brother Ghulam Muhammad Khan Bahadur. The only son of Muhammad Ali Khan Bahadur, Ahmad Ali was made Nawab following the deposition of his uncle Ghulam Muhammad by the British East India Company and the Nawab of Awadh. Ahmad Ali ruled for 46 years, although he reigned from 1794 to 1811 under a regency. He transformed the cultural fabric of Rampur and started a tradition of cultural involvement that has been maintained by his successors to the present day. In 1801, Rampur became a vassal of the HEIC following the cession of Rohilkand by the Nawab of Awadh. Ahmad Ali died on 5 July 1840, aged 52. As his only son had died young, he was succeeded as Nawab by his cousin, Muhammad Said Khan Bahadur.

Ahmad Ali Khan is credited with developing the dog breed known as the Rampur Hound. He bred these dogs by combining the ferocious Tāzī Afghan dogs with the English Greyhound, more obedient but less resistant to the harsher local weather. The Nawab gave the name 'Rampur Hound' to the dogs he bred.

== Cultural depictions ==
Nawab Sayyid Ahmad Ali Khan Bahadur Rohilla of Rampur
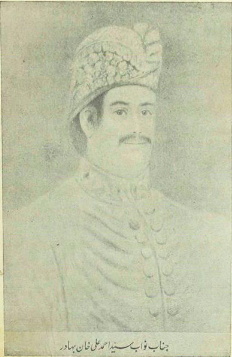
Black and White portrait

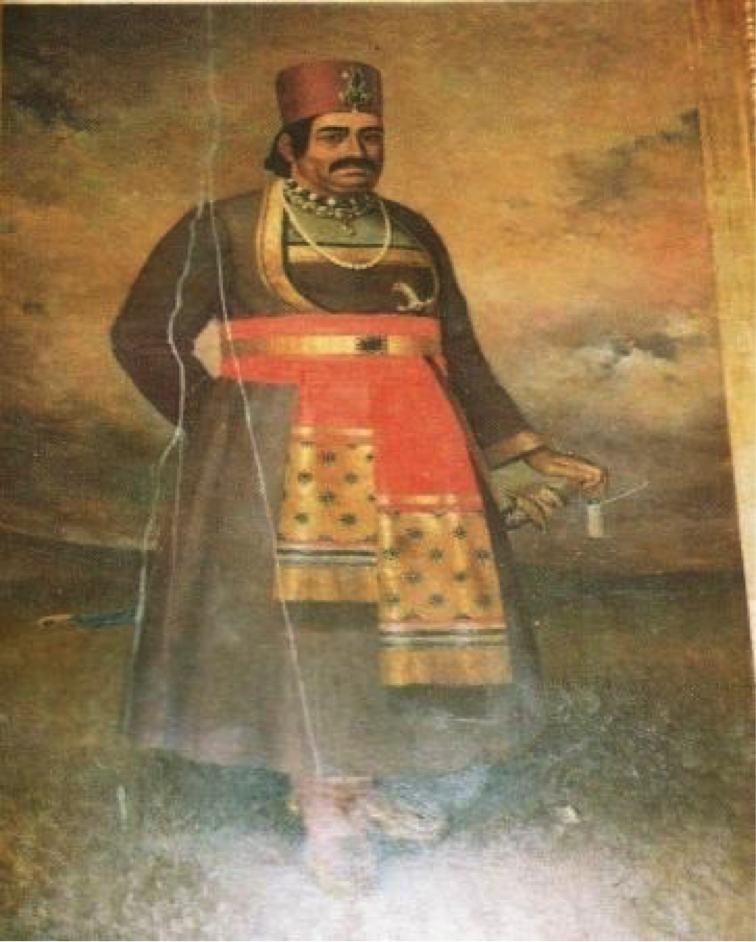
Full length portrait of Nawab Ahmad Ali Khan Bahadur of Rampur

Ahmad Ali Khan of Rampur Rohilla Dynasty Born: 12 October 1787 Died: 5 July 1840
Regnal titles
Preceded by Ghulam Muhammad Khan Bahadur	Nawab of Rampur; 1794–1840	Succeeded by Muhammad Said Khan Bahadur
