= Charles Chapman (British Army officer) =

- Died: 2 August 1795
- Military career
- Allegiance: Kingdom of Great Britain
- Branch: British Army
- Rank: Colonel
- Commands: Indian Army

Colonel Charles Chapman (died 2 August 1795) was Commander-in-Chief, India.

== Military career ==
Educated at Balliol College, Oxford, Chapman served as commanding officer of the 3rd European Regiment in Bengal before becoming Commander-in-Chief, India in December 1773.

He became discredited as an elderly officer whose chief aim was to recoup his gambling losses and was forced from office in January 1774. He retired to Bath and died in 1795.
