= Rampur State =

Princely state of India

Coordinates: 28.8°N 79.0°E

State of Rampur Dar-Ul-Insha دارالانشا
- 1774–1949
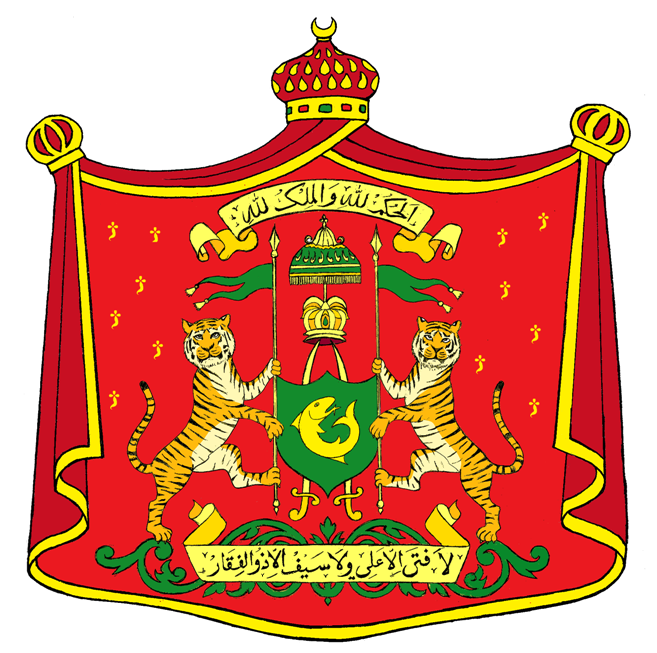
- Flag Coat of arms
- Motto: "الحكم لله والملك لله" "Al Hukumu Lillah Wāl Mulk Lillah".Lā Fata ʾIllā ʿAlī; Lā Sayf ʾIllā Ḏū l-Fiqār. “(Rulership And Sovereignty Belongs To God)” (There Is No Conqueror Like Ali And No Sword Like The Zulfiqar)
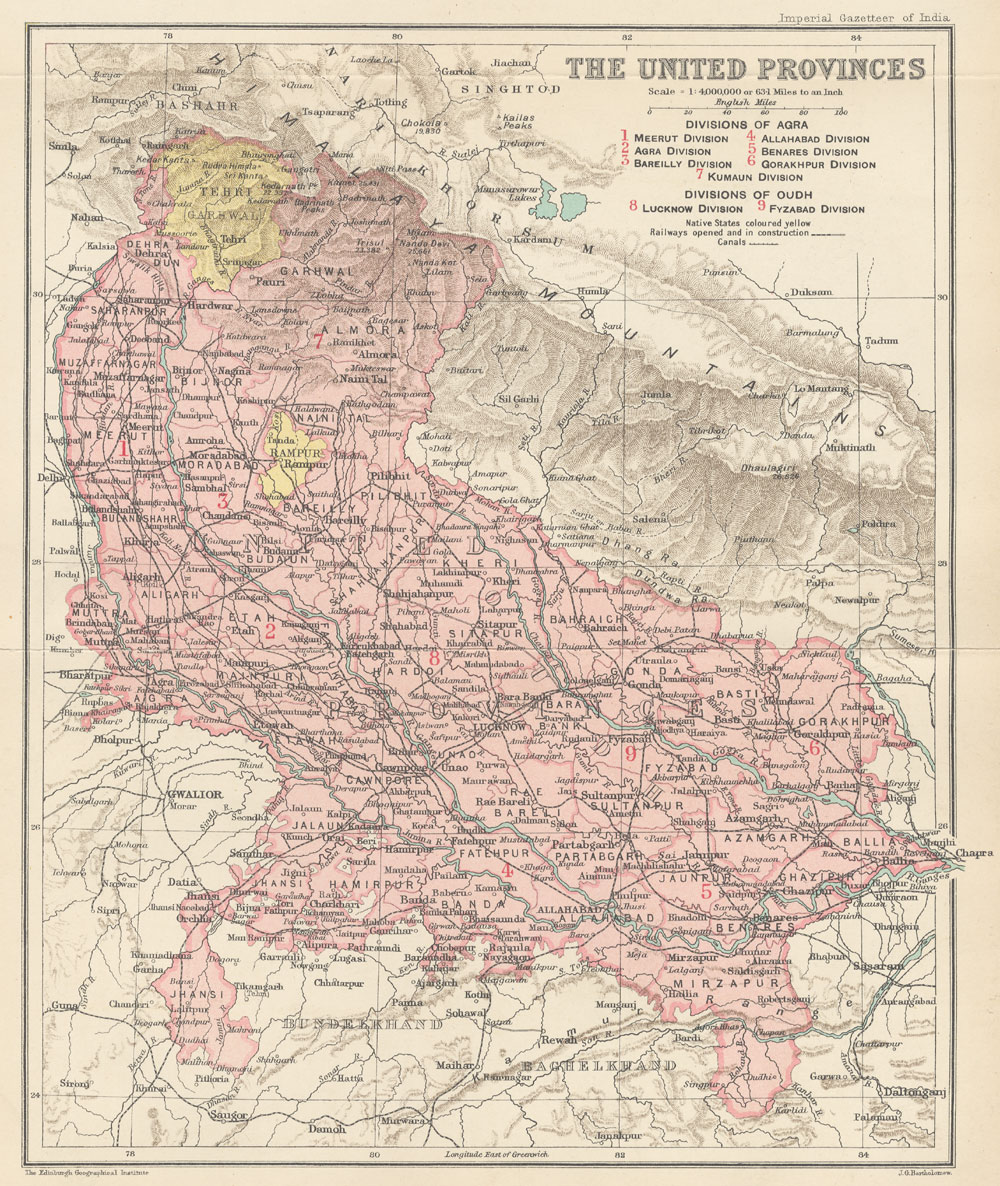
- Rampur State in yellow
- Status: 15 gun-salute princely state
- Capital: Rampur
- Official languages: Urdu; English; Persian
- Other languages: Hindi; Pashto
- Religion: Shi’a Islam (official but small minority, 5%); Sunni Islam (majority, 80%); Hinduism (large minority, 15%)
- Demonym: Rampuri
- Government: Absolute monarchy
- Nawab
  - 1774–1794: Faizullah Khan (First)
  - 1794: Muhammad Ali Khan
  - 1794: Ghulam Muhammad Khan
  - 1794–1840: Ahmad Ali Khan
  - 1930–1949: Raza Ali Khan (Last)
- History
  - First Rohilla War: 7 October, 1774
  - Joined the United Provinces: 1st December 1949

Area
  - Total: 2,447.54 km^{2} (945.00 sq mi) (1st; princely state)
  - Water (%): 1

Population
  - Estimate: 546,151
  - Census: 1901
- Time zone: UTC+5:30
Preceded by	Succeeded by
Kingdom of Rohilkhand; Oudh State	India; Uttar Pradesh
- Today part of: Uttar Pradesh, India

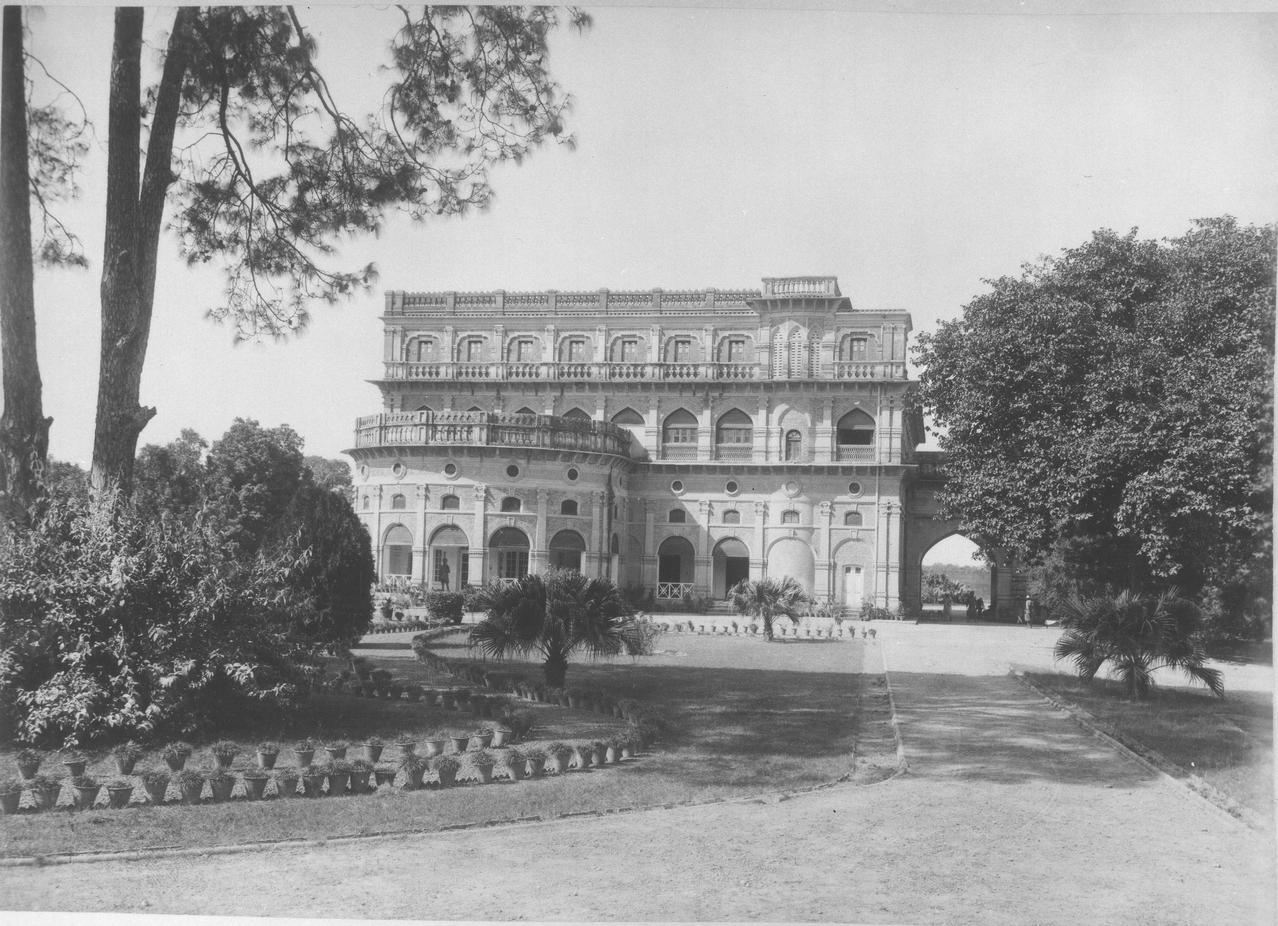
Khusru Bagh Palace of Rampur

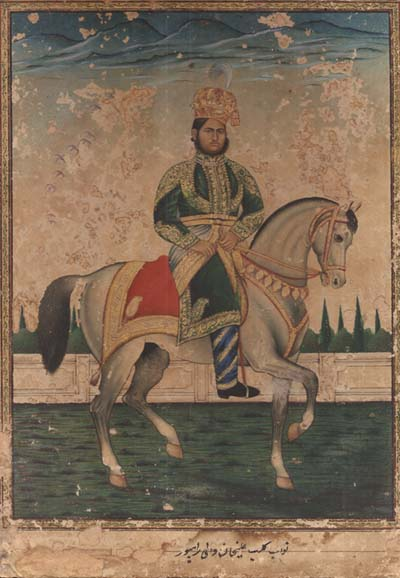
Nawab Kalb Ali Khan Bahadur of Rampur, r. 1865–87.

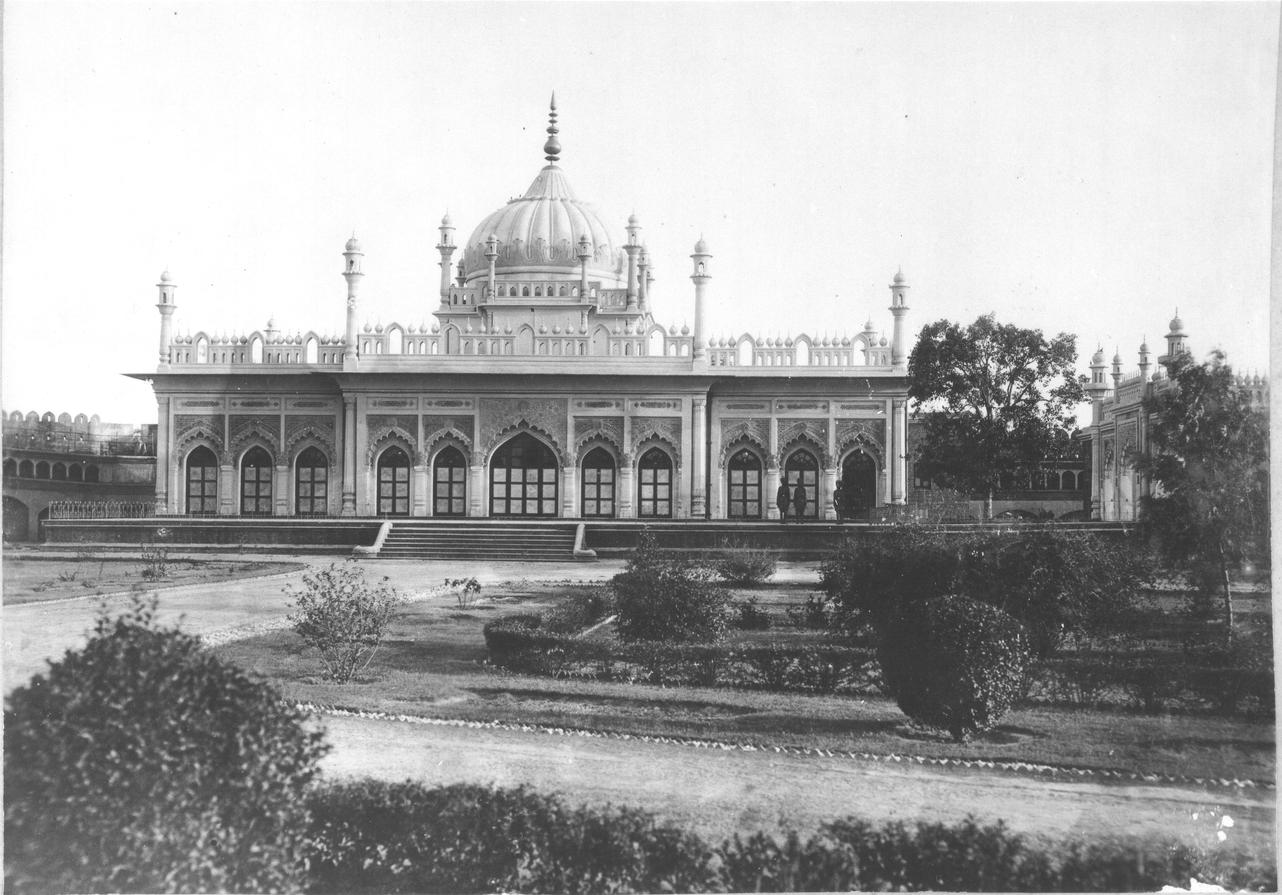
Imambara, Fort of Rampur, Uttar Pradesh, c. 1911.

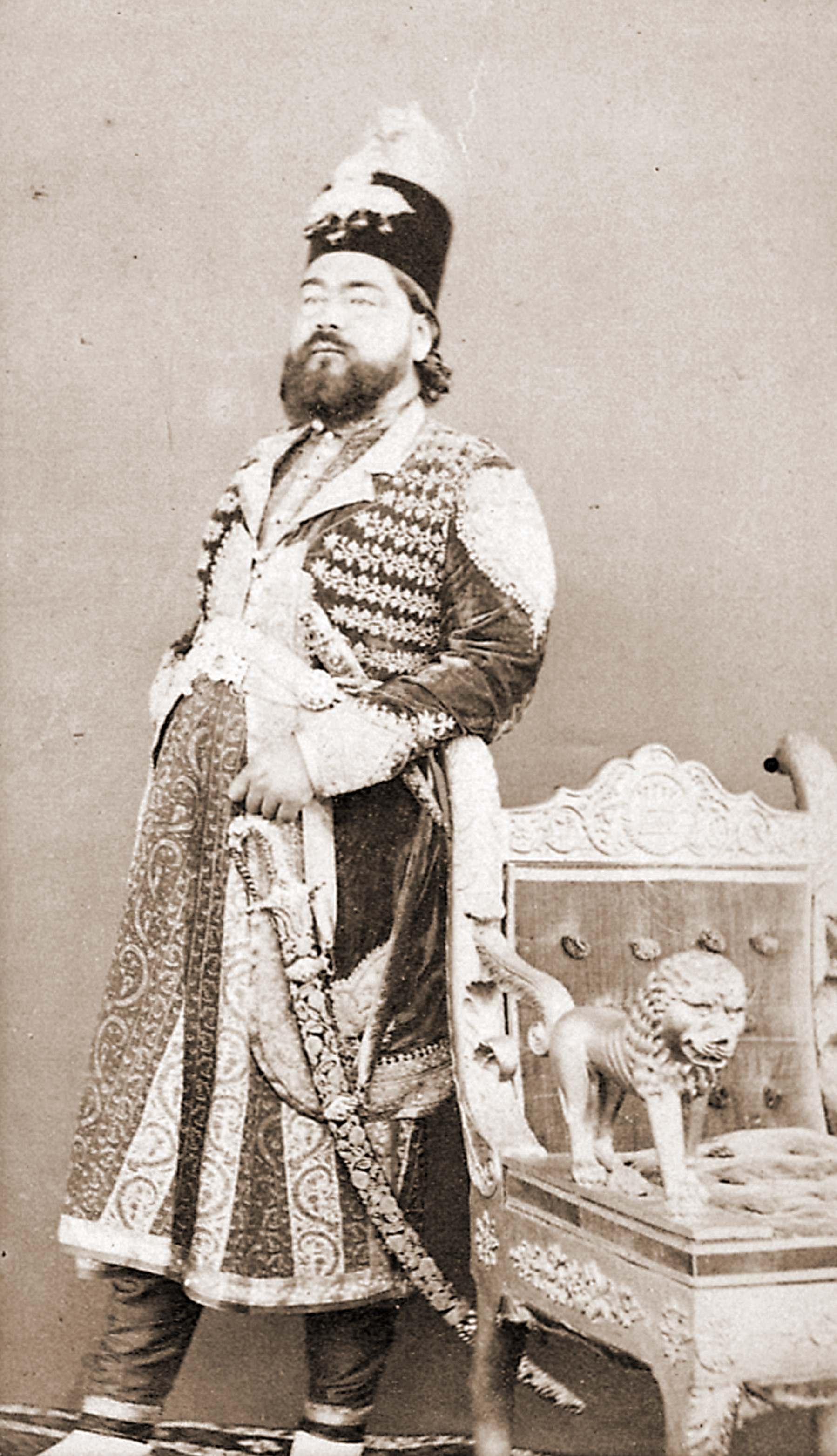
Sir Kalb Ali Khan, Nawab of Rampur (1832–1887).

Rampur State was a 15 gun-salute princely state of British India. Following the Rohilla defeat in the First Rohilla War, the British would establish the state, and install Faizullah Khan as its first Nawab. The state's capital was Rampur, and its total area was 945 sq miles.

Following independence in 1947, Rampur State acceded to India. It was merged into the United Provinces, which would later become Uttar Pradesh.

== Origin ==
The Rampur State was established by Nawab Faizullah Khan on 7 October 1774, in the presence of British Commander Colonel Champion, and remained a pliant state under British protection thereafter. Faizullah Khan was a leader among the Rohillas and a member of the Rohilla dynasty. He was the son of Ali Mohammed Khan, founder of the Kingdom of Rohilkhand— a Jat by origin who was adopted and converted by Sardar Daud Khan Barech.

For the Rohillas, Rampur State was one of the most important princely states in Hindustan.

In the 19th century, the Nawabs of Rampur claimed that Ali Mohammed Khan was a Barha Sayyid and started using the title of Sayyid. However, they could not present any pedigree in the support of this claim.

== History ==
The First Rohilla War began when the Rohillas reneged on a debt they owed to the Nawab of Oudh for military assistance against the Maratha Empire in 1772. The Rohillas were defeated and driven from their former capital of Bareilly by the Nawab of Oudh with the assistance of the East India Company's troops lent by Warren Hastings.

The first stone of the new Fort at Rampur was laid and the city of Rampur founded in 1775 by Nawab Faizullah Khan. Originally it was a group of four villages named Kather, the name of Raja Ram Singh. The first Nawab proposed to rename the city 'Faizabad'. But many other places were known by the name Faizabad so its name was changed to Mustafabad alias Rampur. Nawab Faizullah Khan ruled for 20 years. He was a great patron of scholarship, and began the collection of Arabic, Persian, Turkish and Urdu manuscripts which now make up the bulk of the Rampur Raza Library. After his death, his son Muhammad Ali Khan took over. He was killed by the Rohilla leaders after 24 days, and Ghulam Muhammad Khan – the brother of the deceased, was proclaimed Nawab. The East India Company took exception to this, and after a reign of just 3 months and 22 days Ghulam Muhammad Khan was defeated by its forces, and the Governor-General made Ahmad Ali Khan, son of the late Muhammad Ali Khan, the new Nawab. He ruled for 44 years. He did not have any sons, so Muhammad Sa'id Khan, son of Ghulam Muhammad Khan, took over as the new Nawab. He raised a regular Army, established Courts and carried out many works to improve the economic conditions of farmers. His son Muhammad Yusuf Ali Khan took over after his death. His son Kalb Ali Khan became the new Nawab after his death in 1865.

Nawab Kalb Ali Khan was literate in Arabic and Persian. Under his rule the state did much work to uplift standards of education. He was also a Member of Council during the Viceroyalty of Lord John Lawrence. He built the Jama Masjid in Rampur at a cost of Rs. 300,000. He was also knighted in Agra by the Prince of Wales. He ruled for 22 years and 7 months. After his death his son Mushtaq Ali Khan took over. He appointed W. C. Wright as the Chief Engineer of the estate. He built many new buildings and canals. Nawab Hamid Ali became the new ruler in 1889 at the age of 14. Many new schools were opened during his reign, and many donations were provided to nearby colleges. He donated Rs. 50,000 to Lucknow Medical College. In 1905 he built the magnificent Darbar Hall within the Fort which now houses the great collection of Oriental manuscripts held by the Rampur Raza Library. His son Raza Ali Khan became the last ruling Nawab in 1930. Nawab Raza Ali Khan was a very progressive ruler who believed in the Inclusion of Hindus and so appointed Lt. Col. Horilal Varma – Bar At Law as his Prime Minister. On 1 July 1949 the State of Rampur was merged into the Republic of India. Rampur today presents a slightly decayed appearance: the palaces of the Nawabs are crumbling, as are the gates and walls of the fort. However, the Library remains a flourishing institution of immense value to scholars from all over the world.

The Nawabs of Rampur sided with the British during Indian Rebellion of 1857 and this enabled them to continue to play a role in the social, political and cultural life of Northern India in general and the Muslims of United Provinces in particular. They gave refuge to some of the literary figures from the Court of Bahadur Shah Zafar.

=== Music ===
The Rampur-Sahaswan gharana of Hindustani classical music also has its origins in court musicians. Ustad Mehboob Khan, was a khayal singer and Veena player of the Rampur court; his son Ustad Inayat Hussain Khan (1849–1919), who trained and lived in the city, founded the gharana.

The Nawabs of Rampur gave patronage to traditional music in their court. Mehboob Khan was the chief khyal singer of the royal court of Rampur State, his tradition was followed by his son Inayat Hussain Khan (1849–1919) and in turn by Inyat's brothers-in-law, Haider Khan (1857–1927), and Mushtaq Hussein Khan (d. 1964), which gave rise to the Rampur-Sahaswan gharana of Hindustani classical music, the latter being their ancestral place, Sahaswan, in present-day Badaun district.

== Rulers of Rampur ==
The following is a table delineating the succession of rulers belonging to the Royal House of Rampur:

Name		Reign Began	Reign Ended
1	Faizullah Khan	15 September 1774	24 July 1793
	Hafiz Rahmat Khan – Regent	15 September 1748	23 April 1774
2	Muhammad Ali Khan Bahadur	24 July 1793	11 August 1793
3	Ghulam Muhammad Khan Bahadur	11 August 1793	24 October 1794
4	Ahmad Ali Khan Bahadur	24 October 1794	5 July 1840
	Nasrullah Khan – Regent	24 October 1794	1811
5	Muhammad Said Khan Bahadur	5 July 1840	1 April 1855
6	Yusef Ali Khan Bahadur	1 April 1855	21 April 1865
7	Kalb Ali Khan Bahadur	21 April 1865	23 March 1887
8	Muhammad Mushtaq Ali Khan Bahadur	23 March 1887	25 February 1889
9	Hamid Ali Khan Bahadur	25 February 1889	20 June 1930
	Regency	25 February 1889	4 April 1894
10	Raza Ali Khan Bahadur	20 June 1930	6 March 1966
11	Murtaza Ali Khan Bahadur – Titular	6 March 1966	8 February 1982

=== Family tree ===
- I. Sayyid Faizu’llah ‘Ali Khan Bahadur, Nawab of Rampur (1734–1794; Nawab of Rampur: 1734–1794)
  - II. Sayyid Muhammad Ali Khan Bahadur, Nawab of Rampur (1751–1794; r. 1794)
    - IV. Sayyid Ahmad Ali Khan Bahadur, Nawab of Rampur (1787–1840; r. 1794–1840)
  - III. Hajji Sayyid Ghulam Muhammad Khan Bahadur, Nawab of Rampur (1763–1823; r. 1794)
    - V. Sayyid Muhammad Said Khan Bahadur, Nawab of Rampur (1786–1855; r. 1840–1855)
      - VI. Sayyid Muhammad Yusef Ali Khan Bahadur, Nawab of Rampur KSI (1816–1865; r. 1855–1865)
        - VII. Hajji Sayyid Muhammad Kalb-i-Ali Khan Bahadur, Nawab of Rampur GCSI, CIE (1834–1887; r. 1865–1887)
          - VIII. Sayyid Muhammad Mushtaq Ali Khan Bahadur, Nawab of Rampur (1856–1889; r. 1887–1889)
            - IX. Sayyid Hamid Ali Khan Bahadur, Nawab of Rampur GCSI, GCIE, GCVO (1875–1930; r. 1889–1930)
              - X. Sayyid Muhammad Raza Ali Khan Bahadur, Nawab of Rampur GCIE, KCSI (1908–1966; r. 1930–1949; titular ruler 1949–1966)
                - XI. Sayyid Murtaza Ali Khan Bahadur MBE (lived 1923–1982; titular Nawab: 1966–1971; family head: 1971–1982)

== Orders of chivalry ==
The Royal House of Rampur awards two orders of chivalry; these knighthoods include:

- Nishan-i-Hamidiya (Order of Hamid), established by Nawab Hamid Ali Khan Bahadur in 1894 and is awarded in three grades; its postnominals are NH.
- Nishan-i-Iqbal (Order of Iqbal), established by Nawab Hamid Ali Khan Bahadur in 1927 and is awarded in three grades; its postnominals are NI.

The majority of the recipients of the Nishan-e-Hamidiya are those of various royal families while honourees with the Nishan-e-Iqbal are those who have made significant contributions to academia, culture, humanitarian aid, research and society.

== Legacy ==
=== Education ===
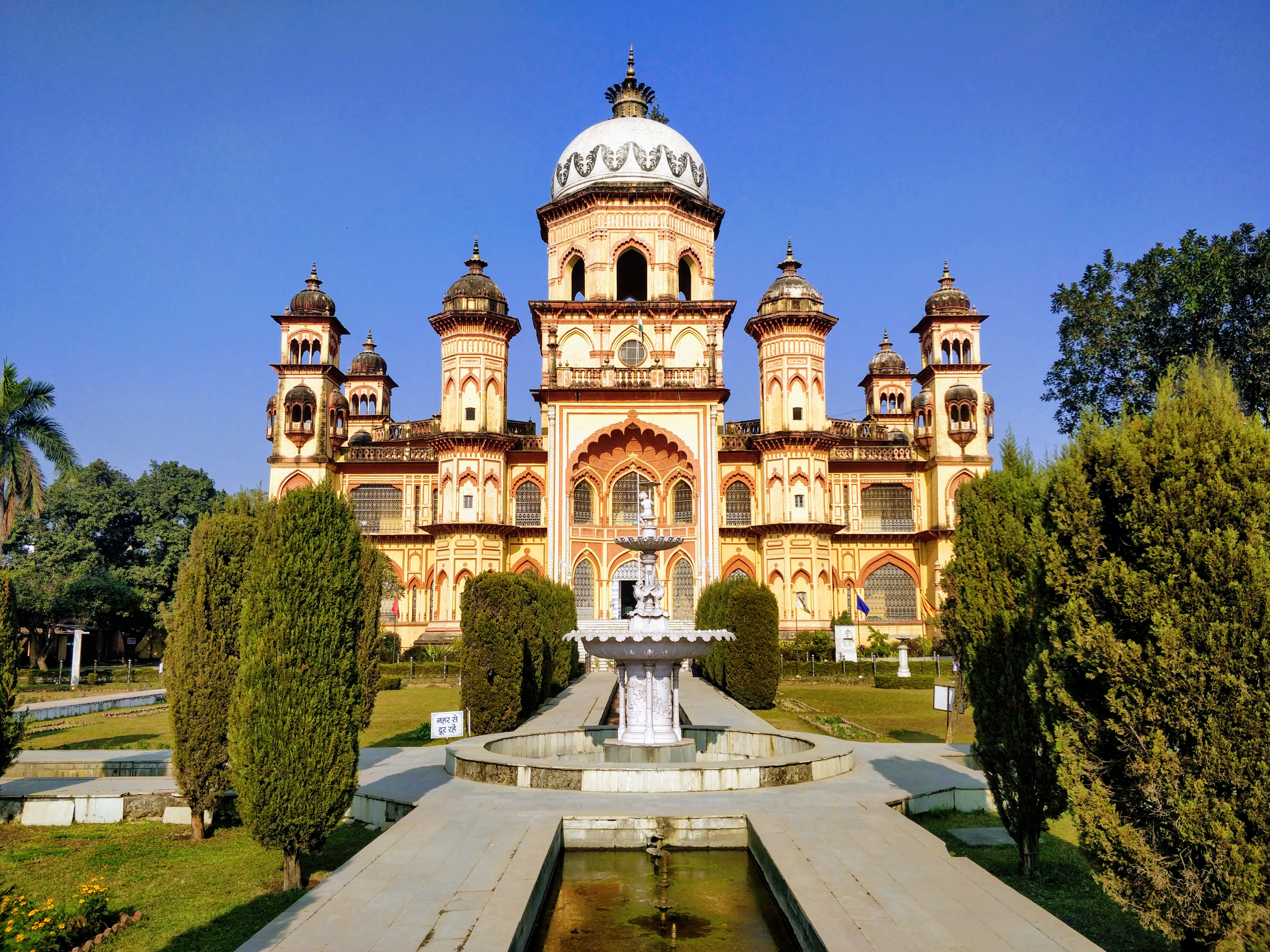
Front facade of the Raza Library

Nawab Faizullah Khan, the first Nawab of Rampur, established the Rampur Raza Library from his personal collection of manuscripts and miniature specimens of Islamic calligraphy in 1774. The succeeding Nawabs continued to be patrons of scholars, poets, painters, calligraphers and musicians, enabling the library to grow rapidly. The Indian government would take over the library in 1975.

=== Dog breed ===
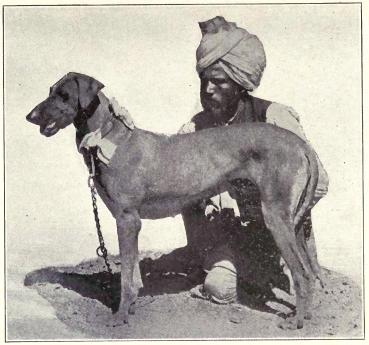
A palace attendant with a Rampur Hound in 1915

Nawab Ahmad Ali Khan of Rampur is credited with developing the dog breed known as the Rampur Hound. The Rampur Hound is the result of cross-breeding the Sag-e Tazi Afghan Hound with the English Greyhound. He named the dogs after his capital.

=== Cuisine ===
The cuisine of the royal courts over the years gave rise to the Rampuri cuisine, developed by the chefs of the Nawabs. After the Indian Mutiny of 1857, the khansamas (chefs) from erstwhile Mughal imperial courts shifted to Rampur, bringing along with them the Mughal cuisine tradition. Gradually people from other places also found a haven here, adding influences of Awadhi, Hyderabad and Kashmiri cuisine. It is also known for its distinct flavours and dishes with recipes passed on from the royal kitchen, like Rampuri fish, Rampuri Korma, Rampuri mutton kebabs, Doodhiya Biryani and adrak ka halwa.

=== Music ===
Mehboob Khan was the chief khyal singer of the royal court of Rampur State, his tradition was followed by his son Inayat Hussain Khan (1849–1919) and in turn by Inyat's brothers-in-law, Haider Khan (1857–1927), and Mushtaq Hussein Khan (d. 1964), which gave rise to the Rampur-Sahaswan gharana of Hindustani classical music, the latter being their ancestral place, Sahaswan, in present Badaun district.

== See also ==
- Rohillas
- Rohilla dynasty
- Rohilkhand
- Rampur, Uttar Pradesh
- Rampur Raza Library
- Rampur Greyhound
- Princely states

== Bibliography ==
- Bonnie C Wade (1984). Khyāl: Creativity Within North India's Classical Music Tradition. Cambridge University Press Archive. ISBN 0521256593.
