= Muhammad Ali Khan of Rampur =

Nawab Sayyid Muhammad Ali Khan Bahadur
- Nawab of Rampur
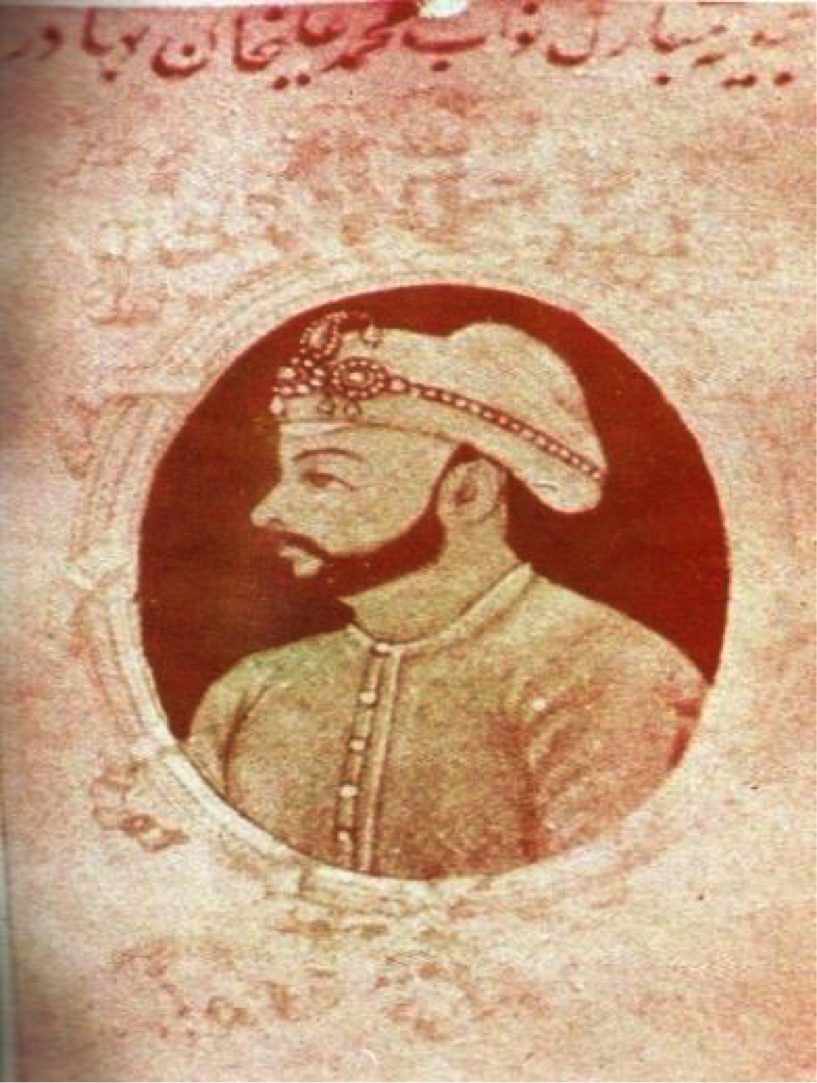
- Rampur State Coat of Arms

Rampur
- Reign: February 1793 – 14 August 1793

Chief of the Rohilla
- Reign: February 1794 – August 1794
- Predecessor: Nawab Faizullah Khan Bahadur of Rampur
- Successor: Nawab Ghulam Muhammad Khan Bahdur of Rampur
- Born: Muhammad Ali Khan; 1750
- Died: 1794 (aged 43–44); Dungarpur
- Burial: Madrassa Muhalla Dungarpur
- House: Rohilla (by Adoption)
- Father: Nawab Faizullah Ali Khan Bahadur of Rampur
- Mother: Gulzadi Begum Kulan Kamalzai
- Religion: Islam(Shia)

Nawab Muhammad Ali Khan Bahadur (1750 – 20 September 1794) was the eldest son of Faizullah Khan and briefly Nawab of Rampur between 24 July and 11 August 1793 when he was deposed by his younger brother Ghulam Muhammad Khan Bahadur and exiled to Dungarpur. He died there a year later as a prisoner when he was shot in his sleep. His only son, Ahmad Ali Khan Bahadur, later became Nawab of Rampur.

Muhammad Ali Khan of Rampur Rohilla Dynasty Born: 1750 Died: 20 September 1794
Regnal titles
Preceded by Faizullah Khan	Nawab of Rampur; 1793 (24 July – 11 August)	Succeeded by Ghulam Muhammad Khan Bahadur
