= Ghulam Muhammad Khan =

Nawab of Rampur from 1793 to 1794

Nawab Ghulam Muhammad Khan
- Nawab Ali Jah, Amir ul-Umara, Nasir ul-Mulk, Mukhlis ud-Daula, Mustaid Jang
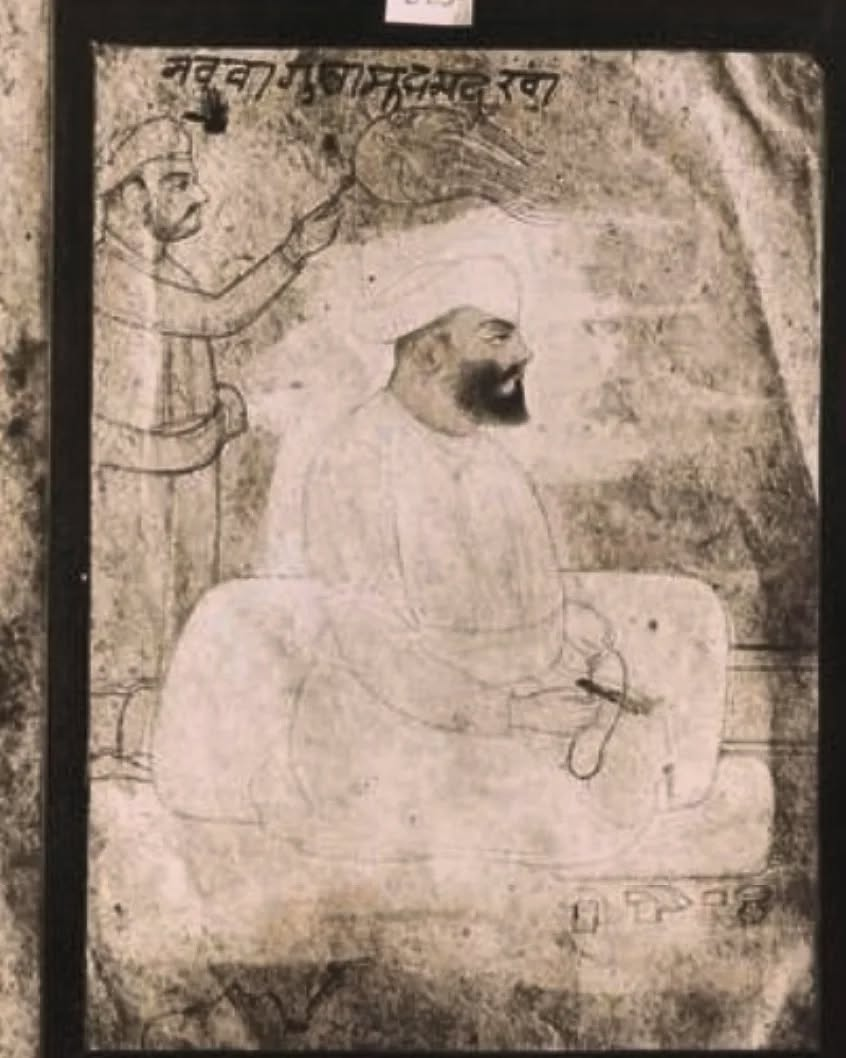
- Seated portrait of the Rohilla ruler Ghulam Muhammad Khan of Rampur State, inscribed with Nagari script, circa 18th century

Nawab of Rampur
- Reign: 14 August 1793 – 29 November 1794
- Predecessor: Nawab Muhammad Ali Khan of Rampur
- Successor: Nawab Ahmed Ali Khan of Rampur

Chief of the Rohilla
- Predecessor: Nawab Muhammad Ali Khan of Rampur
- Successor: Nawab Ahmad Ali Khan of Rampur
- Born: 11 July 1763
- Died: 16 February 1828 (aged 64); Nadaun, Punjab
Names
- Ali Jah, Amir ul-Umara, Nasir ul-Mulk, Mukhlis ud-Daula, Nawab Ghulam Muhammad Khan Bahdur Rohilla of Rampur, Mustaid Jang The Nawab Of Rampur
- House: Rohilla (by Adoption)
- Father: Nawab Faizullah Ali Khan Bahadur of Rampur
- Religion: Shia Islam

Al-Haj Nawab Ghulam Muhammad Khan Bahadur (11 July 1763 – 16 February 1828) was briefly Nawab of Rampur from 1793 to 1794. The younger son of Faizullah Khan, Ghulam Muhammad became Nawab in 1793 after deposing his elder brother, Muhammad Ali Khan Bahadur. His reign quickly took on a tyrannical aspect, and he was soon deemed a danger to the region's stability. Thus, in 1794, he was himself deposed by troops of the East India Company and of the Nawab of Awadh, being succeeded as Nawab by his nephew, Ahmad Ali Khan Bahadur. Ghulam Muhammad then undertook the Hajj, after which he fled to Mysore and Tipu Sultan, later settling in the Punjab. He died at Nadaun in 1828.

== Cultural depictions ==
Nawab Sayyid Ghulam Muhammad Khan Bahadur Rohilla
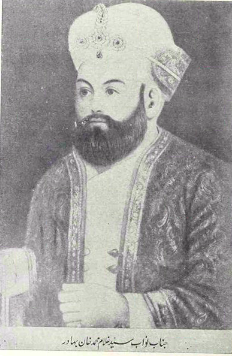
Black and White Portrait

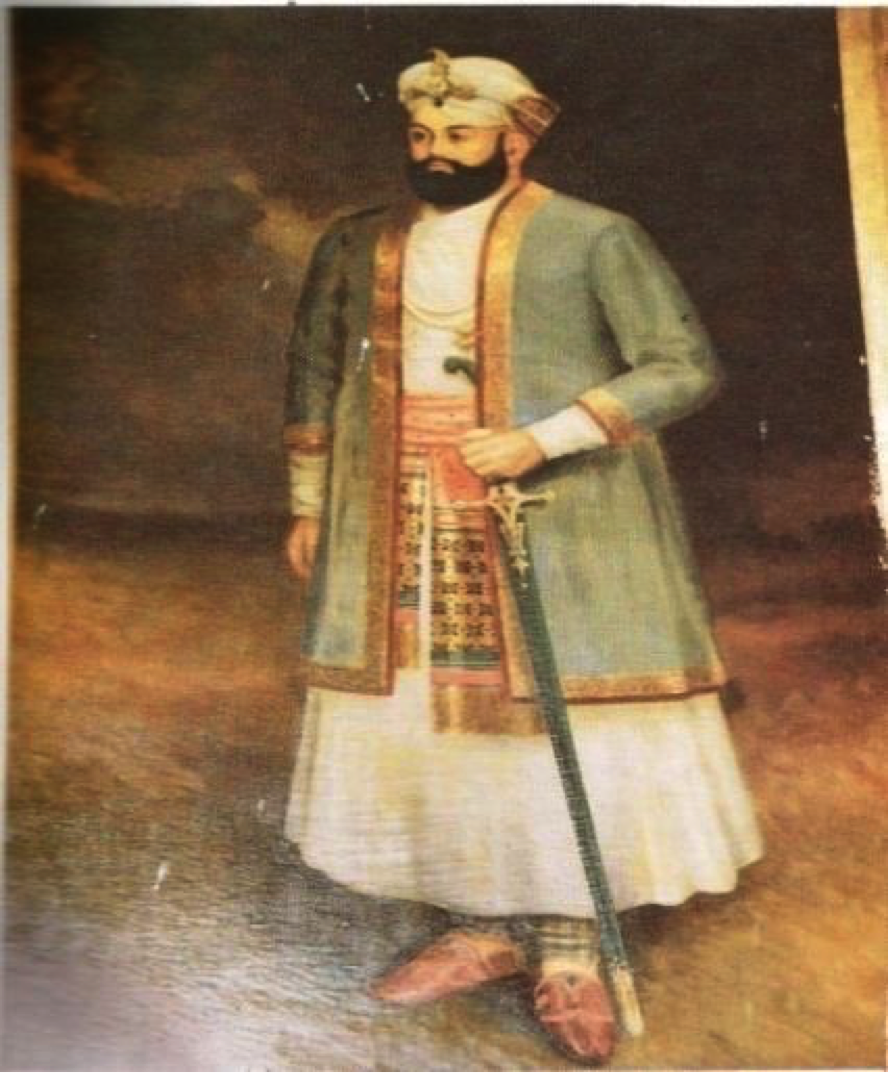
Full length colour portrait
