= Kalb Ali Khan =

Nawab Kalb E Ali Khan Bahadur of Rampur
- Nawab of Rampur; Chief of the Rhohilla His Highness, ‘Ali Jah, Farzand-i-Dilpazir-i-Daulat-i-Inglishia, Mukhlis ud-Daula, Nasir ul-Mulk, Amir ul-Umara, Haji, Nawab Khuld Ashiyan
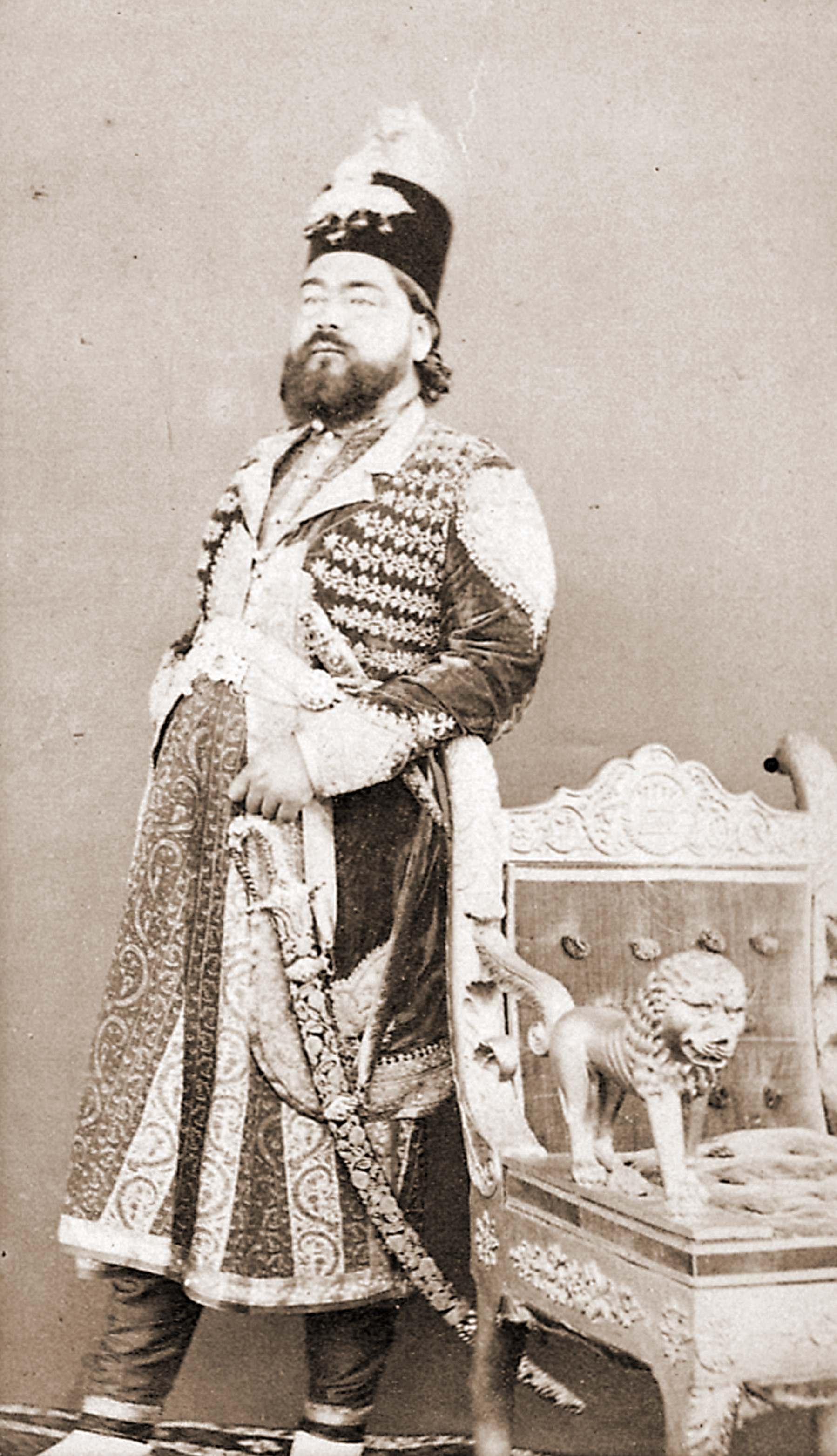

Rampur
- Reign: 1865-1887
- Predecessor: Nawab Muhammad Yusef Ali Khan Bahadur
- Successor: Nawab Muhammad Mushtaq Ali Khan Bahadur

Chief of the Rohilla
- Reign: 1865-1887
- Predecessor: Nawab Muhammad Yusef Ali Khan
- Successor: Nawab Mushtaq Ali Khan
- Born: 1834; Aonla
- Died: 23 March 1887 (aged 52–53); Qila-E-Mualla, Rampur
- Burial: Mausoleum of Hafiz Jamalullah
Names
- Nawab Kalb E Ali Khan Bahadur Rohilla
Regnal name
- His Highness, ‘Ali Jah, Farzand-i-Dilpazir-i-Daulat-i-Inglishia, Mukhlis ud-Daula, Nasir ul-Mulk, Amir ul-Umara, Haji Nawab Sir Muhammad Kalb-i-‘Ali Khan Bahadur, Mustaid Jang, Nawab Khuld Ashiyan, Nawab of Rampur, GCSI, CIE
- House: Rohilla (by Adoption)
- Father: Nawab Muhammad Yusef Ali Khan
- Mother: Nawab Firuz Un Nisa Begum Sahiba
- Religion: Islam

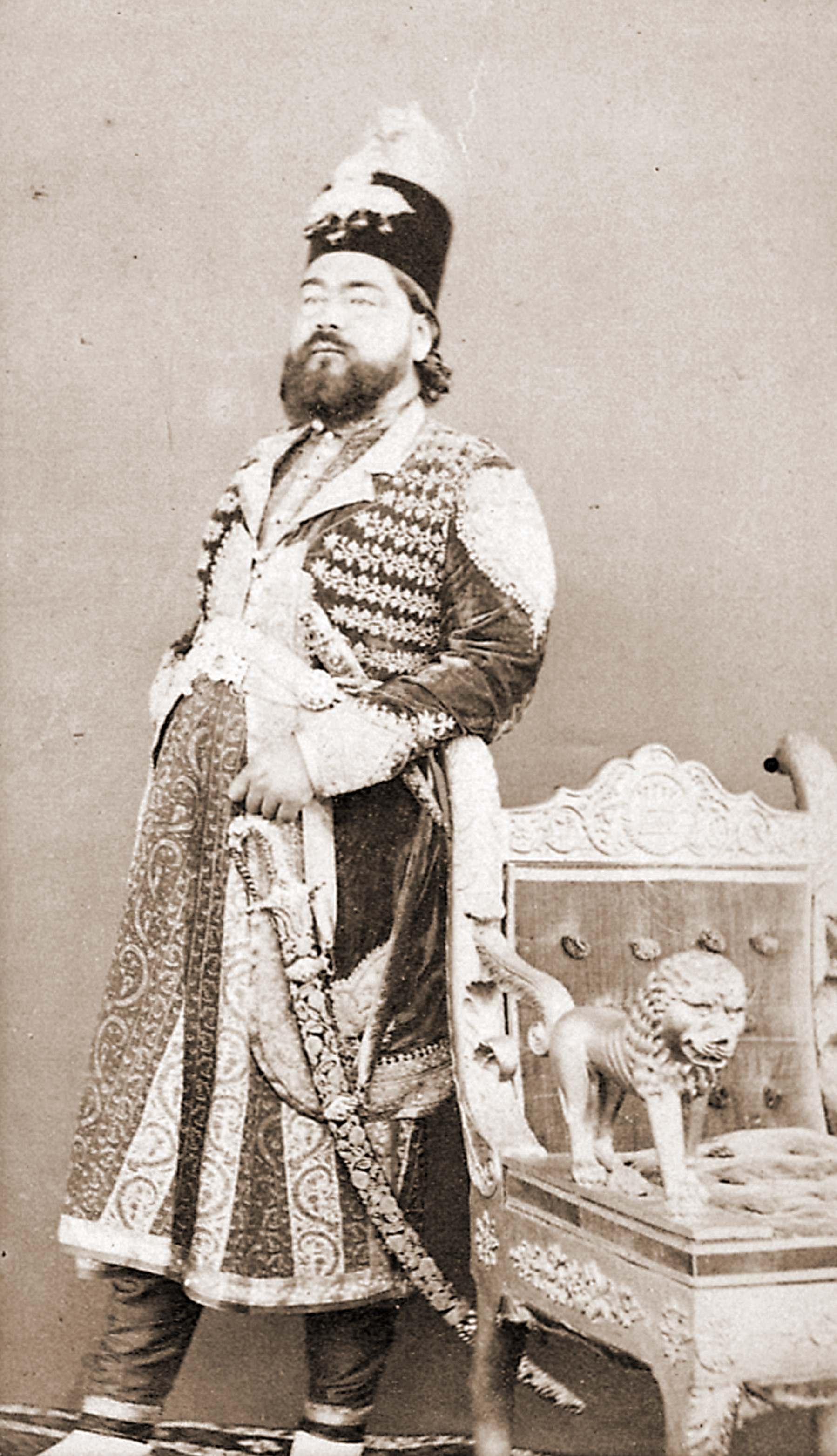
Sir Kalb Ali Khan, Nawab of Rampur.

Hajji Nawab Kalb Ali Khan Bahadur (1832 – 23 March 1887) was a Nawab of the princely state of Rampur from 1865 to 1887. Succeeding his father, Sir Nawab Yusef Ali Khan Bahadur, he continued his father's good works, expanding the Rampur library, constructing the Jama Masjid costing Rs.3 lakhs and encouraging the spread of education, irrigation, architecture, literature and art in general. A gifted ruler, Sir Kalb Ali Khan was highly literate in Arabic and Persian and patronised scholars from across India and the Islamic world. He was a member of John Lawrence's governance council from 1878 to his death, attended the Delhi Durbar of Queen Victoria and was granted a personal salute of 17-guns.

He was also an Urdu-language writer and essayist and poet of ghazals.

He was succeeded at his death in 1887, aged 55, by his son, Muhammad Mushtaq Ali Khan Bahadur.

== Honours ==
- Knight Grand Commander of the Order of the Star of India (GCSI)-1875
- Prince of Wales's Gold Medal-1875
- Empress of India Medal in Gold-1877
- Companion of the Order of the Indian Empire (CIE)-1878

Kalb Ali Khan Rohilla Dynasty Born: 1834 Died: 23 March 1887
Regnal titles
Preceded by Yusef Ali Khan Bahadur	Nawab of Rampur; 1865-1887	Succeeded by Muhammad Mushtaq Ali Khan Bahadur
