= Kasturchand =

Kasturchand may refer to:

- Kasturchand Daga (1855–1917), Indian businessman
- Kasturchand Park metro station, railway station in India
