= KIH =

KIH may refer to:

- Kish International Airport, on Kish Island, Iran, Persian Gulf
- House of Yi (Korean Imperial Household), a Korean clan
- KIH Medal or Empress of India Medal, a commemorative medal awarded to mark the occasion of the proclamation of Queen Victoria as Empress of India in 1877
- Kaisar-i-Hind Medal, a medal awarded by the Emperor or Empress of India between 1900 and 1947 for public service
