= Murtaza Ali Khan =

- Nawab of Rampur

Nawab of Rampur
- Reign: 1966-1971
- Predecessor: Raza Ali Khan
- Successor: titles abolished by the 26th amendment to the constitution
- Born: 22 November 1926; Rafat Mahal, Khasbagh Palace, Rampur
- Died: 29 January 1982 (aged 55)

Nawab Murtaza Ali Khan Bahadur, MBE, NH, NI (22 November 1926 – 29 January 1982) was the titular Nawab of Rampur from 1966 to his death in 1982, succeeding his father, Nawab Raza Ali Khan Bahadur.

== Early life ==
Sayyid Murtaza Ali Khan Bahadur was born on 22 November 1926 at the Rafat Mahal, Khasbagh Palace in Rampur, the eldest son of Shia Nawabzada (Crown Prince) Raza Ali Khan Bahadur. At the time, Murtaza's grandfather Hamid Ali Khan Bahadur was the Nawab. Upon his grandfather's death in 1930, Murtaza's father became Nawab of Rampur and Murtaza became the heir apparent. He was educated at the Doon School in Dehradun, then at Wellington College in Britain and at St.Stephen's College in New Delhi. In 1943, Murtaza was commissioned into the British Indian Army and served as an aide-de-camp to the Commander-in-Chief, India, General (later Field-Marshal) Sir Claude Auchinleck. He was promoted to Captain in 1946 and in that year was made the Brigadier of the Rampur State Forces. Also that year, Murtaza was appointed an MBE.

From 1946 until Independence, Murtaza served as the Minister of the Army for Rampur State and as the Minister for the Household, Education and Public Works until 1949, when Rampur State formally merged with the Dominion of India.

== Titular Nawab of Rampur ==
Following the death of his father in 1966, Murtaza succeeded as titular Nawab of Rampur. The Indian government recognised Murtaza Ali Khan as his father's sole inheritor, triggering a 50-year court battle with his siblings.

From 1969 until 1971, he served as a member in the Uttar Pradesh legislative assembly, as well as an MP in the Lok Sabha. It is an interesting historical fact that Murtaza Ali contested an election from Rampur opposite his own mother Rafat Jamani Begum in 1972 and won. In 1971, the Indira Gandhi regime stripped Nawab Murtaza and his fellow former rulers of what little rights they had left, formally ending Nawab Murtaza's standing as a monarch.

== Personal life ==
In 1946, Nawab Murtaza married Sakina uz-Zamani (11 September 1928 – 3 August 1994), the daughter of a minor chieftain of Pirpur. The couple had a son and a daughter.

Nawab Mohammed Ali Khan (born 20 August 1948) is the eldest son of the late Nawab Murtaza. He has since married and has produced two heirs, which consist of a son and a daughter, namely Nawabzadi Zahra Ali Khan (born 5 August 2000) and Nawabzada Akbar Ali Khan (born 30 November 2001).

== Last years ==
From 1966 to 1975, Nawab Murtaza served as President of the Raza Rampur Library Trust. He became a vice-chairman on its board of trustees in 1975 and remained in that capacity until his death on 29 January 1982 after a 16-year reign, aged 56.

== Awards and honours ==
(ribbon bar, as it would look today)

- Order of Hamid of Rampur (Nishan-e-Hamidiya), 1st Class
- Order of Good Fortune of Rampur (Nishan-e-Iqbal), 1st Class
- 1939–1945 Star-1945
- War Medal 1939–1945–1945
- India Service Medal-1945
- Member of the Order of the British Empire (MBE)-1946

Murtaza Ali Khan Rohilla Dynasty Born: 22 November 1926 Died: 29 January 1982
Titles in pretence
Preceded by Raza Ali Khan Bahadur	— TITULAR — Nawab of Rampur; 1966-1982; Reason for succession failure: Monarchy abolished in 1949	Succeeded by Zulfikar Ali Khan Bahadur
