= Farzand-i-Khas-i-Daulat-i-Inglishia =

Indian princely title

Farzand-i-Khas-i-Daulat-i-Inglishia (lit. 'Favourite son of the English Government') was a title in the Indian subcontinent. It was used by the Maharajas of Baroda and Patiala.

== History ==
Narinder Singh, the Maharaja of Patiala, for his conspicuous service to the East India Company during the rebellion of 1857, was first granted the title of Farzand-i-Khas on 2 June 1858, to which the words Daulat-i-Inglishia were added by the British on 14 January 1860. When the Delhi Durbar was held on 1 January 1877 to proclaim Victoria the Empress of India, Sayajirao Gaekwad III, the Maharaja of Baroda, who was attending it, was conferred this title there. He was granted the sanad confirming this by Lord Lytton, the then Viceroy and Governor-General of India, on 21 July 1887.

== See also ==
- Farzand-i-Dilband Rasikh-al-Iqtidad-i-Daulat-i-Inglishia
- Farzand-i-Saadat-i-Nishan-i-Hazrat-i-Kaiser-i-Hind
- Farzand-i-Dilpazir-i-Daulat-i-Inglishia
