= Raza Ali Khan of Rampur =

Nawab Raza Ali Khan of Rampur
- Nawab of Rampur; Chief Of The Rohilla Major-General, His Highness,‘Ali Jah, Farzand-i-Dilpazir-i-Daulat-i-Inglishia, Mukhlis ud-Daula, Nasir ul-Mulk, Amir ul-Umara, Mustaid Jang
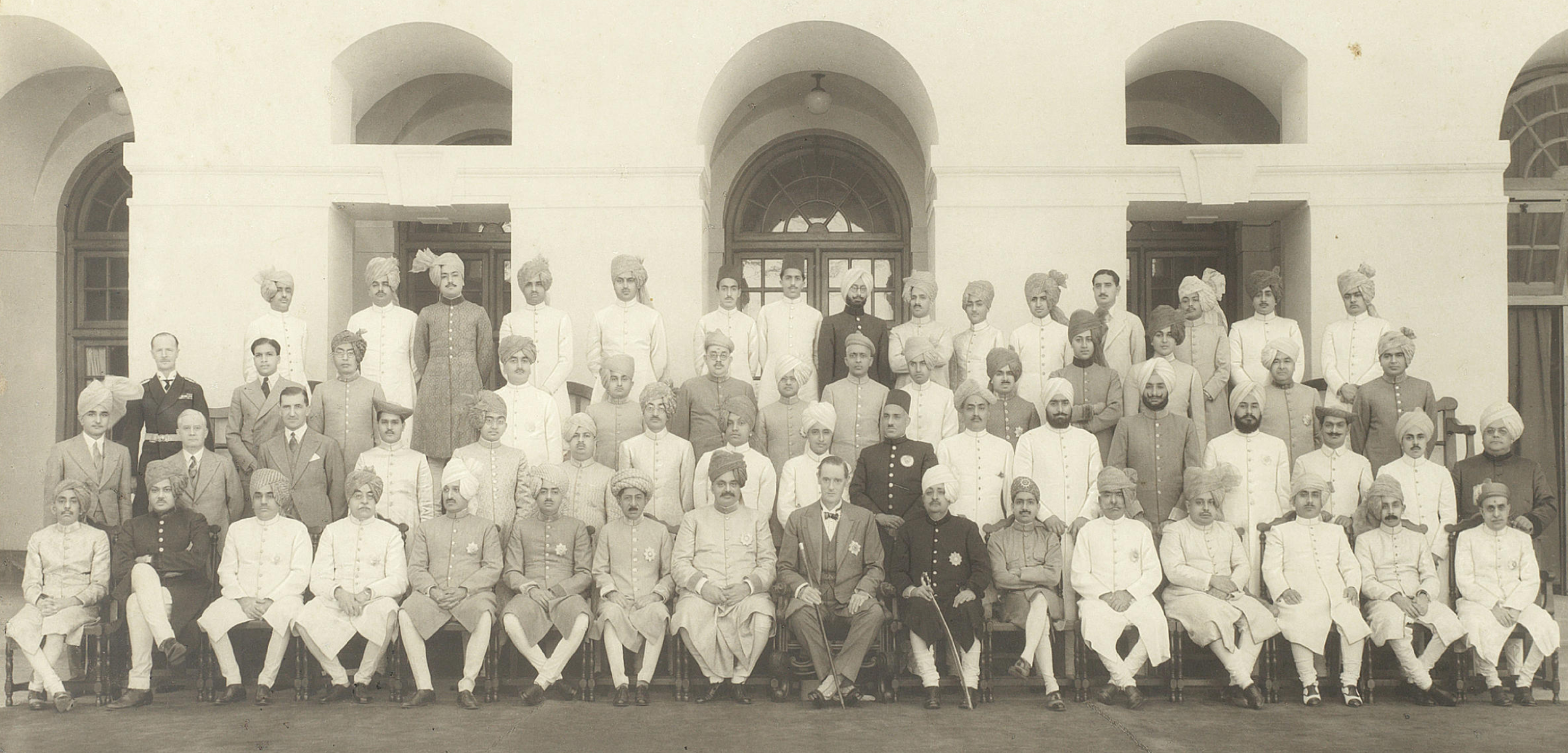
- Nawab Raza Ali Khan at the Chamber of Princes, 1941. He was seen standing in the middle of the 2nd row, 9th from the right (in white sherwani and white turban).

Nawab of Rampur
- Reign: 1930-1956
- Predecessor: Nawab Hamid Ali Khan
- Successor: Nawab Murtaza Ali Khan (titular)

Chief Of The Rohilla
- Reign: 1930-1966
- Predecessor: Nawab Hamid Ali Khan
- Successor: Nawab Murtaza Ali Khan
- Born: 17 November 1908; Qila-i-Mualla, Rampur, British Indian Empire
- Died: 6 March 1966 (aged 57); Khas Bagh Palace, Rampur, Uttar Pradesh, India
- Burial: Karbala, Iraq
Names
- Nawab Sayyid Muhammad Raza Ali Khan Bahadur Rohilla
Regnal name
- Major-General H.H. ‘Ali Jah, Farzand-i-Dilpazir-i-Daulat-i-Inglishia, Mukhlis ud-Daula, Nasir ul-Mulk, Amir ul-Umara, Nawab Syed Sir Muhammad Raza ‘Ali Khan Bahadur, Mustaid Jang, Nawab of Rampur, GCIE, KCSI, NH, NI.
- House: Rohilla (by Adoption, originally Nain Jat); Barha (claimed)
- Father: Hamid Ali Khan I of Rampur
- Mother: Her Highness, Nawab Hazur Aliyah Begum
- Religion: Shia Islam

Sir Raza Ali Khan Bahadur GCIE, KCSI, NH, NI (17 November 1908 – 6 March 1966) was a nawab of the princely state of Rampur from 1930 to 1966.

A tolerant and progressive ruler, Sir Raza expanded the number of Hindus in his government Including his Prime Minister Lt. Col. Horilal Varma Bar At Law and, expanded the irrigation system, completed electrification projects and continued building schools, roads and sewage systems. Also the Nawab sent his soldiers to fight in the Middle Eastern theatres of the Second World War. Acceding to the Union of India on 15 August 1947, Rampur was formally merged with it in 1949 and with the new state of Uttar Pradesh in 1950. Afterwards, Sir Raza devoted himself to charitable projects and to his post as head of the Freemasons in India as the first Grand Master of the Grand Lodge of India.

He was also an Urdu-language writer and translator on subjects of his princely state, religion and administration. His poems and songs in Braj Bhasha about the festival of Holi are still sung in the region.

Sir Raza died in 1966, aged 57, and like his father, was buried at Karbala, Iraq. He was succeeded by his eldest son, Murtaza Ali Khan Bahadur.

== Titles ==
- 1908-1930: Nawabzada Muhammad Raza Ali Khan, Wali Ahad Bahadur
- 1930-1932: His Highness 'Ali Jah, Farzand-i-Dilpazir-i- Daulat-i-Inglishia, Mukhlis ud-Daula, Nasir ul-Mulk, Amir ul-Umara, Nawab Sayyid Muhammad Raza 'Ali Khan Bahadur, Mustaid Jang, Nawab of Rampur
- 1932-1934: Lieutenant His Highness 'Ali Jah, Farzand-i-Dilpazir-i- Daulat-i-Inglishia, Mukhlis ud-Daula, Nasir ul-Mulk, Amir ul-Umara, Nawab Sayyid Muhammad Raza 'Ali Khan Bahadur, Mustaid Jang, Nawab of Rampur
- 1934-1936: Captain His Highness 'Ali Jah, Farzand-i-Dilpazir-i- Daulat-i-Inglishia, Mukhlis ud-Daula, Nasir ul-Mulk, Amir ul-Umara, Nawab Sayyid Muhammad Raza 'Ali Khan Bahadur, Mustaid Jang, Nawab of Rampur
- 1936-1942: Captain His Highness 'Ali Jah, Farzand-i-Dilpazir-i- Daulat-i-Inglishia, Mukhlis ud-Daula, Nasir ul-Mulk, Amir ul-Umara, Nawab Sayyid Sir Muhammad Raza 'Ali Khan Bahadur, Mustaid Jang, Nawab of Rampur, KCSI
- 1942-1944: Major His Highness 'Ali Jah, Farzand-i-Dilpazir-i- Daulat-i-Inglishia, Mukhlis ud-Daula, Nasir ul-Mulk, Amir ul-Umara, Nawab Sayyid Sir Muhammad Raza 'Ali Khan Bahadur, Mustaid Jang, Nawab of Rampur, KCSI
- 1944-1946: Lieutenant-Colonel His Highness 'Ali Jah, Farzand-i-Dilpazir-i- Daulat-i-Inglishia, Mukhlis ud-Daula, Nasir ul-Mulk, Amir ul-Umara, Nawab Sayyid Sir Muhammad Raza 'Ali Khan Bahadur, Mustaid Jang, Nawab of Rampur, GCIE, KCSI
- 1946-1961: Major-General His Highness 'Ali Jah, Farzand-i-Dilpazir-i- Daulat-i-Inglishia, Mukhlis ud-Daula, Nasir ul-Mulk, Amir ul-Umara, Nawab Sayyid Sir Muhammad Raza 'Ali Khan Bahadur, Mustaid Jang, Nawab of Rampur, GCIE, KCSI
- 1961-1966: Major-General His Highness 'Ali Jah, Farzand-i-Dilpazir-i- Daulat-i-Inglishia, Mukhlis ud-Daula, Nasir ul-Mulk, Amir ul-Umara, Nawab Sayyid Sir Muhammad Raza 'Ali Khan Bahadur, Mustaid Jang, Nawab of Rampur, GCIE, KCSI, Most Worshipful the Grand Master of the Grand Lodge of the Ancient, Free & Accepted Masons of India

== Honours ==
(ribbon bar, as it would look today)

- Nishan-i-Hamidia (NH), 1st Class (Royal House of Rampur)
- Nishan-i-Iqbal (NI), 1st Class (Royal House of Rampur)
- King George V Silver Jubilee Medal, 1935
- Knight Commander of the Order of the Star of India (KCSI), 1936
- King George VI Coronation Medal, 1937
- Knight Grand Commander of the Order of the Indian Empire (GCIE), 1944
- Indian Independence Medal, 1947
- Queen Elizabeth II Coronation Medal, 1953

Raza Ali Khan of Rampur Rohilla Dynasty Born: 17 November 1908 Died: 6 March 1966
Regnal titles
| Preceded by Hamid Ali Khan Bahadur | Nawab of Rampur; 1930-1949 | Succeeded by Monarchy abolished (Merge within the Dominion of India) |
Titles in pretence
| Preceded by None; monarchy abolished in 1949 | — TITULAR — Nawab of Rampur; 1949-1966; Reason for succession failure: Monarchy abolished in 1949 | Succeeded by Murtaza Ali Khan Bahadur |
