= Muhammad Said Khan =

Nawab Muhammad Said Khan Bahadur Of Rampur
- Nawab of Rampur; Chief Of The Rohilla
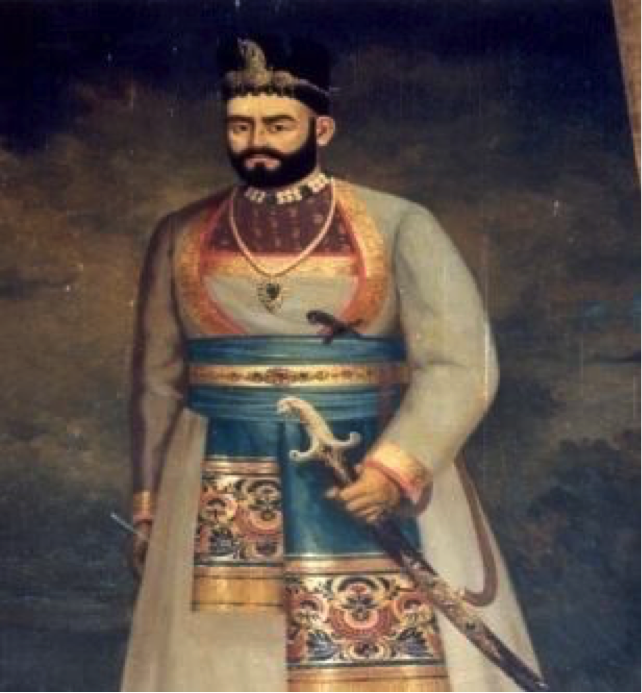
- Nawab Muhammad Said Khan of Rampur

Rampur
- Reign: 1840-1855
- Predecessor: Nawab Ahmad Ali Khan Bahadur of Rampur
- Successor: Nawab Yusef Ali Khan Bahadur of Rampur

Chief Of The Rohilla
- Reign: 1840-1855
- Predecessor: Nawab Ahmad Ali Khan Bahadur of Rampur
- Successor: Nawab Yusef Ali Khan Bahadur of Rampur
- Born: 19 May 1786
- Died: 1 April 1855 (aged 68); Macchi Bhawan, Qila-E-Mualla, Rampur
- Burial: Qilla-E-Mualla Imambara
Names
- Nawab Muhammad Said Khan Bahadur Rohilla
Regnal name
- Nawab Muhammad Said Khan Bahadur, Nawab of Rampur.
- House: Rohilla (by Adoption)
- Father: Nawab Ghulam Muhammad Khan of Rampur
- Religion: Islam

Nawab Muhammad Said Khan Bahadur (19 May 1786 – 1 April 1855) was Nawab of Rampur from 1840 to 1855, succeeding his cousin Ahmad Ali Khan Bahadur. The son of Ghulam Muhammad Khan Bahadur, Muhammad Said spent his early years in the service of the East India Company, eventually rising to the rank of Deputy Collector for Dudain. Although his father had been a tyrant during his brief reign, Muhammad Said by contrast proved to be a benevolent and progressive ruler, building irrigation works and establishing courts of law and an advanced legal code. Muhammad Said died on 1 April 1855 in his 69th year and was buried at Rampur. He was succeeded by his eldest son, Yusef Ali Khan Bahadur.

== Reign ==
During his reign, Muhammad Said Khan further organised the Rampur Library. He appointed Allam Yusuf Ali Khan Mehvi into a famous Kutub Khana. He invited accomplished calligraphers, illuminators and binders from Kashmir and other parts of India.And prepared a seal with the following Persian inscription:

Hast in muhr bar kutub khana
Wali-i-Rampur Farzana
AH 1268 (1852 A.D)

== Cultural Depictions ==
Nawab Sayyid Muhammad Said Khan Bahadur Rohilla of Rampur
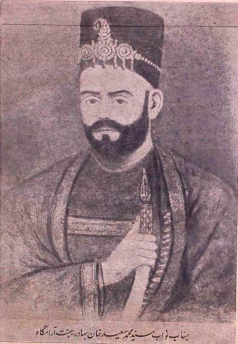
Black and white portrait

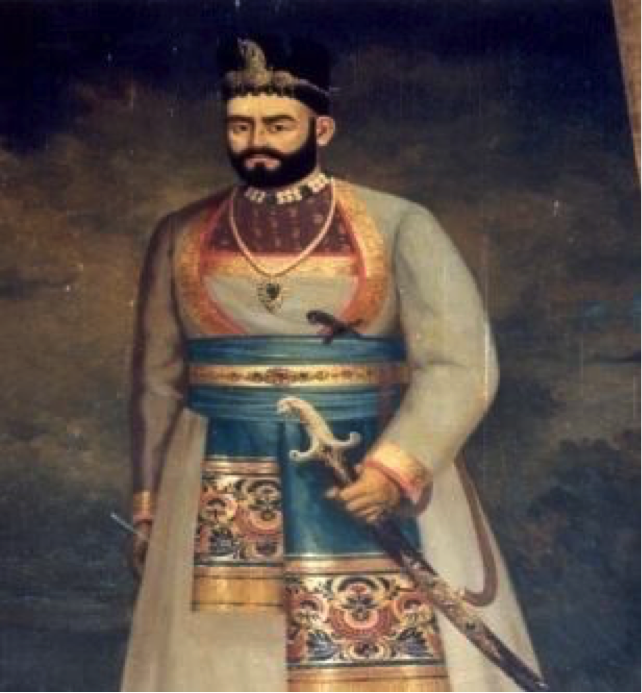
Colour portrait of Nawab Sayyid Muhammad Saeed Khan Bahadur Rohilla of Rampur

Muhammad Said Khan Rohilla Dynasty Born: 19 May 1786 Died: 1 April 1855
Regnal titles
Preceded by Ahmad Ali Khan Bahadur	Nawab of Rampur; 1840-1855	Succeeded by Yusef Ali Khan Bahadur
