= Empress of India Medal =

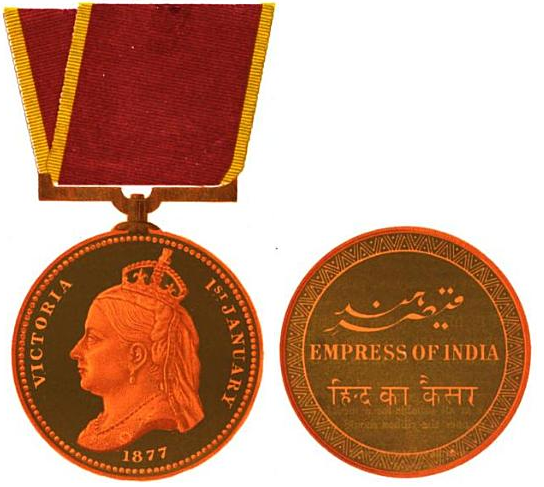
- Obverse and reverse of the Empress of India Medal
- Type: Commemorative medal
- Awarded for: Commemorate the proclamation of Queen Victoria as Empress of India
- Presented by: Queen Victoria
- Established: 1 January 1877
- Ribbon bar of the medal

The Empress of India Medal, also referred to as KIH Medal, was a commemorative medal awarded to mark the occasion of the proclamation of Queen Victoria as Empress of India in 1877. It was the first wearable medal issued to mark a commemorative occasion within the British Empire. The medal was awarded in gold to Indian princes and senior officials and in silver to selected British and Indian military officers and civilians, as well as one soldier from each British and Indian regiment serving in India at the time of the proclamation celebrations of the 1877 Delhi Durbar.

== History ==
The first official medals to commemorate the coronation of a British sovereign were distributed in 1547, marking the coronation of King Edward VI. These medals were medallions or commemorative coins, not intended for wear. The first official medal, commemorating a royal occasion, which could be worn, was the Empress of India Medal. This medal marked the occasion of the proclamation at the Delhi Durbar of Queen Victoria as Empress of India on 1 January 1877.

== Appearance ==
The medal was made in both gold and silver. It measures 58 millimetres (2.3 in) in diameter, nearly 20 mm more than a campaign medal.
The obverse of the medal depicts the diademed effigy of Queen Victoria, wearing a veil which falls over the back of the head and neck. Around the beaded edge of the medal is inscribed Victoria 1st January 1877.
The reverse bears the inscription Empress of India in English, Hind-ka-Kesar in Hindustani, and Qaisar-e-Hind in Persian. Around the edge is a repeating decorative design.
It was issued unnamed, although some medals were later engraved privately.

It was worn on a 42 millimetres (1.7 in) ribbon around the neck. The ribbon is crimson, with thin yellow stripes at the edges.

== Award criteria ==
The medal was awarded in gold to Indian princes and senior officials, and in silver to selected British and Indian officers and civilians, as well as a selected soldier from each British and Indian regiment serving in India at the time. The medal was not permitted to be worn by officers and soldiers of the British and Indian armies in uniform, although it was frequently worn by Indian princes and civilians.

== Award ceremony ==
During the Durbar proclaiming Victoria Empress of India, the Viceroy, arrayed in the robes of the Grand Master of the Order of the Star of India, received each of the 63 ruling princes of India in turn, he:

... placed round the prince's neck a crimson ribbon, to which was attached a very handsome gold medal with the Queen's head engraved on it, adding: 'I decorate you, by command of Her Majesty. May this medal be long worn by yourself, and long kept as an heirloom in your family in remembrance of the auspicious date it bears'.

== Recipients ==
- Farzand Ali Khan of Jahangirabad Raj
- Jung Bahadur Rana
- Vijaya Mohana Muktamba Bai
- Sultan Jahan, Begum of Bhopal
- Seth Baldeo Dass Sarda of Punjab
- Bhagvatsinhji
- Sayajirao Gaekwad III
- Raghubir Singh Jind
- Kasturchand Daga
- Kalb Ali Khan
- Mahboob Ali Khan
- Muhammad Mushtaq Ali Khan
- Khengarji III
- Ranodip Singh Kunwar
- Hira Singh Nabha
- Nripendra Narayan
- Ramachandra Tondaiman
- Chandra Shumsher Jang Bahadur Rana
- Jayajirao Scindia
- Shivaji VI
- Pratap Singh of Jammu and Kashmir
- Jaswant Singh of Bharatpur
- Lakshmeshwar Singh
- Rameshwar Singh
- Ranbir Singh of Jammu and Kashmir
- Shah Jahan Begum
- Visakham Thirunal
- Ayilyam Thirunal
