= William Peyton =

British general (1866–1931)

General Sir William Peyton KCB KCVO DSO
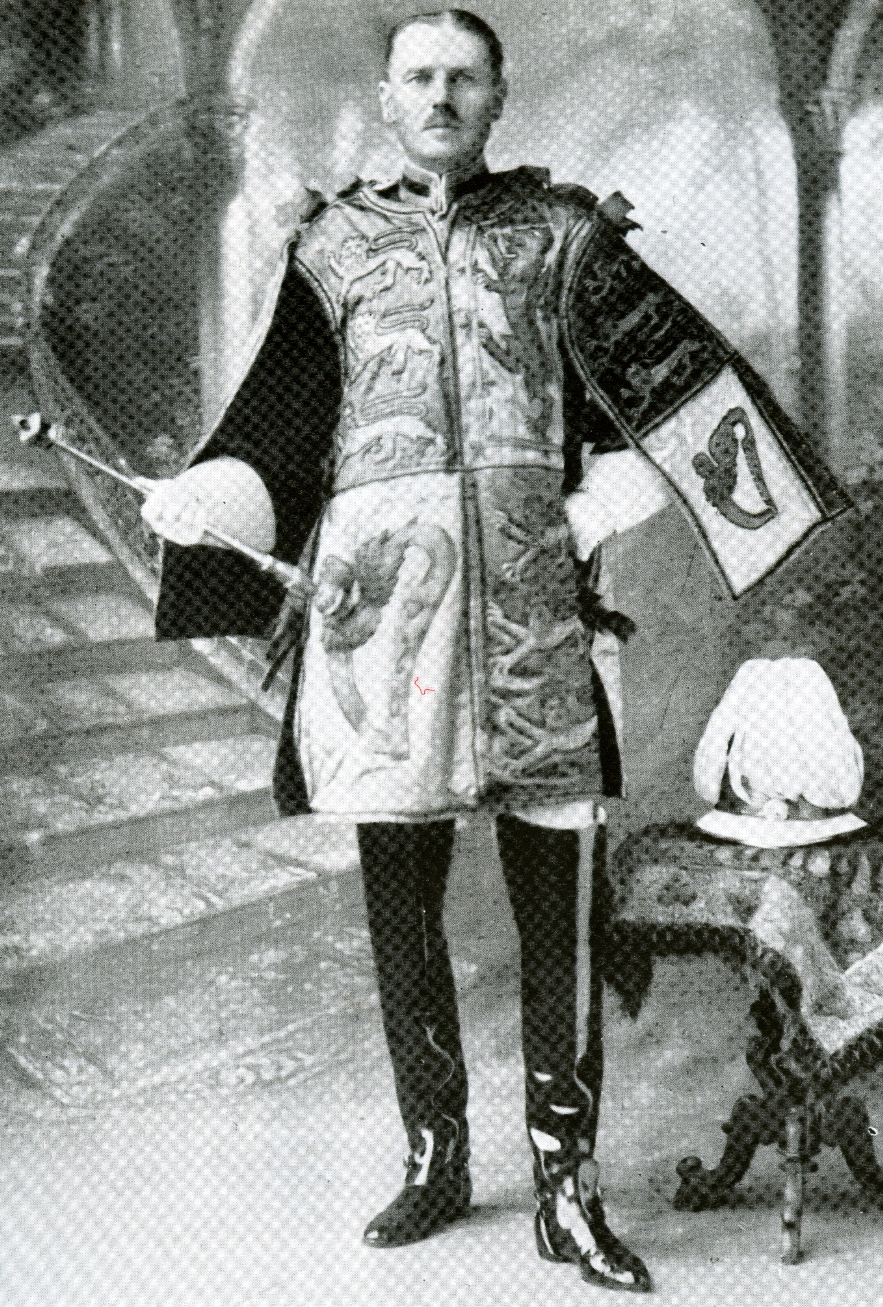
- William Peyton as Delhi Herald Extraordinary in 1911
- Born: 7 May 1866; Wellington, Tamil Nadu, Madras, British India
- Died: 14 November 1931 (aged 65); Army and Navy Club, London
- Military career
- Allegiance: United Kingdom
- Branch: British Army
- Service years: 1885–1930
- Rank: General
- Commands: Scottish Command (1926–1930); 3rd Indian Division (1920–1922); 40th Infantry Division (1918–1919); X Corps (1918); Reserve Army (1918); Western Frontier Force in Egypt (1916); 2nd Mounted Division (1914–1915); Meerut Cavalry Brigade (1908–1912); 15th Hussars (1903–1907)
- Conflicts: Mahdist War; Second Boer War; First World War
- Awards: Knight Commander of the Order of the Bath; Knight Commander of the Royal Victorian Order; Distinguished Service Order; Mentioned in Despatches (6)

General Sir William Eliot Peyton, KCB, KCVO, DSO (7 May 1866 – 14 November 1931) was a British Army officer who served as Military Secretary to the British Expeditionary Force from 1916 to 1918. He was Delhi Herald of Arms Extraordinary at the time of the Delhi Durbar of 1911.

== Early life ==
The third son of Colonel John Peyton, commanding officer of the 7th Dragoon Guards, Peyton was educated at Brighton College.

== Early military career ==
In 1885, Peyton enlisted in the ranks in the 7th Dragoon Guards, a regiment that his father had commanded between 1871 and 1876. The explanation of this was his failure to pass the entrance examination of the Royal Military College, Sandhurst. Having risen to sergeant, Peyton was commissioned as a second lieutenant in the 7th Dragoon Guards on 18 June 1887, and promoted lieutenant in 1890. He was appointed regimental adjutant in 1892. In 1896 he transferred to the 15th Hussars and was promoted captain.

He was seconded to the Egyptian Army and saw service with the Dongola Expeditionary Force in 1896, and was mentioned in despatches, then in the Sudan in 1897 and 1898, where he was dangerously wounded and his horse killed under him by a spear. In the Sudan he was again mentioned in despatches, and received the Distinguished Service Order. He was also awarded the Order of the Medjidieh, Fourth Class.

Peyton fought next in South Africa, 1899–1900, where he served with Alexander Thorneycroft's mounted infantry, was promoted major and brevet lieutenant colonel, again mentioned in despatches, and received the Queen's South Africa Medal with three clasps, but his service was cut short by illness and he was invalided back to England. He passed the army's Staff College in December 1901.

In October 1903 Peyton took command of the 15th Hussars, which he commanded for four years, until October 1907 when he was placed on half-pay. He had been granted the brevet rank of colonel in April 1905, while in command of his regiment. In October 1907 he was promoted to colonel and, reverting to normal pay, went to India to become assistant quartermaster general, India, and, as a temporary brigadier general, to command the Meerut Cavalry Brigade from 1908 to 1912.

In India, he served as Delhi Herald of Arms Extraordinary at the Coronation Durbar held on 12 December 1911, and was made a Commander of the Royal Victorian Order, and from July 1912 was military secretary to the Commander-in-Chief, India.

== First World War ==
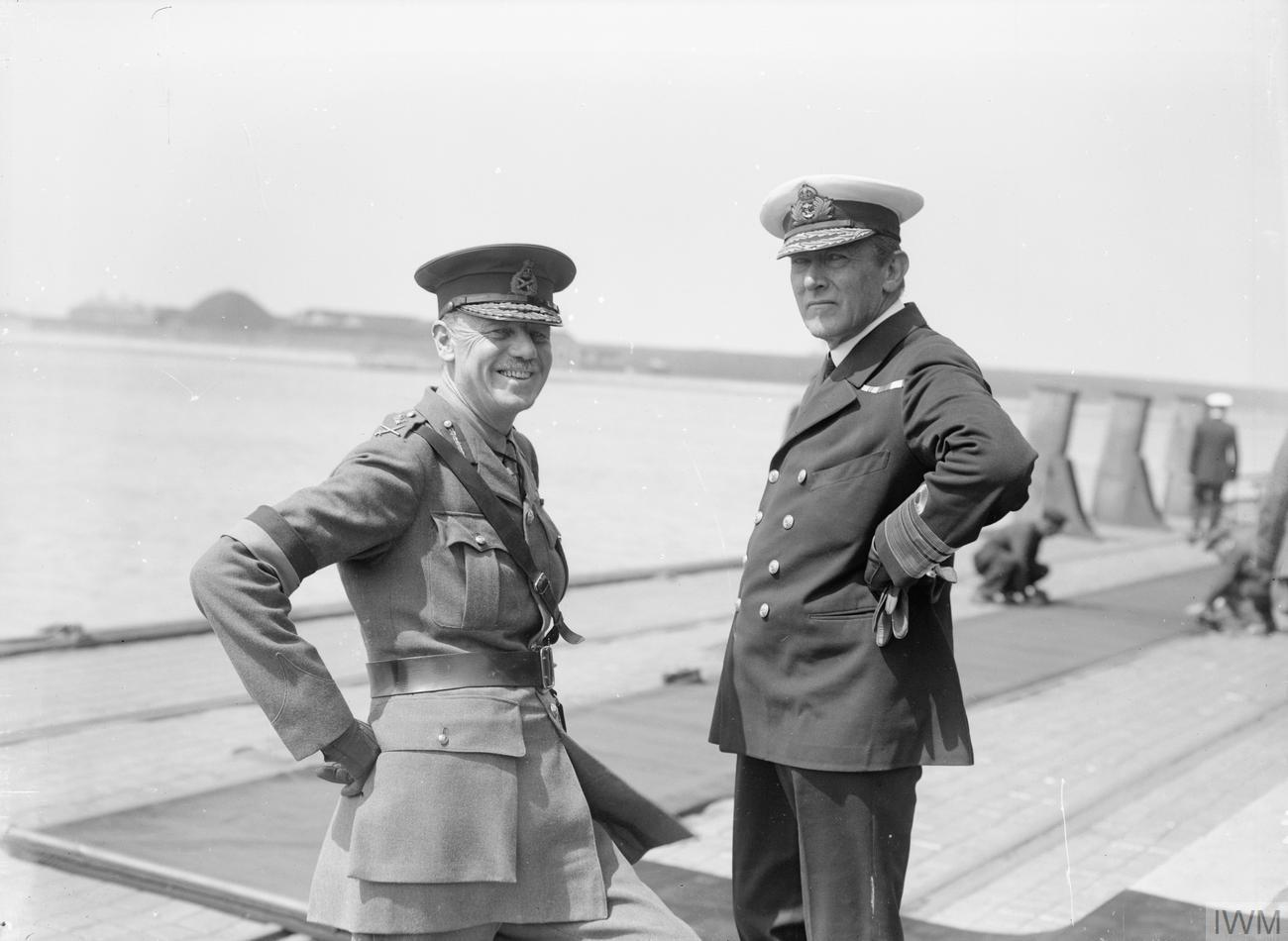
Major General Sir William Peyton and Vice Admiral Sir Reginald Bacon waiting on the quayside at Calais for the arrival of King George V and Queen Mary, June 1917.

Peyton returned to England in 1914 on the outbreak of the First World War and took up a new post as GSO1 of the 1st Mounted Division, a Territorial Force (TF) formation. Promoted to major general in 1914 (first as temporary promotion, from October as substantive rank), he became general officer commanding (GOC) of the 2nd Mounted Division, another TF formation, which he led in the Gallipoli campaign, seeing action in August 1915 and later taking part in the final evacuation of Allied forces from Gallipoli on 19 December 1915. The division suffered severe casualties at Suvla in particular.

Peyton then commanded the Western Frontier Force in Egypt in 1916, leading an expedition against the Senussi and re-occupying Sidi Barrani and Sollum, again being mentioned in despatches. For rescuing the shipwrecked British prisoners of HMS Tara from Bir Hakkim (by a force of armoured cars led by Hugh Grosvenor, 2nd Duke of Westminster) he received the special thanks of the Admiralty and was again mentioned in despatches.

In May 1916, after success as a combat commander, Peyton was transferred to the Western Front to become the military secretary to General Sir Douglas Haig remaining with Haig, commander-in-chief (C-in-C) of the British Expeditionary Force (BEF) on the Western Front, until March 1918. The post was at the heart of the operation of the management of appointments, promotions, removals, honours and awards of the BEF. In December of that year he was granted the colonelcy of the 15th The King's Hussars, holding the position until their merger with the 19th Hussars in 1922, and thereafter the colonelcy of the combined 15th/19th Hussars until his death.

Peyton was knighted in 1917, being made a Knight Commander of the Royal Victorian Order when King George V visited the troops in the field.

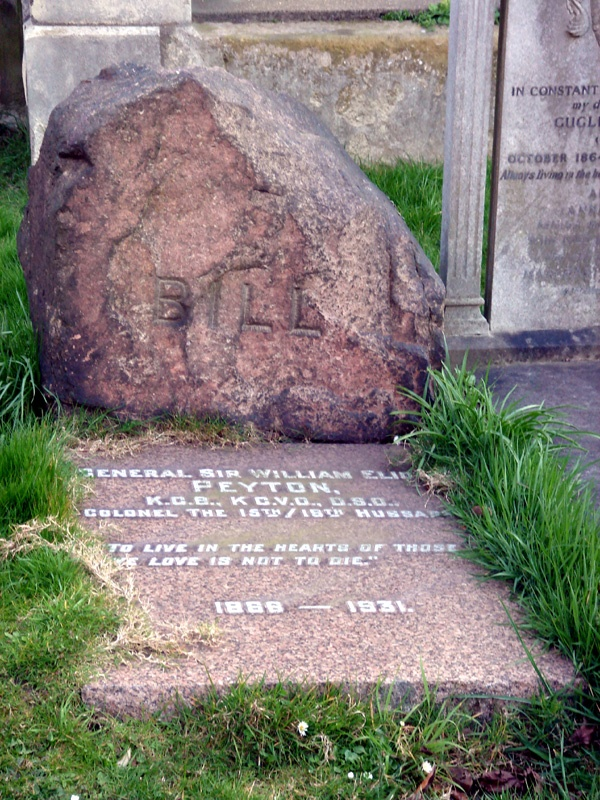
Funerary monument, Brompton Cemetery, London.

In April and May 1918, as the German Spring Offensives were underway, Peyton nominally commanded the Reserve Army of the BEF. The Fifth Army had been defeated on the Somme in March 1918 and taken over by the Fourth Army, and the former Fifth Army staff formed a reserve HQ at Crécy-en-Ponthieu. On 23 May, the Fifth Army was reconstituted and given to General Sir William Birdwood, and for six weeks (as a temporary lieutenant general) Peyton took command of X Corps, though his corps was held back from the fighting.

However, from 4 July 1918, when he gave up his temporary rank, until March 1919, he returned to active service as GOC of the 40th Infantry Division, taking over from Major General John Ponsonby. He led the 40th, one of the most junior of the Kitchener's Army divisions, during operations in France and Belgium, leading it through the Hundred Days advance through Flanders until after the Armistice of 11 November 1918.

Peyton's feelings about his postings between May 1916 and July 1918 were expressed silently by his omitting any mention of them from his entry in Who's Who.

== Post-war and final years ==
Peyton next returned to India, to command the United Province district and the 3rd Indian Division at Meerut between 1920 and 1922. He was promoted substantive lieutenant general in August 1921.

Peyton was next posted as military secretary to the secretary of State for War, from 1922 to 1926, and as general officer commanding-in-chief of Scottish Command, a post he held from February 1926 until he relinquished it in February 1930, during which time he had been to promoted general in June 1927. This was his last post, being placed on half-pay before retirement in June of that year.

A member of the Army and Navy Club, he died there suddenly at the age of 65 on 14 November 1931. He is buried in Brompton Cemetery, London, just to the north-west of the chapel.

He was unusually tall, with a height of six feet, six inches.

== Family ==
On 27 April 1889, Peyton married Mabel Maria, daughter of late Lt-General the Hon. E. T. Gage CB, third son of Henry Gage, 4th Viscount Gage, and of Ella Henrietta Maxse, a granddaughter of the 5th Earl of Berkeley. With Mabel, he had one daughter, Ela Violet Ethel. After his wife's death in 1901, Peyton remarried in 1903 with Gertrude, daughter of Major-General A. R. Lempriere and the widow of Captain Stuart Robertson of the 14th Hussars. They had one son and his second wife died in 1916.

In 1921, Peyton's daughter Ela married Lieutenant-Colonel Sir Edward Daymonde Stevenson KCVO (1895–1958) and she died in 1976, leaving one son. Peyton's son-in-law was Gentleman Usher of the Green Rod, 1953–1958, and Purse Bearer to the Lord High Commissioner to the General Assembly of the Church of Scotland, 1930–1958.

== Freemasonry ==
He was Initiated in Lodge Logonier, No.2436, (England) and was made an Honorary Member of Lodge Holyrood House (St. Luke's), No.44, (Edinburgh) on 24 March 1923. He was the Grand Sword-bearer of the Grand Lodge of Scotland 1927–1928.

== Honours ==
- Mentioned in Despatches, 1896, 1898, 1900, 1915, 1916
- Khedive's Medal with two clasps, 1896
- Distinguished Service Order, 1898
- Order of the Medjidieh, Fourth Class, conferred by the Khedive of Egypt with the authority of the Sultan of Turkey, 1899
- Queen's South Africa Medal with three clasps
- Commander of the Royal Victorian Order, 1911
- Commander of the Legion d'Honneur
- Companion of the Order of the Bath, 1913
- Order of the Nile, 2nd Class, 1916
- Commandeur de l'Ordre de Leopold, 1916
- Colonel of the 15th The King's Hussars, 10 December 1916
- Knight Commander of the Order of the Bath, 1917
- Knight Commander of the Royal Victorian Order, 1917
- Croix de Guerre (Belgium), 1918
- Colonel of the 15th/19th The King's Hussars, 1922
- Honorary Colonel of the Warwickshire Yeomanry, 17 February 1926

Military offices
New command	GOC Reserve Army; April–May 1918	Succeeded by Sir William Birdwood (as GOC Fifth Army)
Preceded by Thomas Morland	GOC X Corps; May–June 1918	Succeeded by Reginald Stephens
Preceded by John Ponsonby	GOC 40th Division; 1918–1919	Post disbanded
Preceded by Sir Alexander Godley	Military Secretary; 1922–1926	Succeeded by Sir David Campbell
Preceded by Sir Walter Braithwaite	GOC-in-C Scottish Command; 1926–1930	Succeeded by Sir Percy Radcliffe
