= Hamid Ali Khan of Rampur =

Nawab Hamid Ali Khan of Rampur
- Nawab of Rampur; Chief of the Rohilla, Major-General, His Highness ‘Ali Jah, Farzand-i-Dilpazir-i-Daulat-i-Inglishia, Mukhlis ud-Daula, Nasir ul-Mulk, Amir ul- Umara
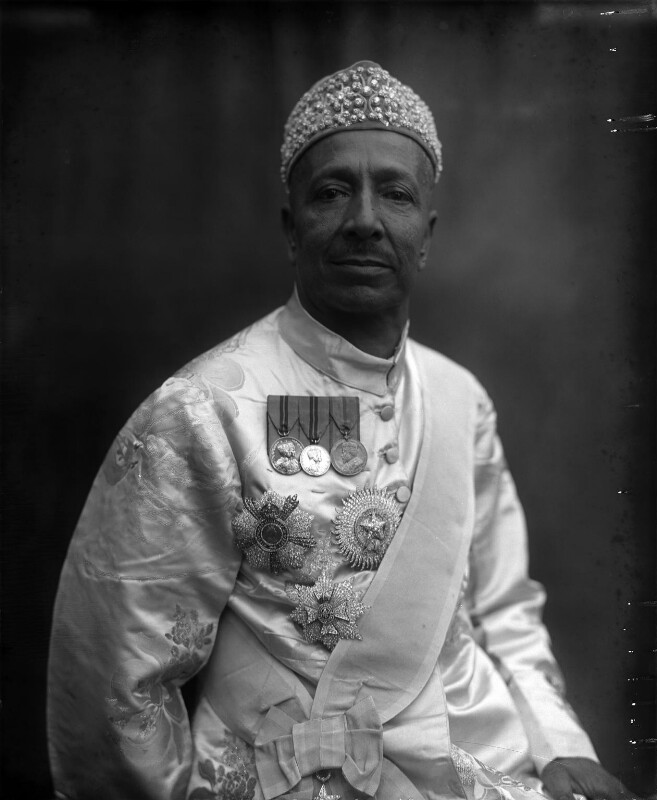
- Khan, 4 April 1927

Nawab of Rampur
- Reign: 1889–1930
- Predecessor: Nawab Mushtaq Ali Khan
- Successor: Nawab Raza Ali Khan

Chief of the Rohilla
- Reign: 1889–1930
- Predecessor: Nawab Mushtaq Ali Khan
- Successor: Nawab Raza Ali Khan
- Born: 31 August 1875; Rampur, British Raj
- Died: 19 June 1930 (aged 54); Hamid Manzil, Rampur, British Raj
- Burial: Karbala, Iraq
Names
- Nawab Sayyid Hamid Ali Khan Bahadur Rohilla
Regnal name
- Major-General, His Highness, ‘Ali Jah, Farzand-i-Dilpazir-i-Daulat-i-Inglishia, Mukhlis ud-Daula, Nasir ul-Mulk, Amir ul- Umara, Nawab Syed Sir Hamid ‘Ali Khan Bahadur, Mustaid Jang, Nawab of Rampur, GCSI, GCIE, GCVO
- House: Rohilla (by Adoption); Barha
- Father: Nawab Mushtaq Ali Khan
- Mother: Nawab Kurshid Jahan Begum Sahiba
- Religion: Shia Islam

Nawab Sayyid Hamid Ali Khan Bahadur GCSI GCVO GCIE (31 August 1875–19 June 1930) was Nawab of the princely state of Rampur from 1889 to 1930.

He was only thirteen (but turning fourteen years of age) when he ascended the throne of Rampur, he ruled under a regency to 1896, when Victor Bruce, 9th Earl of Elgin invested him with full ruling powers. During his reign, his salute was raised from 13-guns to 15 as a result of Sir Hamid's army seeing distinguished service in the Middle East, Afghanistan and German East Africa during World War I. A staunch supporter of higher education, Sir Nawab Hamid gave generously to many colleges across the subcontinent, including the Lucknow Medical College and Aligarh Muslim University, also greatly expanding the number of educational institutions within his state. He was instrumental in foundation of Shia College, Lucknow.

Dying in 1930 at the age of 54, after a 41-year reign, Sir Hamid was buried at Karbala, Iraq. He was succeeded by his son, Sir Raza Ali Khan Bahadur.

== Titles ==
- 1875–1889: Nawabzada Sayyid Hamid Ali Khan Bahadur
- 1889–1895: His Highness 'Ali Jah, Farzand-i-Dilpazir-i- Daulat-i-Inglishia, Mukhlis ud-Daula, Nasir ul-Mulk, Amir ul- Umara, Nawab Sayyid Hamid 'Ali Khan Bahadur, Mustaid Jang, Nawab of Rampur
- 1895–1897: Captain His Highness 'Ali Jah, Farzand-i-Dilpazir-i- Daulat-i-Inglishia, Mukhlis ud-Daula, Nasir ul-Mulk, Amir ul- Umara, Nawab Sayyid Hamid 'Ali Khan Bahadur, Mustaid Jang, Nawab of Rampur
- 1897–1905: Major His Highness 'Ali Jah, Farzand-i-Dilpazir-i- Daulat-i-Inglishia, Mukhlis ud-Daula, Nasir ul-Mulk, Amir ul- Umara, Nawab Sayyid Hamid 'Ali Khan Bahadur, Mustaid Jang, Nawab of Rampur
- 1906–1908: Major His Highness 'Ali Jah, Farzand-i-Dilpazir-i- Daulat-i-Inglishia, Mukhlis ud-Daula, Nasir ul-Mulk, Amir ul- Umara, Nawab Sayyid Sir Hamid 'Ali Khan Bahadur, Mustaid Jang, Nawab of Rampur, GCIE
- 1908–1910: Lieutenant-Colonel His Highness 'Ali Jah, Farzand-i-Dilpazir-i- Daulat-i-Inglishia, Mukhlis ud-Daula, Nasir ul-Mulk, Amir ul- Umara, Nawab Sayyid Sir Hamid 'Ali Khan Bahadur, Mustaid Jang, Nawab of Rampur, GCIE
- 1910–1911: Colonel His Highness 'Ali Jah, Farzand-i-Dilpazir-i- Daulat-i-Inglishia, Mukhlis ud-Daula, Nasir ul-Mulk, Amir ul- Umara, Nawab Sayyid Sir Hamid 'Ali Khan Bahadur, Mustaid Jang, Nawab of Rampur, GCIE
- 1911–1922: Colonel His Highness 'Ali Jah, Farzand-i-Dilpazir-i- Daulat-i-Inglishia, Mukhlis ud-Daula, Nasir ul-Mulk, Amir ul- Umara, Nawab Sayyid Sir Hamid 'Ali Khan Bahadur, Mustaid Jang, Nawab of Rampur, GCIE, GCVO
- 1922–1928: Colonel His Highness 'Ali Jah, Farzand-i-Dilpazir-i- Daulat-i-Inglishia, Mukhlis ud-Daula, Nasir ul-Mulk, Amir ul- Umara, Nawab Sayyid Sir Hamid 'Ali Khan Bahadur, Mustaid Jang, Nawab of Rampur, GCSI, GCIE, GCVO
- 1928–1930: Major-General His Highness 'Ali Jah, Farzand-i-Dilpazir-i- Daulat-i-Inglishia, Mukhlis ud-Daula, Nasir ul-Mulk, Amir ul- Umara, Nawab Sayyid Sir Hamid 'Ali Khan Bahadur, Mustaid Jang, Nawab of Rampur, GCSI, GCIE, GCVO

== Honours ==
(ribbon bar, as it would look today)

- Delhi Durbar Gold Medal-1903
- Knight Grand Commander of the Order of the Indian Empire (GCIE) – 1908
- Delhi Durbar Gold Medal-1911
- Knight Grand Cross of the Royal Victorian Order (GCVO) – 1911
- Knight Grand Commander of the Order of the Star of India (GCSI) – 1921 Birthday Honours

== Footnotes ==
Hamid Ali Khan of Rampur Rohilla Dynasty Born: 31 August 1875 Died: 20 June 1930
Regnal titles
Preceded by Muhammad Mushtaq Ali Khan Bahadur	Nawab of Rampur; 1889–1930	Succeeded by Raza Ali Khan Bahadur
