= Farzand-i-Saadat-i-Nishan-i-Hazrat-i-Kaiser-i-Hind =

Indian princely title

Farzand-i-Saadat-i-Nishan-i-Hazrat-i-Kaiser-i-Hind (lit. 'A son emblematical of the good auspices of Emperor (or Empress) of India') was a title in the Indian subcontinent. It was used by the Raja of Faridkot.

== History ==
During the Second Anglo-Afghan War, Bikram Singh, the Raja of Faridkot, supported the British cause. He aided the British by providing them a contingent of 250 horse and foot soldiers. His troops were employed in the Kurram Valley. In appreciation of this, the British Government conferred upon him this title on 1 January 1879 as a hereditary distinction.

== See also ==
- Farzand-i-Khas-i-Daulat-i-Inglishia
- Farzand-i-Dilband Rasikh-al-Iqtidad-i-Daulat-i-Inglishia
- Farzand-i-Dilpazir-i-Daulat-i-Inglishia
