= Fifth Army (United Kingdom) =

Field army of the British Army during WWI

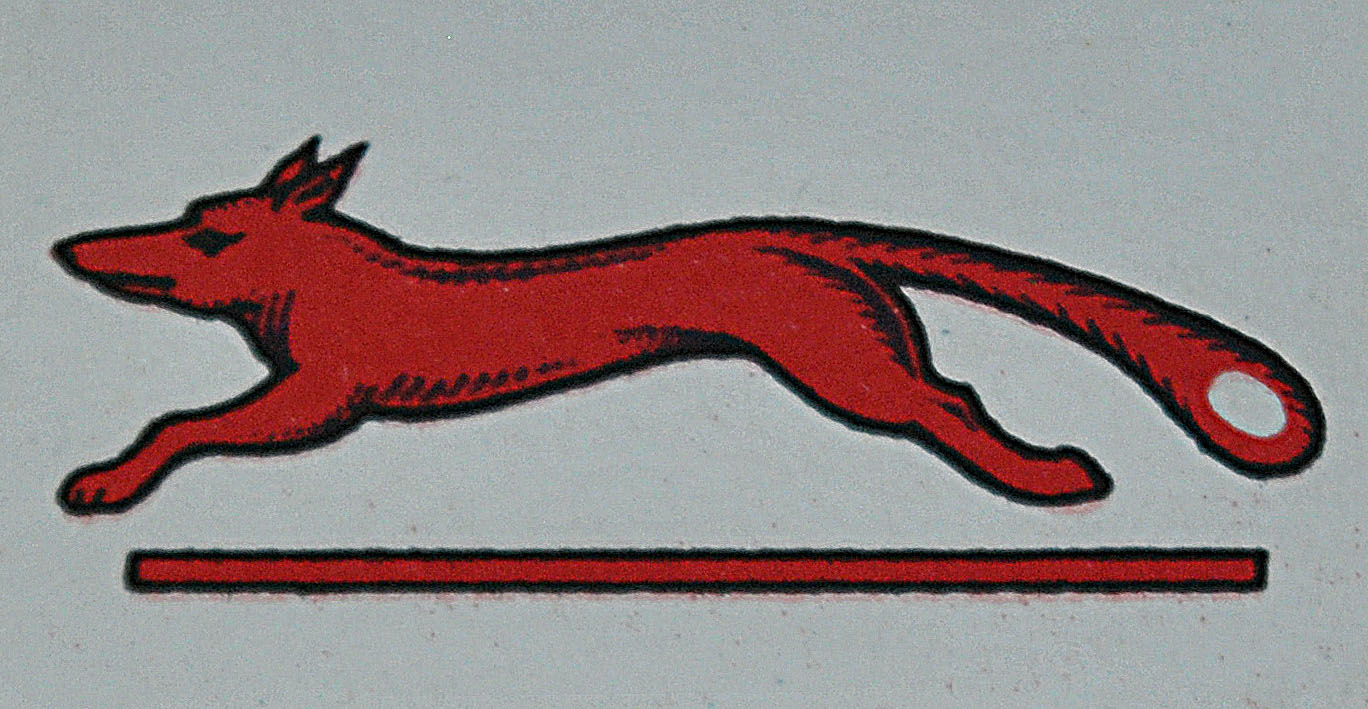
- 5th Army formation sign; first (left) and second (right) patterns.
- Active: 1916–1918
- Country: United Kingdom
- Branch: British Army
- Type: Army
- Role: Operations on the Western Front, 1916–1918
- Size: Varied
- Engagements: First World War

Commanders
- Notable commanders: Hubert Gough; Henry Rawlinson; William Peyton; William Birdwood

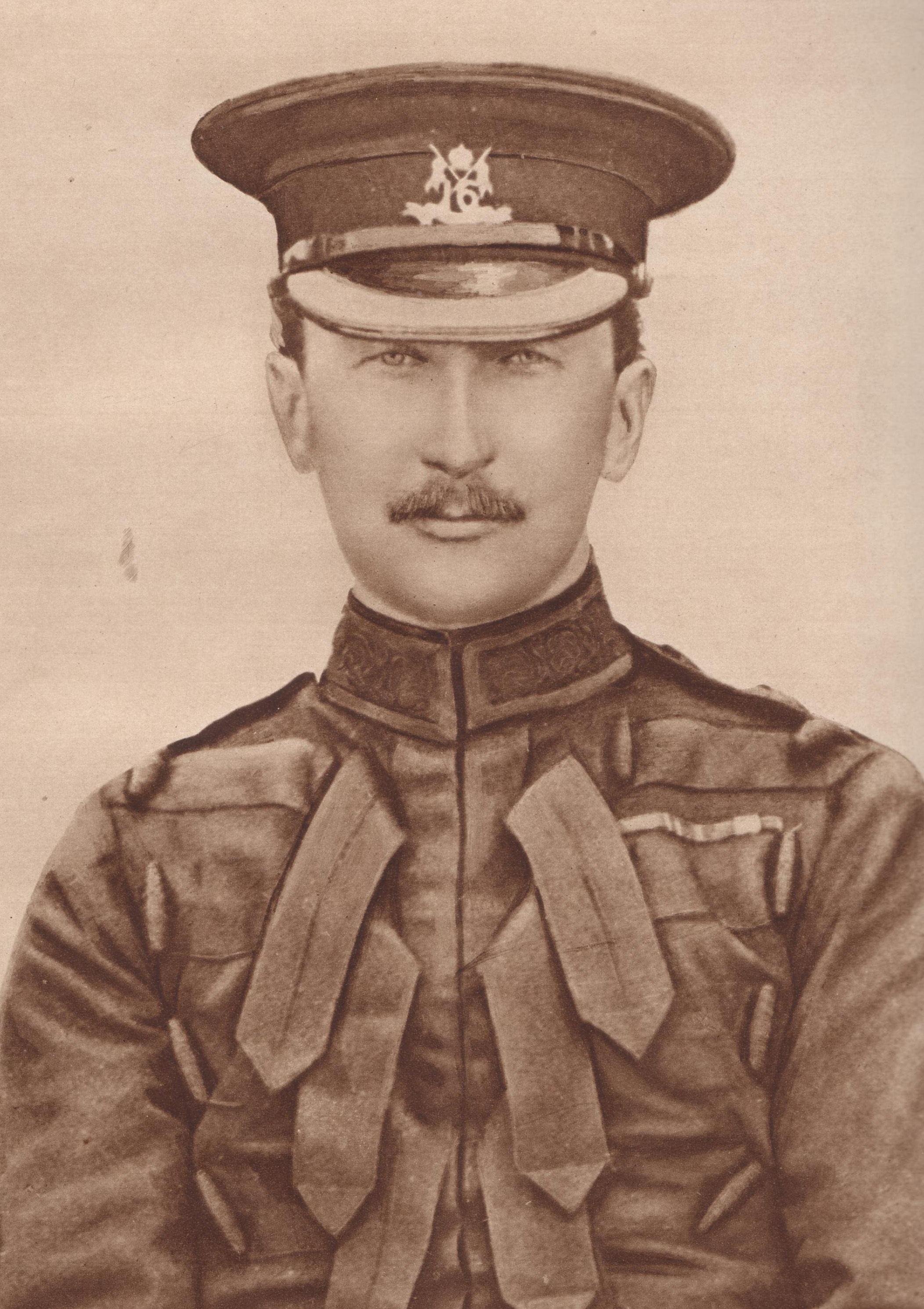
Lieutenant General Hubert de la Poer Gough

The Fifth Army was a field army of the British Army during World War I that formed part of the British Expeditionary Force on the Western Front between 1916 and 1918. The army originated as the Reserve Corps during the preparations for the British part of the Somme Offensive of 1916, was renamed Reserve Army when it was expanded and became the Fifth Army in October 1916.

== History ==
The Fifth Army was created on 30 October 1916, by renaming the Reserve Army (General Hubert Gough). It participated in the Battle of the Ancre, which became the final British effort in the Battle of the Somme.

In 1917, the Fifth Army was involved in the Battle of Arras and then the Third Battle of Ypres. The following year, the Fifth Army took over a stretch of front-line previously occupied by the French south of the River Somme and on 21 March, bore the brunt of the opening phase of the German Spring Offensive, known as Operation Michael. The failure of the Fifth Army to withstand the German advance led to Gough's dismissal and replacement by General Henry Rawlinson on 28 March and on 2 April, the army was renamed the Fourth Army. Gough and his remaining staff officers were to be renamed the Reserve Army with a headquarters at Crécy-en-Ponthieu, to survey a defensive line west of Amiens as a precaution and to oversee the building of all GHQ lines. After Gough was removed and sent home, General William Peyton took over the HQ until 23 May, when the Reserve Army title was dropped and the Fifth Army HQ was re-formed, under the command of General William Birdwood. Although the Fifth Army was blamed for failing to hold the German advance, it was later "triumphantly vindicated".

=== Commanders ===
- October 1916 – March 1918 General Sir Hubert Gough
- April–May 1918 General Sir William Peyton
- May–November 1918 General Sir William Birdwood

== Second World War ==
The army was not reraised during the Second World War. However, due to various Allied deception efforts, German intelligence over-estimated the number of Allied forces based within the UK by the start of 1944. While there was no specific deception effort to create the Third Army, German intelligence believed that one had been formed from Eastern Command.
