= Delhi Herald Extraordinary =

British officer of arms

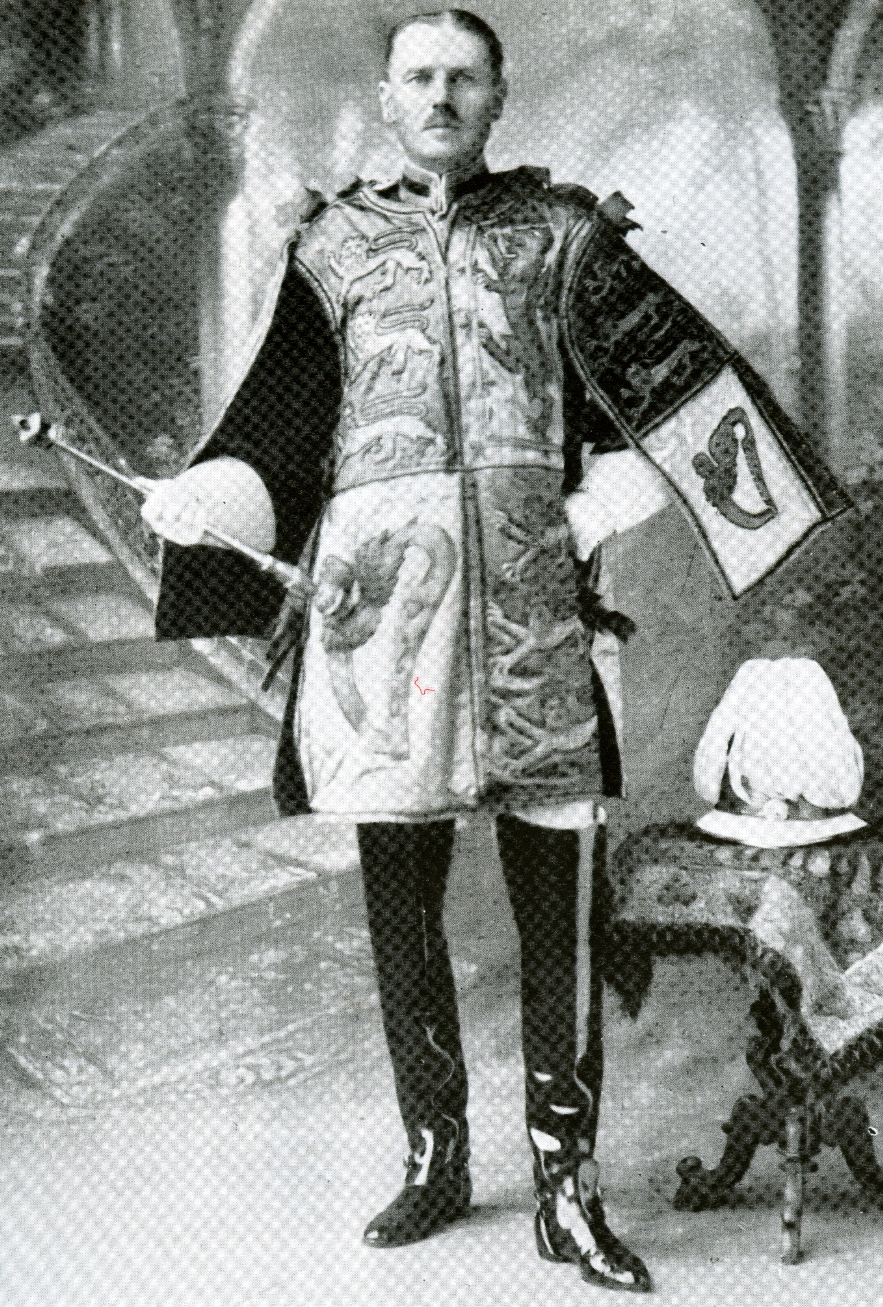
Brigadier-General William Peyton serving as Delhi Herald Extraordinary in 1911.

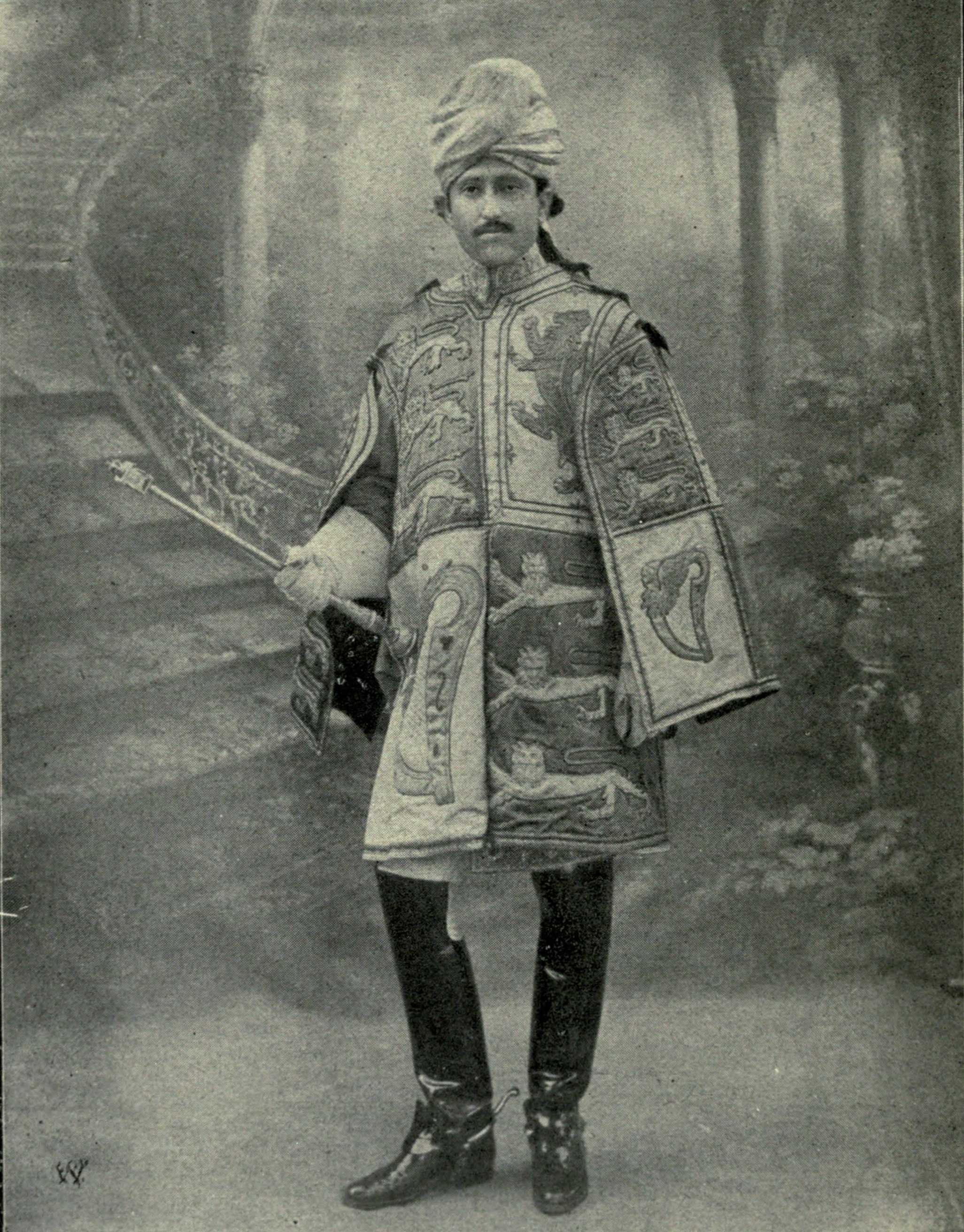
Captain the Hon. Malik Umar Hayat Khan, 18th King George's Own Lancers, as Assistant Delhi Herald, 1911.

Delhi Herald of Arms Extraordinary was a British officer of arms whose office was created in 1911 for the Delhi Durbar. Though an officer of the crown, Delhi Herald Extraordinary was not a member of the corporation of the College of Arms in London and his duties were more ceremonial than heraldic.

At the time the office was created in 1911, Brigadier-General William Peyton was appointed Delhi Herald of Arms Extraordinary, while Captain the Hon. Malik Umar Hayat Khan was made Assistant Herald. Later heraldic officers with reference to India were not appointed.

== See also ==
- Heraldry
- Herald
- Osmond Barnes

== Bibliography ==
- O'Donoghue, Peter, Heralds at the Delhi Durbars in The Coat of Arms (journal of The Heraldry Society), September 2006
