= Oudh Commercial Bank =

Indian bank

- Company type: Private company
- Industry: Banking
- Founded: 1881
- Defunct: 1958
- Fate: Failed
- Headquarters: Faizabad, India

Oudh Commercial Bank or Awadh Commercial Bank was an Indian bank established in 1881, in Faizabad and operated until 1958, when it failed. It was the first commercial bank in India having limited liability and an entirely Indian board of directors. It was a small bank that had no branches and that served only local needs.

== History ==
Before it failed it acquired the Bank of Rohilkund (or Bank of Rohilkhand), which Sir Yusef Ali Khan, Nawab of Rampur (1832–1887), had promoted over the objection of local moneylenders. Bank of Rohilkund was established in 1862, just after the acceptance of limited liability for banks. Bank of Rohilkund was the first promoted by a princely state; it too was a small bank.

== See also ==
- List of oldest banks in India
