= Farzand-i-Dilband Rasikh-al-Iqtidad-i-Daulat-i-Inglishia =

Indian princely title

Farzand-i-Dilband Rasikh-al-Iqtidad-i-Daulat-i-Inglishia (lit. 'Beloved and firmly faithful son of the English Government') was a title in the Indian subcontinent. It was used by the Maharajas of Kapurthala and Jind.

== History ==
For the services Randhir Singh, the Maharaja of Kapurthala, rendered to the East India Company and to the British cause during the rebellion of 1857, he was granted by the British Government the title of Farzand-i-Dilband Rasikh-al-Iqtidad in 1858, to which they added Daulat-i-Inglishia on 6 March 1863. Similarly, Swarup Singh, the Raja of Jind, remained loyal to the British cause during the rebellion, on account of which the title of Farzand-i-Dilband Rasikh-al-Iqtidad was conferred by the British Government on him on 2 June 1858, and to this title the Government made the addition of Daulat-i-Inglishia on 14 January 1860.

== See also ==
- Farzand-i-Khas-i-Daulat-i-Inglishia
- Farzand-i-Saadat-i-Nishan-i-Hazrat-i-Kaiser-i-Hind
- Farzand-i-Dilpazir-i-Daulat-i-Inglishia
