= Kasturchand Daga =

Diwan Bahadur Sir Kasturchand Daga KCIE
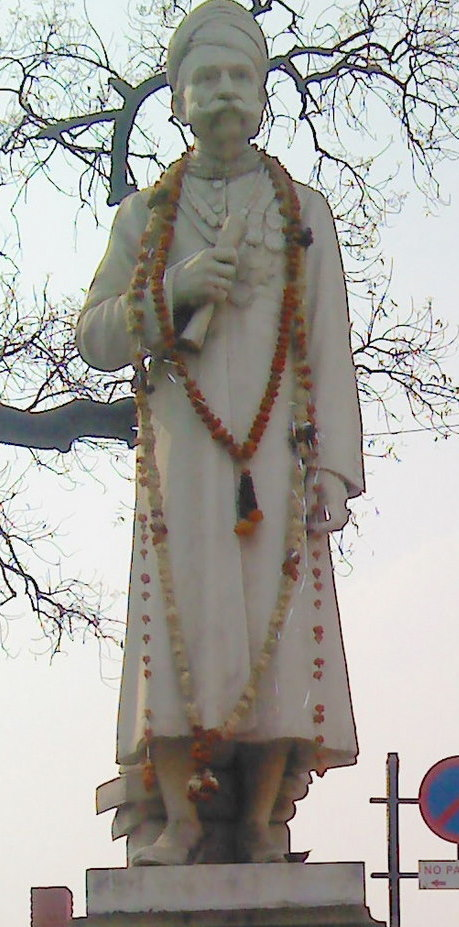
- Statue of Kasturchand Daga in Nagpur, which was unveiled by then Governor Sir Frank Sly in December 1924
- Born: 1855
- Died: 21 January 1917 (aged 61–62)
- Occupations: Businessman, Philanthropist & Owner of Rai Bahadur Bansilal Abirchand (RBBA) Company
- Spouse: Amritbai Daga
- Father: Rai Bahadur Abirchand Bansilal Daga

Diwan Bahadur Sir Seth Kasturchand Daga, KCIE (1855-1917) was a businessman, landlord, philanthropist, and a pioneer who had conceptualised and implemented the hub-and-spoke model of trade. He was from Nagpur. He was made Knight Commander of the Most Eminent Order of the Indian Empire by King George V at the 1911 Delhi Durbar Honours.

Kasturchand started his entrepreneurial and banking journey from Nagpur and expanded his banking business from Lahore (now in Pakistan) to Yangon (then in Burma), with transactions extending up to Europe.

He was the founder of several textile mills in the then Central Provinces including the Model Mills of Nagpur, and Daga mills at Hinganghat and Badnera (now in Maharashtra). His company, Rai Bahadur Bansilal Abirchand (RBBA) Company, which had over 22 ventures in different sectors, was worth several hundred crores in those times.

He served as a Khazanchi to the Bank of Bengal and Chairman of Nagpur Electric Light and Power Co Ltd. Sir Kasturchand Daga died on 21 January 1917.

== Philanthropy ==
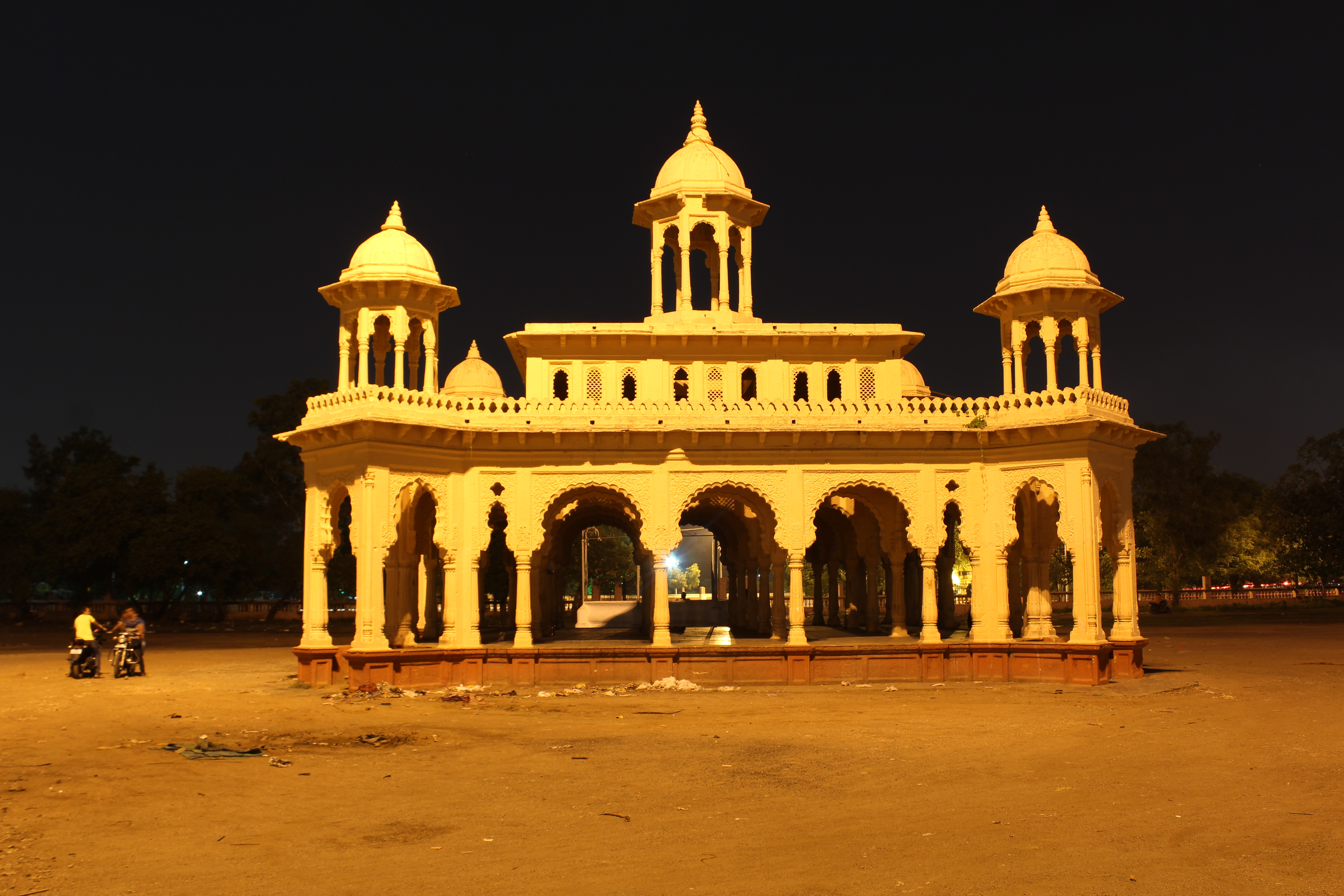
The Kasturchand Park in Nagpur is named after him. He had organized Nagpur's second industrial exhibition in the park by depositing Rs 25,000 on November 12, 1908.

Daga was a philanthropist and had constructed works of Public utility such as tanks, wells, schools, hospitals, Dharmshalas and markets. He established Daga Hospital in Nagpur, which is now under the Nagpur Municipal Corporation.

The land for Kasturchand Park was also donated by him. Lady Amritbai Daga College, a women's college, located in Nagpur, which was named after his wife, Amritbai Daga, was one of his contributions at the time when women's education was the last priorities in the society.

Kasturchand Daga had donated Rs 3.7 lakh, which facilitated the construction of the first railway line in Bikaner. He alone advanced a loan of Rs 3.46 lakhs towards the expansion of the railway network in Rajasthan.

== Honours and titles ==
- He received the title of Rai Bahadur from Bikaner State in 1880; Rai Bahadur from British Government in 1887; Dewan Bahadur in 1903.
- He was honoured with K.I.H. Silver medal in 1898.
- Daga was awarded the Companion of the Most Eminent Order of the Indian Empire in the 1909 New Year Honours and then was made Knight Commander of the Most Eminent Order of the Indian Empire by King George V at the 1911 Delhi Durbar Honours.

== Kasturchand Park ==
The ground generally known as KP was part of the land ceded to East India Company by the treaty of 1818. It was under the control of British army (Madras Army) for many years. It had built few building on this ground as arsenal and had stored several tons of explosive gunpowder till late 19th century. In 1880 Nagpur Civil Station municipal committee was formed and the land was handed over to the civil authorities. Kasturchand Daga donated rupees twenty five thousand for construction of an open pavilion during the exhibition in the year 1905.the Pavilion in the center of the Arsenal Ground. This was built with pale sandstone found locally and is a permanent structure destined to be a perpetual memory of the Exhibition of 1908 in days to come. The structure is light and graceful in design, characteristically Indian in its intricate arches and elaborate pillars rising one above the other to the delicate cupolas that crown the whole. It was designed and carried out by W.B Starkey, the Superintending Engineer, the finest carving being done by local skill. A marble plaque over the central arch on the southern side of the Pavilion says that the Pavilion was constructed to commemorate the Industrial Exhibition of 1908 by Diwan Bahadur Kasturchand Daga. The plaque now lies unnoticed under a layer of whitewash.

The Bishop Cotton School completed 50 years in 1913 and its week-long celebrations were inaugurated at the ‘Diwan Kasturchand's Pavilion Ground’. It was shortened to "Kasturchand Ground" a name that has stayed with it to date, giving rise to the myth that the land was donated by Diwan Kasturchand Daga.

Kasturchand Daga was knighted in 1911 and he died in 1917. In 1920 his business partner and friend Manekji Dadabhai erected a statue of Sir Daga in the north-east corner of this ground. But the ground has belonged to the government military or civil since 1818 and will always belong to it.
