= Yusef Ali Khan =

Nawab Muhammad Yusef Ali Khan Bahadur of Rampur
- Nawab of Rampur; Chief Of The Rohilla; His Highness, Ali Jah, Farzand-i-Dilpazir, Mukhlis ud-Daula, Nasir ul-Mulk, Amir ul-Umara, Mustaid Jang
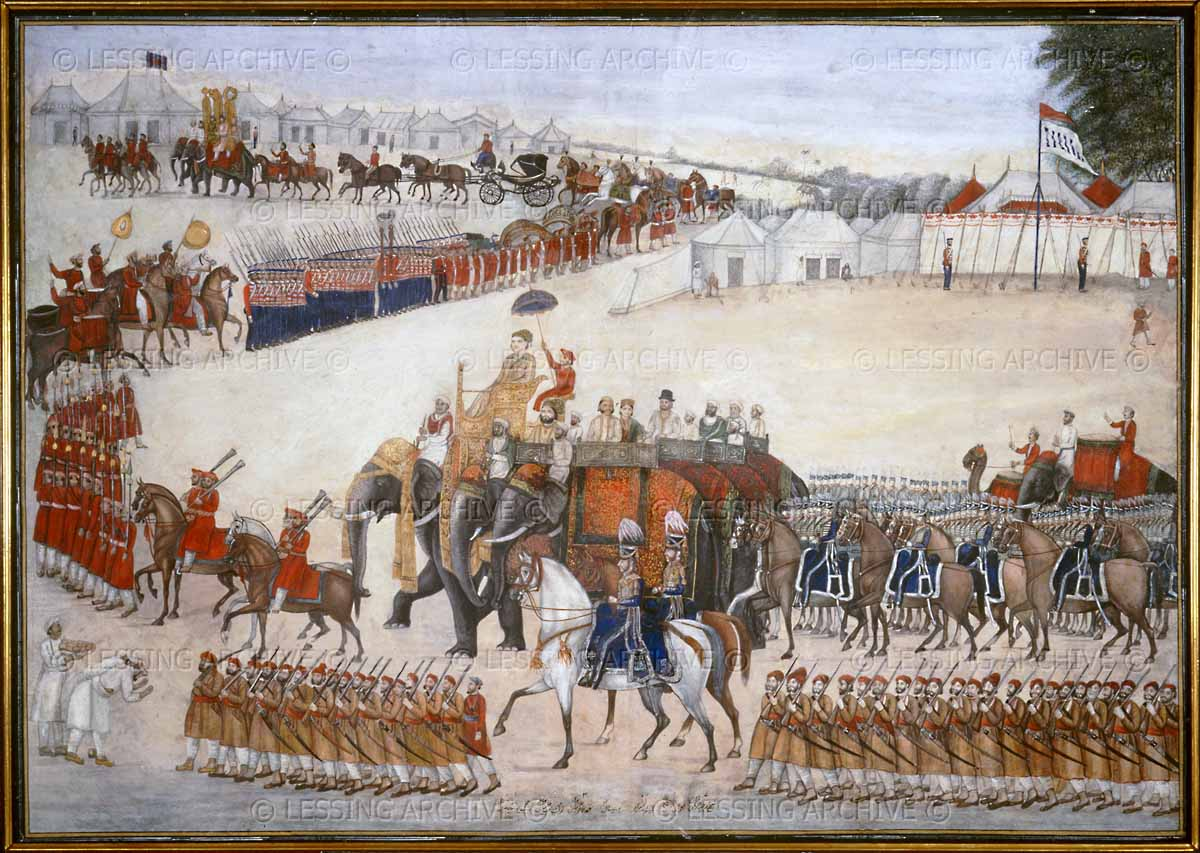
- The procession of Yusef Ali Khan

Nawab of Rampur
- Reign: 1855-1865
- Predecessor: Nawab Muhammad Said Khan of Rampur
- Successor: Nawab Muhammad Kalb E Ali Khan

Chief of the Rohilla
- Reign: 1855-1865
- Predecessor: Nawab Muhammad Said Khan of Rampur
- Successor: Nawab Muhammad Kalb E Ali Khan
- Born: 5 March 1816; Qila-E-Mualla, Rampur
- Died: 21 April 1865 (aged 49); Qila-E-Mualla, Rampur
- Burial: Qila-E-Mualla Imambara
Names
- Nawab Muhammad Yusef Ali Khan Bahadur
Regnal name
- His Highness, ‘Ali Jah, Farzand-i-Dilpazir, Mukhlis ud-Daula, Nasir ul-Mulk, Amir ul-Umara, Nawab Sir Muhammad Yusef ‘Ali Khan Bahadur, Mustaid Jang, Nawab of Rampur, KCSI
- House: Rohilla (by Adoption)
- Father: Nawab Muhammad Said Khan
- Mother: Nawab Fath Un Nisa Begum Sahiba
- Religion: Islam

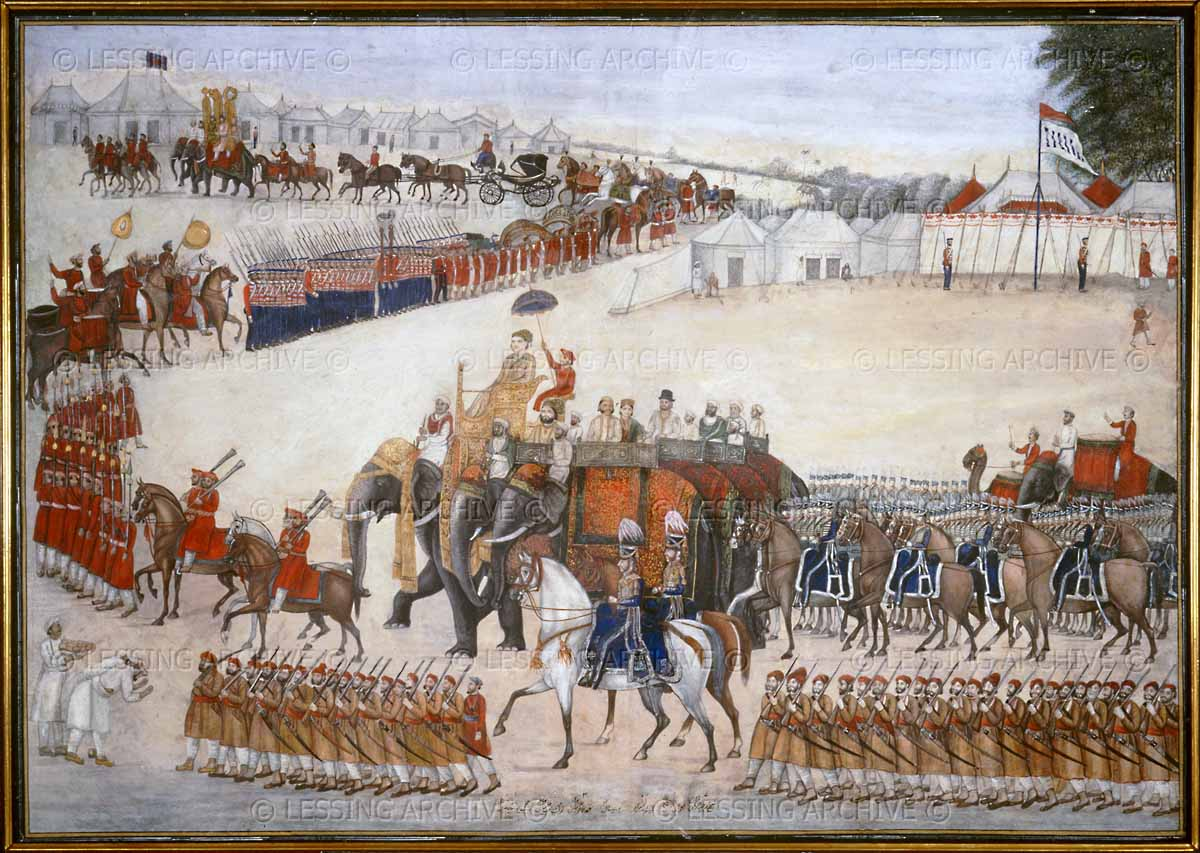
The Procession of Yusef Ali Khan. A painting depicting Yusef Khan on his way to the encampment of Lord Canning for the durbar held at Fatehgarh on 15 November 1859

Nawab Muhammad Yusef Ali Khan Bahadur, KCSI, (5 March 1816 – 21 April 1865) was a Nawab of the princely state of Rampur from 1855 to 1865. During the Indian Rebellion of 1857, he rendered many useful services to the East India Company by keeping the British supply and communication lines to Naini Tal open, rescuing fugitives and securing the town of Moradabad. For his service, he was granted extensive lands in Bareilly by the Viceroy of India, Lord Canning, was knighted in 1861 and given a 13-gun salute along with the style of His Highness. Finally, he was made a member of the Viceroy's Council. Despite this multitude of honours, Sir Yusef continued to preserve the Mughal artistic tradition by inviting musicians, scholars and artists of Bahadur Shah Zafar II's court to resettle at Rampur, including the great poet Ghalib.

Shortly before he died, the Yusef Ali Khan promoted the formation of the Bank of Rohilkund (or Bank of Rohilkhand), over the objection of local moneylenders. It was established in 1862, just after the acceptance of limited liability for banks. The bank was the first promoted by a princely state. It too was a small bank and was amalgamated into the Oudh Commercial Bank, which failed in 1958.

Yusef Ali Khan Rohilla Dynasty Born: 5 March 1816 Died: 21 April 1865
Regnal titles
Preceded by Muhammad Said Khan Bahadur	Nawab of Rampur; 1855-1865	Succeeded by Kalb Ali Khan Bahadur
