= Farzand-i-Dilpazir-i-Daulat-i-Inglishia =

Indian princely title

Farzand-i-Dilpazir-i-Daulat-i-Inglishia (lit. 'Esteemed son of the English Government') was a title in the Indian subcontinent. It was used by the Nawab of Rampur.

== History ==
During the rebellion of 1857, Yusef Ali Khan, the Nawab of Rampur, rendered prompt and valuable assistance to the East India Company. In recognition and appreciation of this, the Earl Canning, in his capacity as Viceroy and Governor-General of India, conferred upon him, on behalf of Her Majesty’s Government, the title of Farzand-i-Dilpazir at a durbar he held at Fatehgarh on 25 November 1859. During the reign of Yusef’s successor, Kalb Ali Khan, the British Government on 10 January 1873 added the words Daulat-i-Inglishia to this title.

== See also ==
- Farzand-i-Khas-i-Daulat-i-Inglishia
- Farzand-i-Dilband Rasikh-al-Iqtidad-i-Daulat-i-Inglishia
- Farzand-i-Saadat-i-Nishan-i-Hazrat-i-Kaiser-i-Hind
