= Muhammad Mushtaq Ali Khan =

Nawab Mushtaq Ali Khan of Rampur
- Nawab of Rampur; Chief of the Rohilla His Highness, ‘Ali Jah, Farzand-i-Dilpazir-i-Daulat-i- Inglishia, Mukhlis ud-Daula, Nasir ul-Mulk, Amir ul-Umara, Mustaid Jang
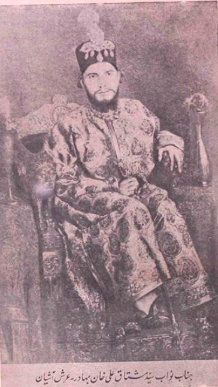
- Rampur State Coat of Arms

Rampur
- Reign: 1886-1889
- Predecessor: Nawab Kalb E Ali Khan
- Successor: Nawab Hamid Ali Khan

Chief of the Rohilla
- Reign: 1886-1889
- Predecessor: Nawab Kalb E Ali Khan
- Successor: Nawab Hamid Ali Khan
- Born: 1856
- Died: 25 February 1889 (aged 32–33); Machi Bhawan, Qila-E- Mualla, Rampur
Names
- Nawab Sayyid Muhammad Mushtaq Ali Khan Bahadur Rohilla
Regnal name
- His Highness, ‘Ali Jah, Farzand-i-Dilpazir-i-Daulat-i- Inglishia, Mukhlis ud-Daula, Nasir ul-Mulk, Amir ul-Umara, Nawab Muhammad Mushtaq ‘Ali Khan Bahadur, Mustaid Jang, Nawab of Rampur.
- House: Rohilla (by Adoption); Barha
- Father: Nawab Kalb E Ali Khan
- Mother: Nawab Hatim Uz Zamani Nizami Begum Sahiba
- Religion: Islam

Nawab Muhammad Mushtaq Ali Khan Bahadur, (1856-25 February 1889) was a Nawab of the princely state of Rampur from 1886 to 1889, succeeding his father Sir Nawab Kalb Ali Khan Bahadur. Owing to continued ill-health, including physical paralysis, he was unable to properly rule and govern the state and so left its affairs in the hand of an administrative council. However, he was successful in continuing the beneficiaries of his predecessors, particularly in the areas of agriculture and irrigation.

After the Irish urologist Peter Freyer treated his bladder stone with the recently-developed method of litholapaxy, the Nawab gave him 100,000 Indian rupees in gratitude. This "caused trouble with [Freyer's] superiors" that led to him leaving India and returning to England, with the resources to set up in private practice.

He died at the age of 32 in 1889 and was succeeded by his son, Sir Hamid Ali Khan Bahadur.

Muhammad Mushtaq Ali Khan Rohilla Dynasty Born: 1856 Died: 1889
Regnal titles
Preceded by Kalb Ali Khan Bahadur	Nawab of Rampur; 1886-1889	Succeeded by Hamid Ali Khan Bahadur
