= Delhi Durbar =

Assembly organised by the British Raj

Coordinates: 28.7235°N 77.1968°E

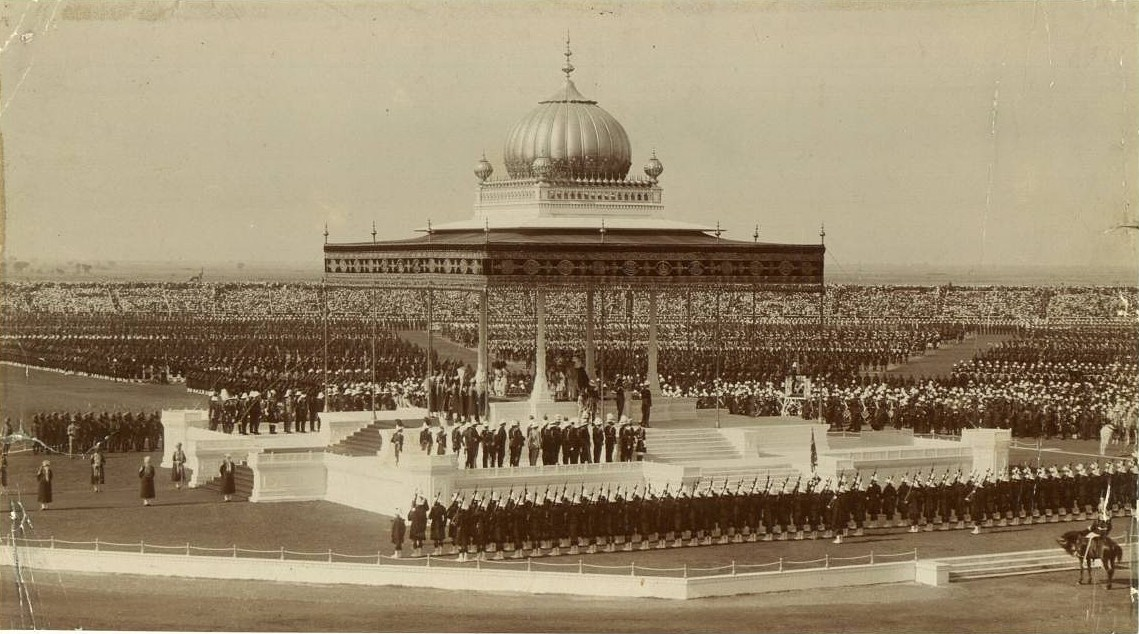
The Delhi Durbar of 1911, with King George V and Queen Mary seated upon the dais.

The Delhi Durbar (lit. "Court of Delhi") was the imperial mass assembly organized by the British Raj at Coronation Park, Delhi, India, to mark the accession of an emperor or empress of India. The ceremonial name was derived from the Persian term, durbar (royal court). Also known as the Imperial Durbar, it was held three times, in 1877, 1903, and 1911, at the height of the British Empire. The 1911 Durbar was the only one that a sovereign, George V, attended; at the earlier Durbars, the monarch was represented by their viceroy. A Durbar was contemplated in 1937 or 1938 for George VI, the last emperor, but was deferred, primarily on account of the burgeoning independence movement festering in the British Raj. The Durbar was rendered obsolete by the emergence of India and Pakistan as independent nations following World War II.

== Durbar of 1877 ==
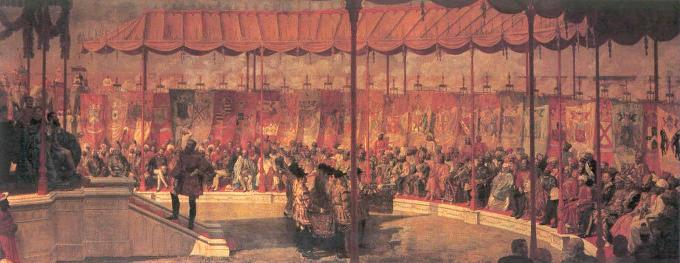
The Delhi Durbar of 1877. The Viceroy of India is seated on the dais to the left.

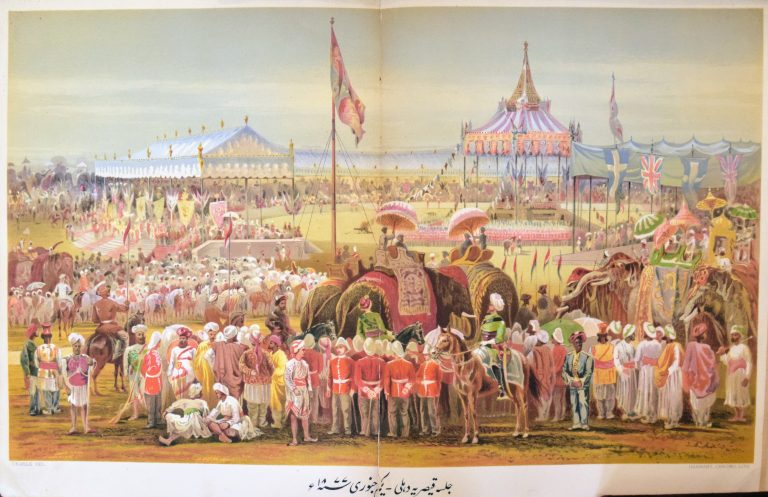
This illustration depicts some of the shān-o-shaukat (pomp and show) of the imperial assemblage in Delhi in January 1877

Called the "Proclamation Durbar", the Durbar of 1877, for which the organisation was undertaken by Thomas Henry Thornton, was held beginning on 1 January 1877 to proclaim Queen Victoria as Empress of India by the British. The 1877 Durbar was largely an official event and not a popular occasion with mass participation like the later durbars in 1903 and 1911. It was attended by the Lord Lytton, Viceroy of India, along with maharajas, nawabs, and intellectuals.

Inside the Victoria Memorial in Calcutta is an inscription taken from the message of Queen Victoria presented at the 1877 Durbar to the people of India:

We trust that the present occasion
may tend to unite in bonds of close
affection ourselves and our subjects;
that from the highest to the humblest,
all may feel that under our rule the
great principles of liberty, equity,
and justice are secured to them; and
to promote their happiness, to add to
their prosperity, and advance their
welfare, are the ever present aims and
objects of our Empire.

The Empress of India Medal to commemorate the proclamation of the Queen as Empress of India was struck and distributed to the honoured guests, and the elderly Ramanath Tagore was raised to the status of an honorary Raja by Lord Lytton, viceroy of India.

It was at this glittering durbar that Ganesh Vasudeo Joshi, wearing "homespun spotless white khadi" rose to read a citation on behalf of the grass roots native political organization, the Poona Sarvajanik Sabha, which organization presaged the later rise of the Indian National Congress. Joshi's speech put forth a demand couched in very polite language:

"…Her Majesty to grant to India the same political and social status as is enjoyed by her British subjects."

With this demand, it can be posited that the campaign for Indian Independence was formally launched, which was the beginning of a great transformation for India.

The durbar would later be seen as controversial because it directed funds away from the Great Famine of 1876–78.

== Durbar of 1903 ==
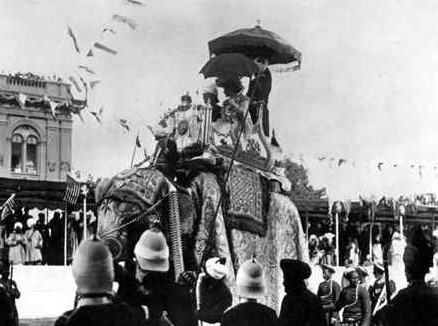
Lord and Lady Curzon arriving at the Delhi Durbar, 1903

The durbar was held beginning on 1 January 1903 to celebrate the coronation of King Edward VII and Queen Alexandra. The two full weeks of festivities were devised in meticulous detail by Lord Curzon, Viceroy of India. It was a dazzling display of pomp, power, and split-second timing. Neither the earlier Delhi Durbar of 1877 nor the later Durbar of 1911 could match the pageantry of Curzon's festivities. In a few short months at the end of 1902, a deserted plain was transformed into an elaborate tented city, complete with temporary light railway to bring crowds of spectators out from Delhi, a post office with its own stamps, telephone and telegraphic facilities, a variety of stores, a police force with specially designed uniforms, a hospital, a magistrate's court and complex sanitation, drainage, and electric light installations. Souvenir guidebooks were sold and maps of the camping ground distributed. Marketing opportunities were craftily exploited. A special Delhi Durbar Medal was struck, as part of the celebrations.

Edward VII, to Curzon's disappointment, did not attend but sent his brother, the Duke of Connaught and Strathearn, who arrived with dignitaries by train from Bombay just as Curzon and his government came in the other direction from Calcutta. The assembly awaiting them displayed a collection of jewels. Each of the Indian princes was adorned with gems from the collections of centuries. Maharajahs came with retinues from all over India, many of them meeting for the first time while the massed ranks of the Indian armies, under their Commander-in-Chief Lord Kitchener, paraded, played their bands, and restrained the crowds.

On the first day, the Curzons entered the area of festivities, together with the maharajahs, riding on elephants, some with huge gold candelabra stuck on their tusks. The durbar ceremony itself fell on New Year's Day and was followed by days of polo and other sports, dinners, balls, military reviews, bands, and exhibitions. The world's press dispatched their best journalists, artists and photographers to cover proceedings. The popularity of movie footage of the event, shown in makeshift cinemas throughout India, is often credited with having launched the country's early film industry.

India Post issued a set of two commemorative souvenir sheets with special cancellation struck on 1 January 1903 – 12 noon, a much sought-after item for stamp collectors today.

The event culminated in a grand coronation ball attended only by the highest-ranking guests, presided over by Lord Curzon and Lady Curzon in her jewels and peacock gown.

== Durbar of 1911 ==
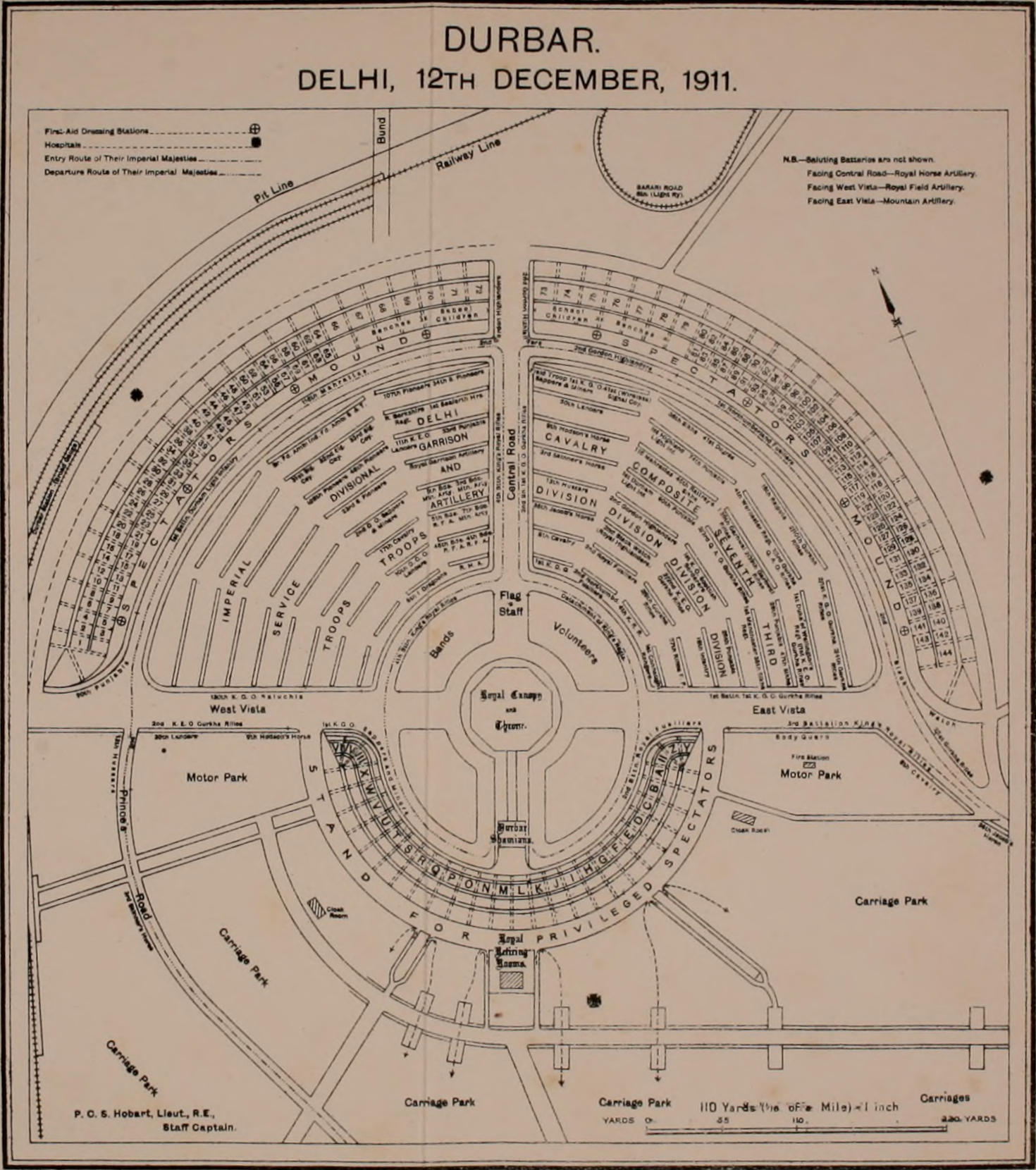
Plan of the 1911 Durbar arena.

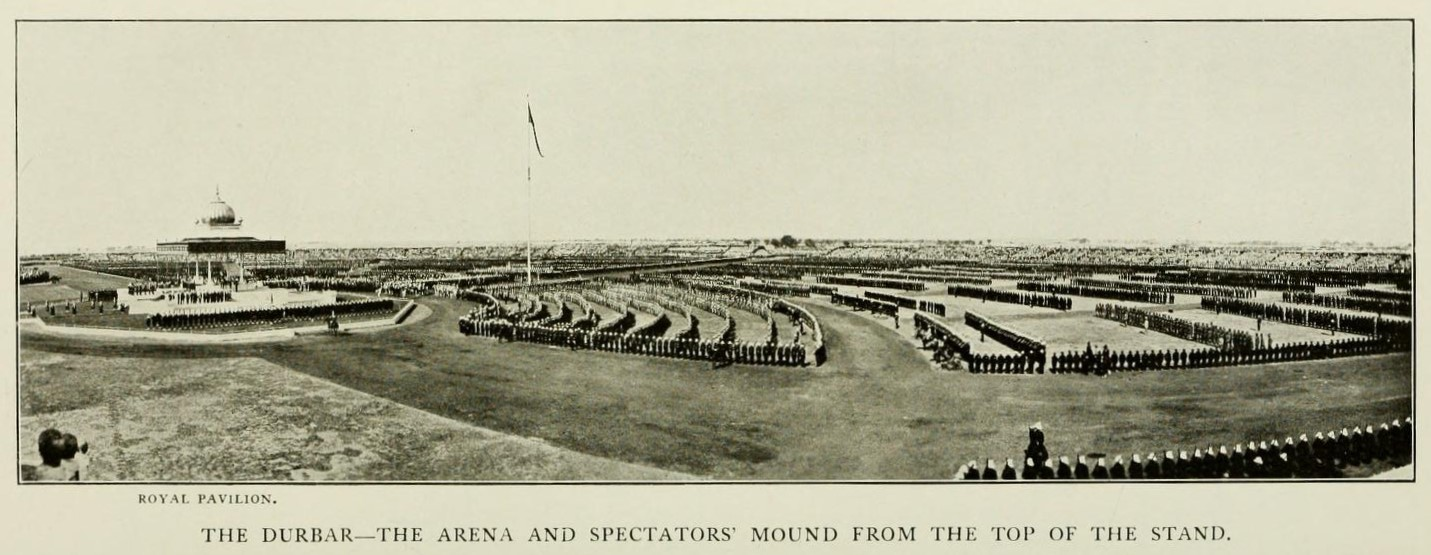
View of the Durbar arena from the grandstand.

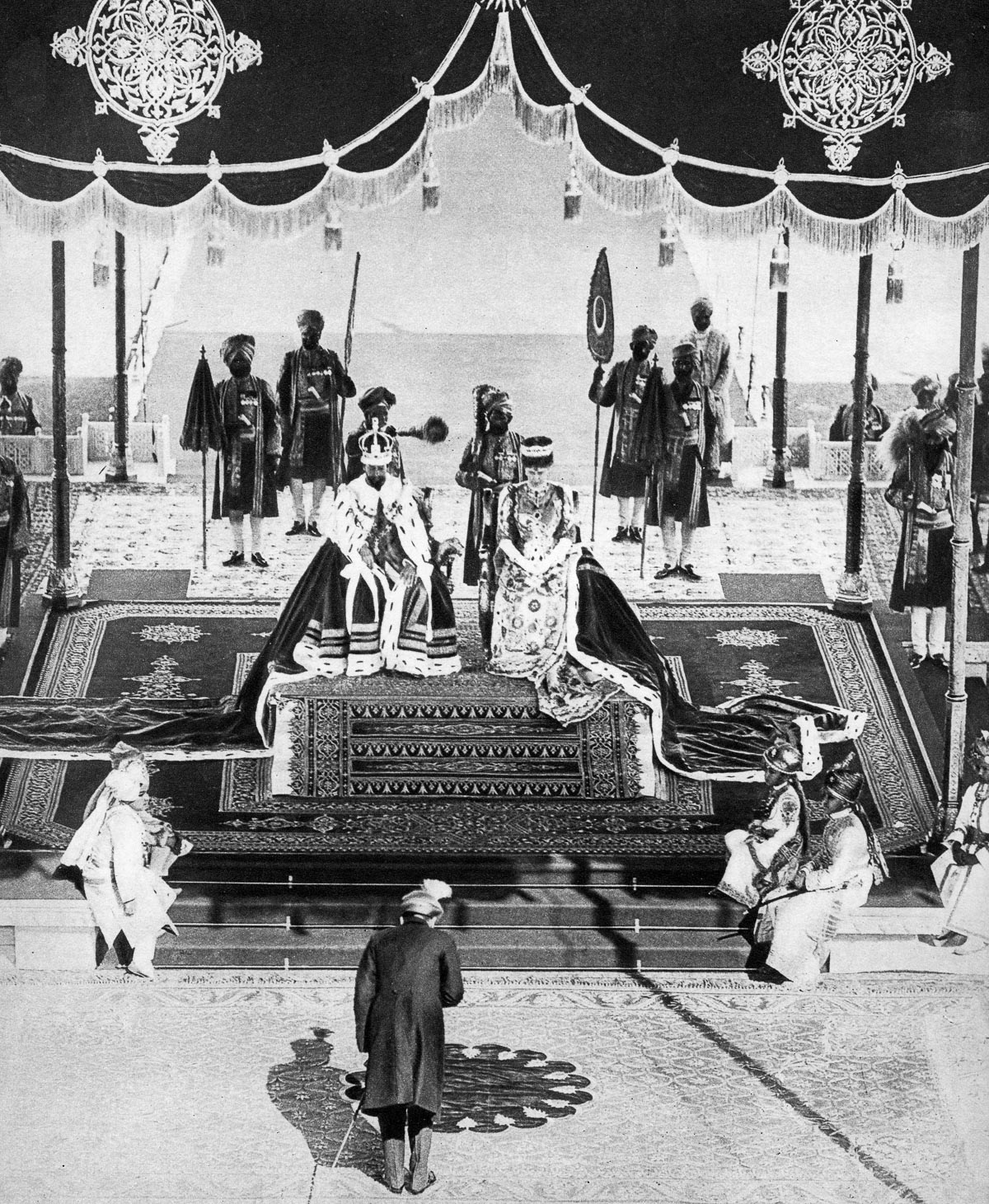
The Nizam of Hyderabad Mir Osman Ali Khan pays homage to the Emperor and Empress at the Delhi Durbar, December 1911.

On 22 March 1911, a royal proclamation announced that the Durbar would be held in December to commemorate the coronation a few months earlier of King George V and Queen Mary and allow them to be proclaimed in person as Emperor and Empress of India. Every governor and all the rulers of princely states in India were summoned to pay obeisance.

The King and Queen left Portsmouth on 11 November aboard RMS Medina, a new P&O ocean liner, arriving in Delhi on 7 December in a grand State Entry through the city gates in which 50,000 troops participated, led by Sir O'Moore Creagh, the commander-in-chief of India. Escorted by a guard of the Household Cavalry, the King rode an Australian charger and was dressed in military uniform with a plumed pith helmet, to the disappointment of the people in the crowd, who had expected him to be riding an elephant and wearing a crown. The Queen followed in an open carriage. The following days were taken up with receptions for the Indian princes, a church parade and the presentation of regimental colours.

The Durbar itself was on Tuesday, 12 December, at Coronation Park, on which a semi-circular grandstand had been built for 10,000 government officials and other dignitaries, while further back an artificial mound seated 50,000 local people. The royal couple arrived in their Coronation robes, the King-Emperor wearing the Imperial Crown of India with eight arches, containing 6,100 diamonds, and covered with sapphires, emeralds and rubies, with a velvet and miniver cap all weighing 34 ounces (965 g). Seated on thrones, they listened as the Delhi Herald Extraordinary, Brigadier-General William Peyton, read out the proclamation in English, followed by the Assistant Herald, Captain Malik Umar Hayat Khan, who read it in Urdu. They received homage from the native princes – including one woman, the Begum of Bhopal – at the shamiana (ceremonial tent); controversy ensued when the Gaekwar of Baroda, Maharajah Sayajirao III, approached the royal couple without his jewellery on, and after a simple bow turned his back to them when leaving. His action was interpreted at the time as a sign of dissent to British rule. Afterwards, the royal couple ascended to the domed royal pavilion, where the King-Emperor announced the move of India's capital from Calcutta to Delhi. The annulment of the partition of Bengal was also announced during the ceremony. After the departure of the king and queen, the enthusiastic crowd surged into the arena.

On the following day, 13 December, the royal couple made a Jharokha Darshan (balcony appearance) at the Red Fort, to receive half a million or more of the common people who had come to greet them, a custom which was started by Mughal emperors. On 14 December, the King-Emperor presided over a military review of 40,000 troops, culminating in a great cavalry charge. There followed an investiture in Delhi Park, the first was the Queen who received the Order of the Star of India. 26,800 Delhi Durbar Medals in silver were awarded to the men and officers of the British and Indian Armies who participated in the 1911 event. A further two hundred were struck in gold, a hundred of which were awarded to Indian princely rulers and the highest ranking government officers.

Following the Durbar, the King and Queen left for ten days in Nepal, where the King was taken tiger hunting. After visiting Calcutta, they journeyed across India by train to Bombay, which they left on 10 January on RMS Medina.

A feature film of the event titled With Our King and Queen Through India (1912) – also known as The Durbar in Delhi – was filmed in the early color process Kinemacolor and released on 2 February 1912.

Generally the Durbar achieved its purpose of cementing support for British rule among the native princes (who pledged their fealty), as was demonstrated by the support given during the First World War.

Today, the Coronation Park in Delhi is sometimes used for big religious festivals and municipal conventions. The thrones used by King George V and Queen Mary are on display at Marble Hall Gallery and Museum at Rashtrapati Bhavan.

== Postponed Durbar of 1937 or 1938 ==
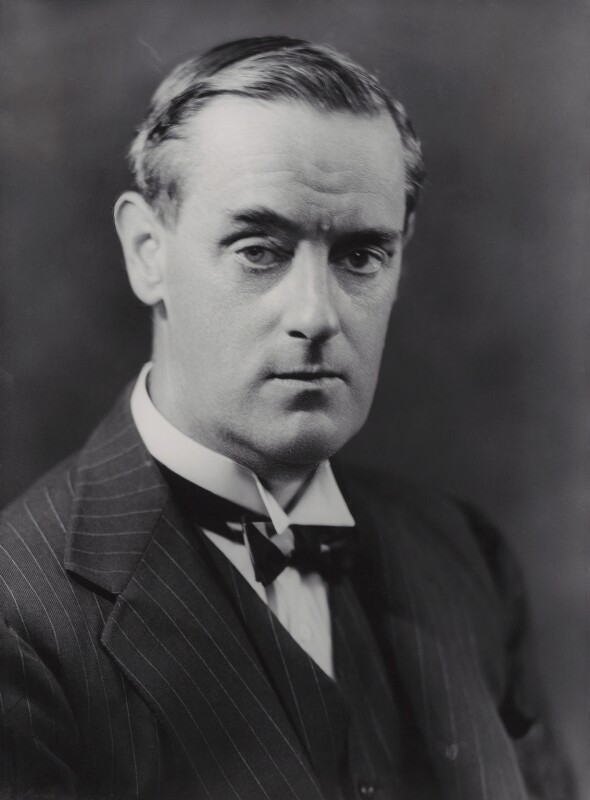
Victor Hope, 2nd Marquess of Linlithgow, the Governor-General and Viceroy of India, was initially enthusiastic about another durbar, but ultimately led efforts to have it indefinitely postponed.

On the death of George V in January 1936, his eldest son acceded as Edward VIII. In his first and only speech from the throne at the State Opening of Parliament in November 1936, he announced that he would attend a Durbar in Delhi during the winter following his coronation in 1937. When Edward abdicated in December 1936, it was initially envisaged that his brother George VI would continue with the Durbar as already planned, with the enthusiastic backing of the Secretary of State for India, Lord Zetland and the Viceroy, Lord Linlithgow. However, persuaded by the prime minister, Stanley Baldwin and his doctors, George decided that travelling to India in the aftermath of his coronation in May would place too great a strain on his health, and it was announced on 9 February 1937 that the Durbar had been postponed until "a later date". The reason given was that it was "impossible to contemplate a prolonged absence during the first year of his reign", so as not to give credence to rumours circulating about the king's physical and mental wellbeing.

By August 1937, the situation in India had changed. The Government of India Act 1935 had set in motion modest moves towards Indian self government; the pro-independence Indian National Congress had dominated the 1937 Indian provincial elections in seven out of eleven provinces, and had made it clear that they would not only boycott the Durbar but refuse to vote the funds to pay for it. Linlithgow wrote to Zetland in August saying that the king ought to be warned of "unpleasantness" if he visited India. Zetland took up the matter with the new prime minister, Neville Chamberlain, while the viceroy sought the opinion of the provincial governors, who were all against the idea. Meanwhile, Jawaharlal Nehru, the leader of the Congress party, told the Indian press that if the British Government wanted to protect the king from any sort of "untoward incident", then they ought to "keep him in England".

Chamberlain was persuaded and initially omitted any mention of royal visit to India from the king's speech of October 1937, but under pressure from the king and against the advice of the viceroy, included the non-committal line; "I am looking forward with interest and pleasure to the time when it will be possible for Me to visit My Indian Empire". Linlithgow and Zetland then made a determined effort to dissuade the king from visiting India, even on a more modest scale, using the pretext of finance rather than Indian politics. Quoting a cost of £1 million, all of which would fall on the central government of India and which, they advised, the Indian Finance Minister, James Grigg, was unwilling to support. Finally, in February 1938, the king had to be formally advised by Chamberlain to again postpone any visit "until the general world outlook has become more settled and the financial prospects [are] more definite".

Eventually, the onset of the Second World War and the movement towards Indian independence rendered the prospect of any royal visit nearly impossible.

== Gallery ==
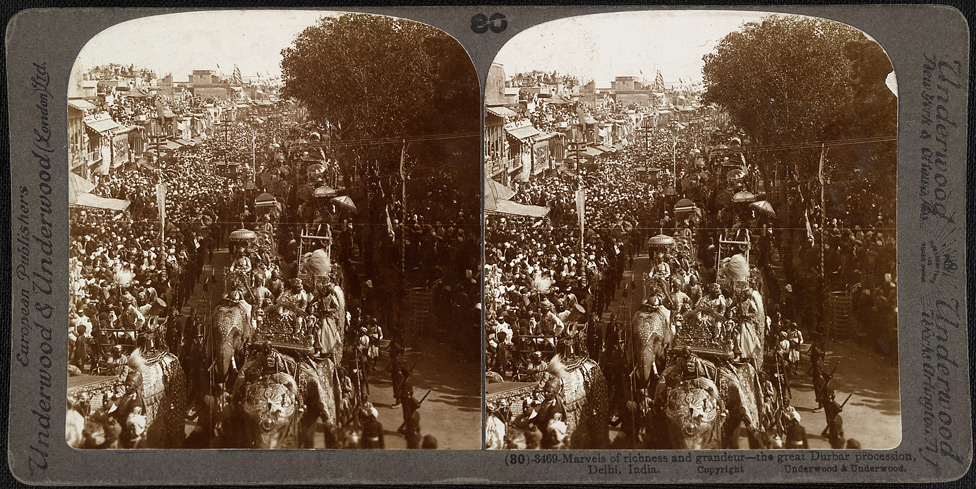
A view of the Durbar Procession of 1903

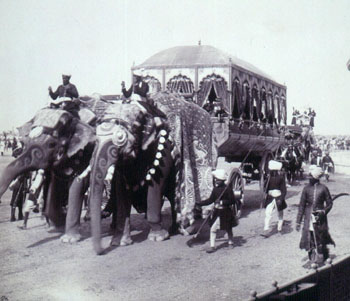
The elephant carriage of the Maharaja of Rewa, 1903 Delhi Durbar

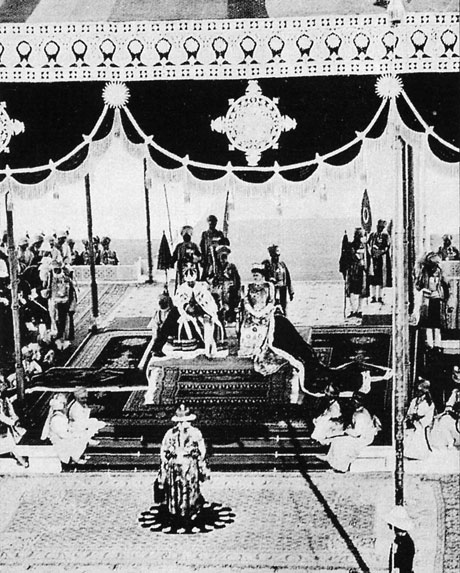
King George V and Queen Mary at the Delhi Durbar 1911

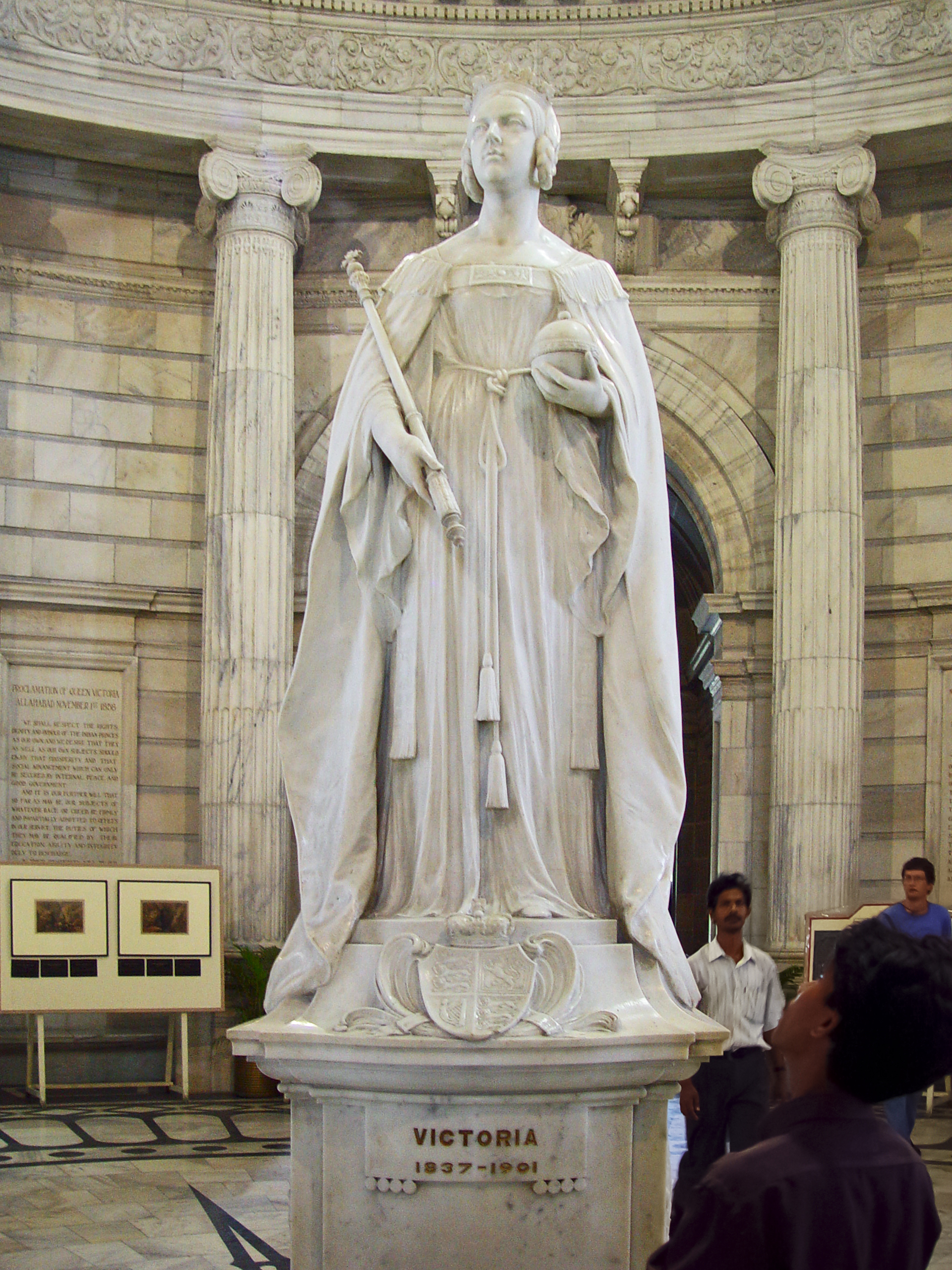
Interior of the Victoria Memorial, Kolkata (the inscription is to the right of the statue)

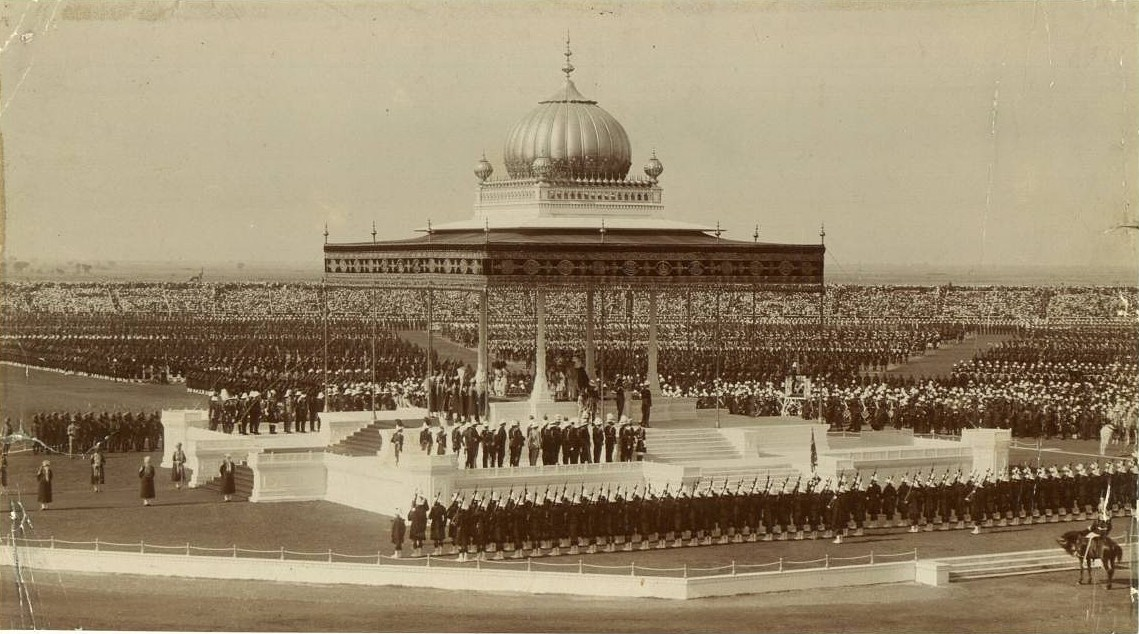
Durbar of 1911 in the amphitheatre created for the event

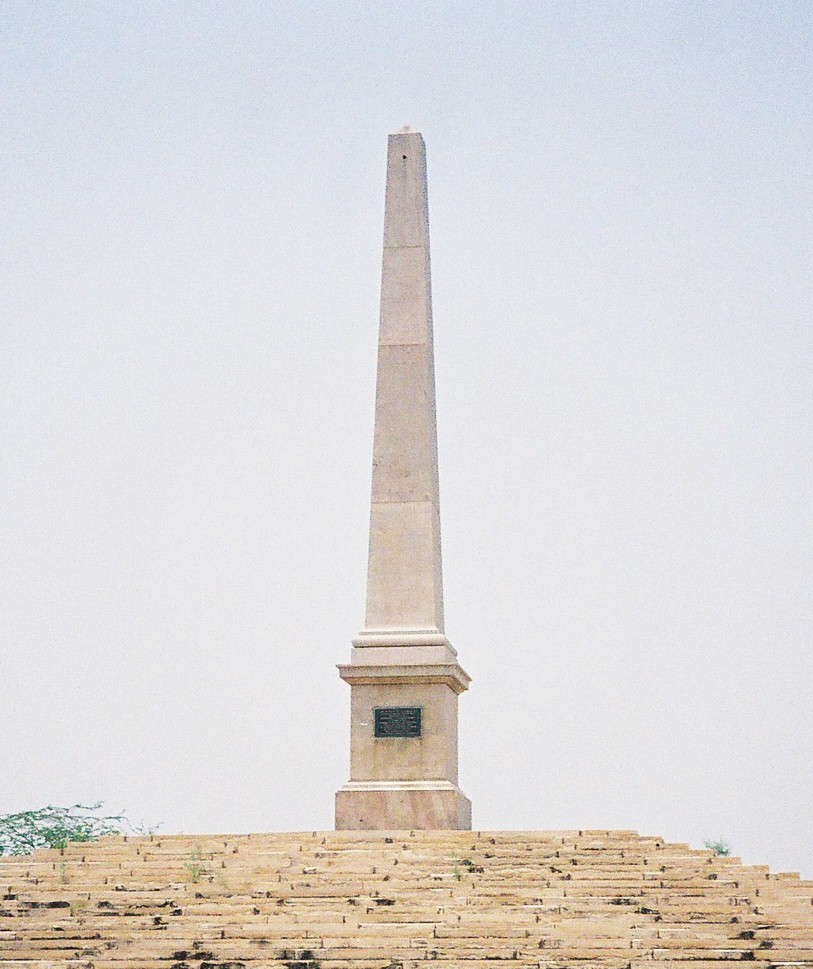
Commemorative Obelisk at Coronation Park, Delhi, erected at the exact place where King George V and Queen Mary sat in 'Delhi Durbar' of 1911 while declaring the shifting of capital of British Raj from Calcutta to Delhi

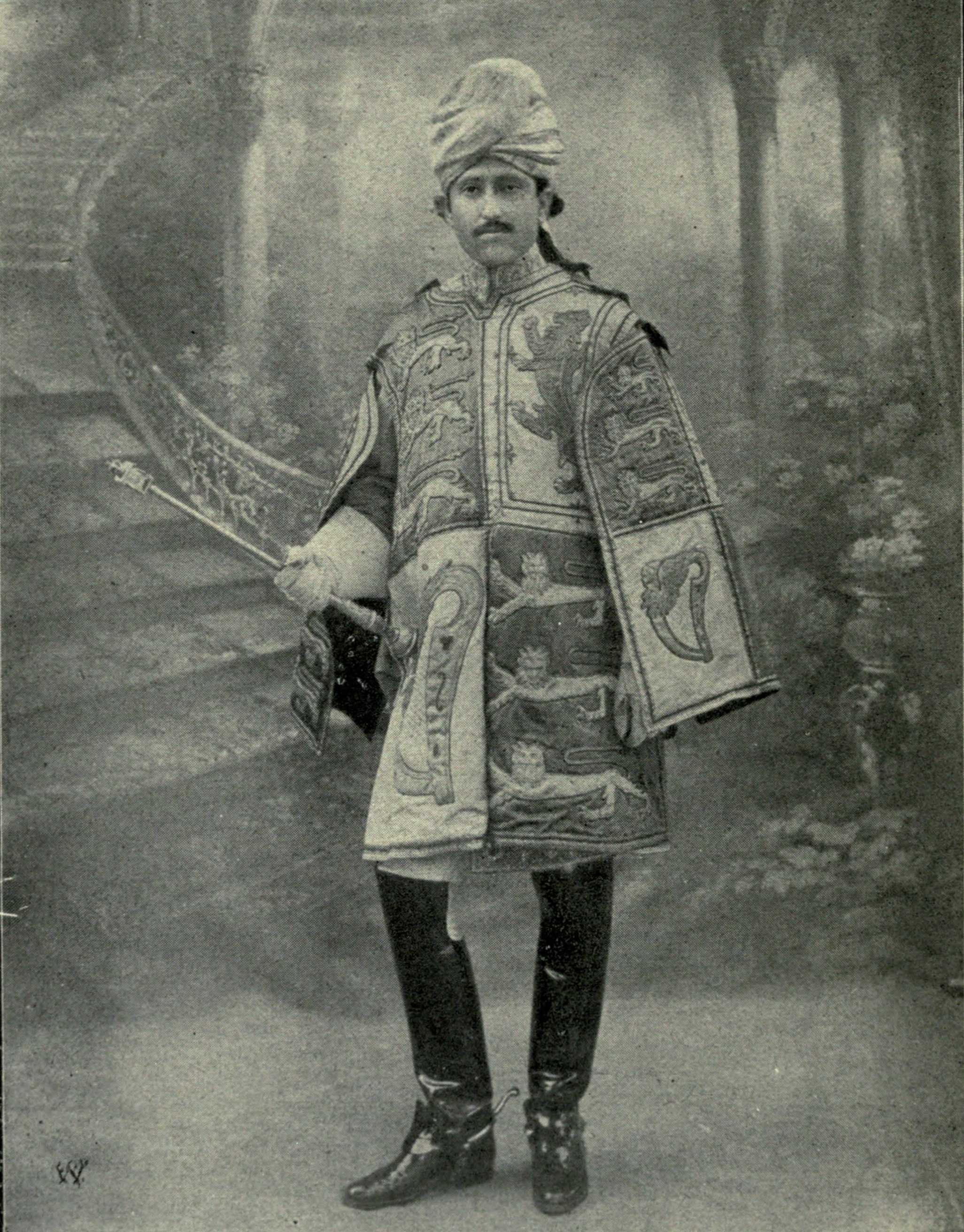
Malik Umar Hayat Khan serving as Assistant Delhi Herald Extraordinary in 1911

== Bibliography ==
- Aldrich, Robert; McCreery, Cindy, eds. (2016). "Chapter 15. A new monarchy for a new commomwealth? Monarchy and the consequences of republican India". Crowns and colonies: European monarchies and overseas empires. Manchester University Press. ISBN 978-1784993153.
- Army, Indian (1877). Soldiers' games: 'Imperial Assemblage'. Delhi, 3rd January, 1877. s. n.
- Codell, Julie, ed. (2011). Power and Resistance: Photography and the Delhi Coronation Durbars. Ahmedabad: Mapin.
- Codell, Julie (2009), "Indian Crafts and Imperial Policy: Hybridity, Purification and Imperial Subjectivities," Material Cultures, 1740–1920: The Meanings and Pleasures of Collecting. Eds. A. Myzelev & J. Potvin. Aldershot: Ashgate, 149–70.
- Codell, Julie (2004), "Gentlemen connoisseurs and capitalists: Modern British Imperial Identity in the 1903 Delhi Durbar Exhibition of Indian Art," Cultural Identities and the Aesthetics of Britishness. Ed.D. Arnold. Manchester U P, 134–63.
- Douglas-Home, Jessica (2011). A Glimpse of Empire. Wilby: Michael Russell.
- Fraser, Lovat (1903). At Delhi (An account of the Delhi Durbar, 1903). Bombay : Times of India Press and Thacker.
- Hobbes, John Oliver (1903). Imperial India; letters from the East (Delhi Durbar). London : T.F. Unwin.
- Menpes, Mortimer (1903). The Durbar (Illustrated). London: A & C Black.
- Coronation Durbar Delhi 1911: Official Directory with Maps. The Superintendent, Government Printing, Calcutta. 1911.
- Supplement to Who's Who in India – Containing lives and photographs of the recipients of honours on 12th December 1911. Newul Kishore Press, Lucknow. 1912.
- Raman and Agrawal, Sunil and Rohit (2012). Delhi Durbar 1911: The Complete Story. Delhi: Roli Books.
- Codell, Julie, ed. (2012). Power and Resistance: The Delhi Coronation Durbars. Ahmedabad: Mapin.
