= Kingdom of Rohilkhand =

Early modern kingdom in North India (1721–1774)

Kingdom of Rohilkhand Katehir
- 1721–1774
- Flag of the Rohilla

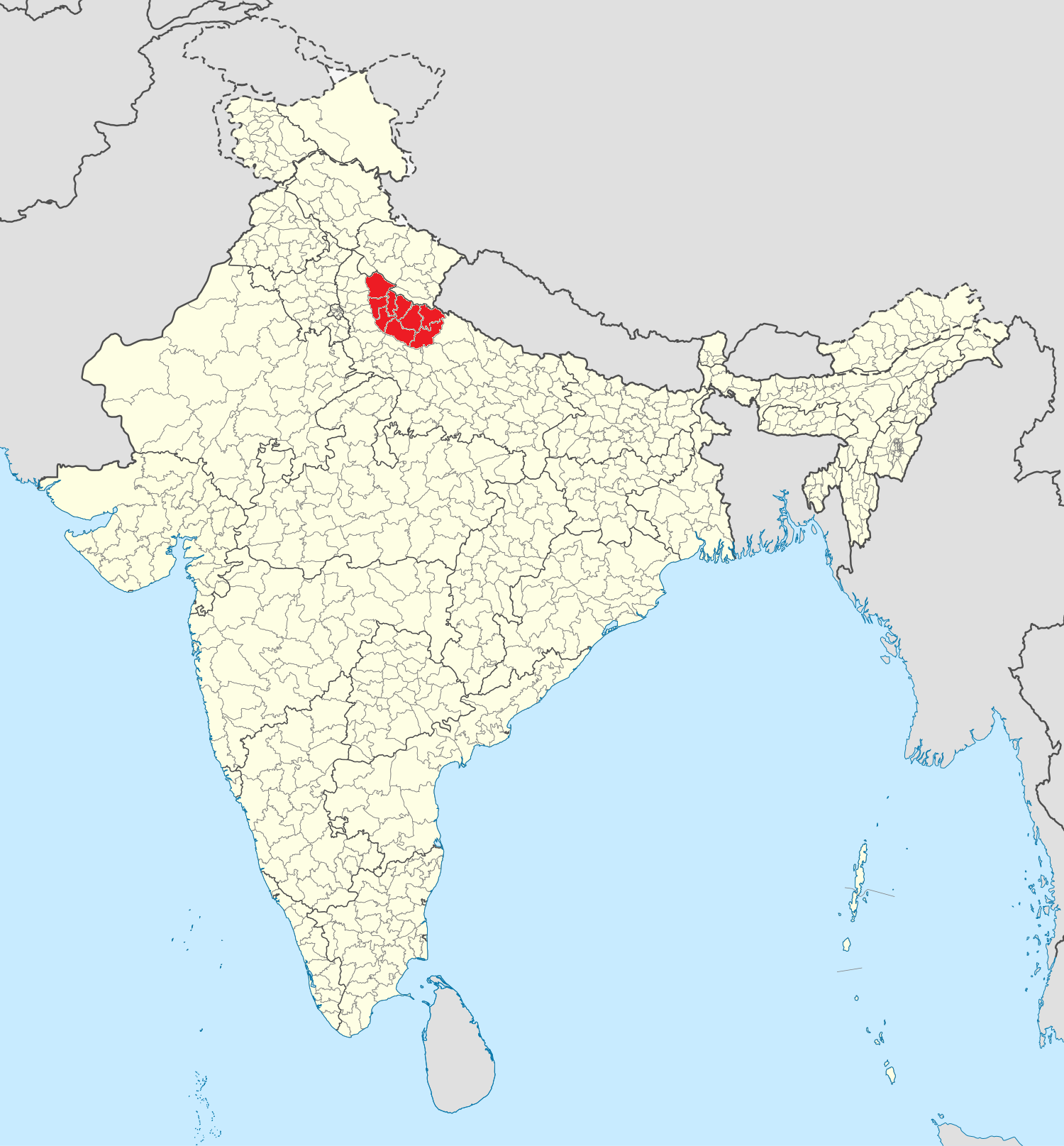
- Rohilkhand in India highlighted
- Capital: Aonla
- Common languages: Official language Persian Unofficial minority languages Urdu, Pashto, Brij Bhasha
- Religion: Islam
- Government: Absolute monarchy
- Nawab
  - 1721–1748: Ali Mohammed Khan
  - 1748–1754: Abdullah Khan
  - 1754–1764: Saadullah Khan
  - 1764–1774: Faizullah Khan
- Regent of Rohilkhand
  - 1748–1774: Hafiz Rehmat Khan Barech
- Legislature: Rohilla council
- History
  - Conquests of Aonla and Barha by Ali Mohammed Khan: 1721
  - First Rohilla War: 1774
Preceded by	Succeeded by
Mughal Empire	Oudh State; Rampur State

The Kingdom of Rohilkhand was a petty kingdom under nominal Mughal suzerainty, that rose under the declining Mughal Empire in 1721 and continued to exist until 1774 when it was defeated by Oudh. The British transformed its significantly reduced borders into the princely state of Rampur.

Nawab Ali Mohammed Khan became the first Nawab of Rohilkhand, having been previously elected as overlord by various Afghan chiefs at the age of fourteen. He would carve out the future kingdom from the collapsing Mughal Empire and go on to the found the Rohilla dynasty. The crown would go on being held by the Rohillas until the kingdom came to an end in 1774, and thereafter the same dynasty would rule over Rampur.

Most of Rohilkhand's borders were established by Ali Mohammed Khan and largely came into existence as a check to the power of Oudh State and in that capacity, Nawab Ali Mohammed was supported by the Wazir ul-Mulk, Qamarudin Khan. Nonetheless, the state grew far more influential with its borders extending to the boundaries of Delhi and Agra. In 1757, the powerful Marathas defeated the Rohillas and Afghans near Delhi and Najib Khan was taken prisoner. In 1772, Rohillas were defeated by a larger Maratha force when they could not repay the debt. Nawab of Oudh invaded Rohilkhand in 1773. Most of the kingdom was annexed at the end of the First Rohilla War into Oudh, when the mismanagement of Hafiz Rehmat Khan along with the internal division of the Rohilla Confederation led to the weakening of central authority.

== Origin ==
Rohilkhand Territory in 1765.

Ali Mohammed Khan was an enterprising soldier who established the kingdom of Rohilkhand. Rohillas are Afghans who migrated to north India during the 17th and 18th centuries. However, the Rohilla dynasty descended from Nawab Ali Muhammed Khan, who was a Jat boy of age eight when he was adopted by the chief of the Barech tribe, Sardar Daud Khan Rohilla. Daud Khan was the son Shah Alam, who belonged to the Barech tribe. After his murder by the raja of Kumaon, Ali Mohammed rose as the 14-year-old leader of his foster father's militia. Due to the role he played in the establishment of Rohilkhand and in the general history of Rohillas, he gained recognition as a Rohilla chief, although he was not Afghan by birth. In the 19th century, descendants of Ali Mohammed Khan, specifically the Nawabs of Rampur, started claiming that he was a Barha Sayyid and began using the title of Sayyid. However, they could not present any pedigree or valid historical proof in the support of this claim. The Nawabs even sought service of a prominent religious leader of Rampur, Najmul Ghani for establishing ancestry from Ali, which was widely rejected.

== History ==
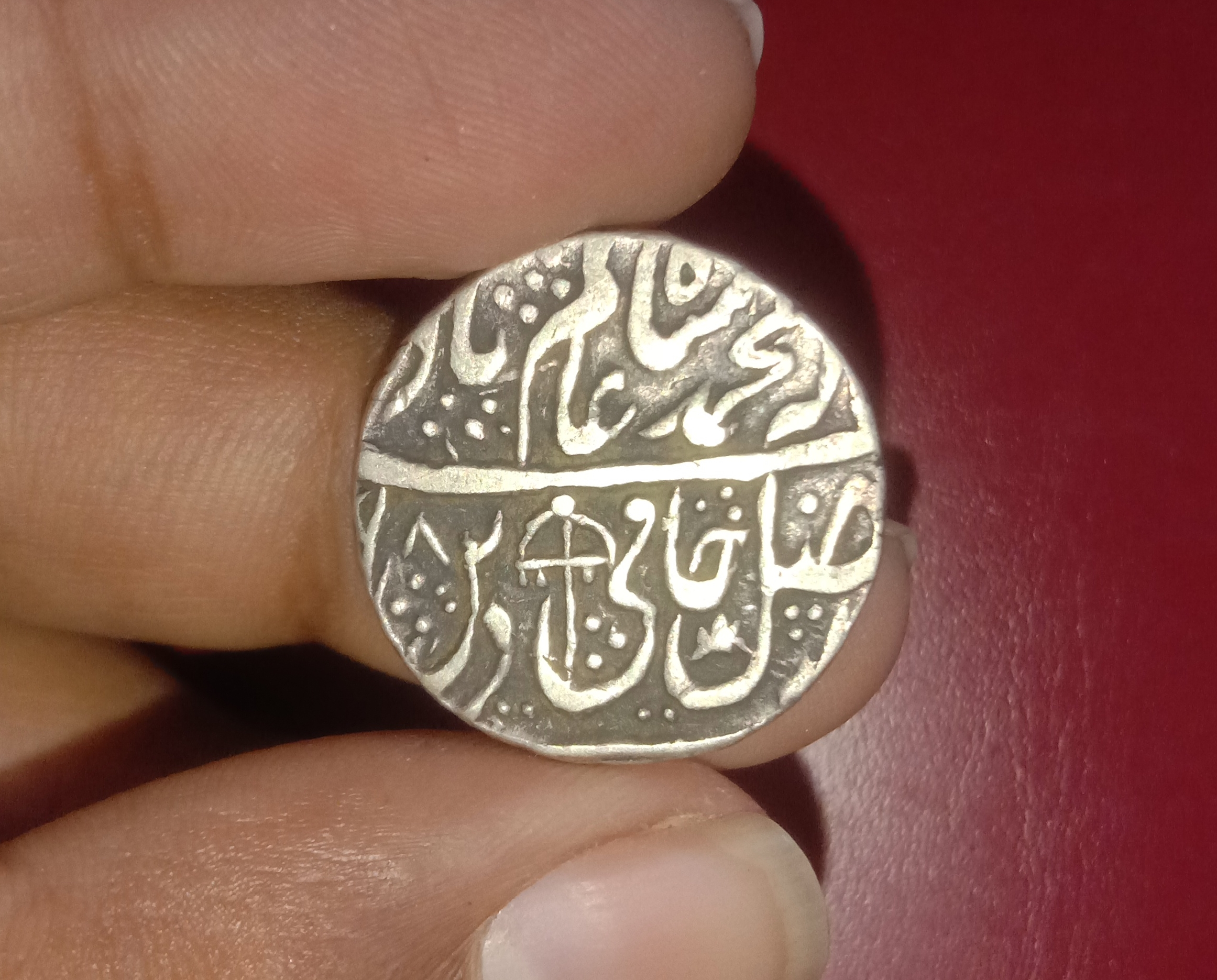
Silver Rupee from the Kingdom of Rohilkhand, minted in Qasba Panipat, struck in the name of Mughal emperor Shah Alam II, with having "saya-e-fazle elah" couplet, Swastika and Parasol marks.

With the death of Aurangzeb and subsequent collapse of administration under the emperor Muhammad Shah, Mughal Authority in the area collapsed, Rohilla immigration increased, although there were descendants of Pathans long domiciled in India. The Mughal authority was further weakened by Nader Shah's invasion of India, allowing Ali Muhammad Khan to extend his power. The Rohillas began to emerge as a mixture of old domiciled Indian Pathan families, Indian converts to Islam and new adventurers from the northwest, who were in the process of developing a real or fictive kinship based on newly forged marriage alliances.

=== Ali Mohammed Khan ===
A man of ability and courage, Ali Mohammed Khan attracted many adventurers by his great reputation and arose as the most powerful man in Katehir. Ali Muhammad Khan distinguished himself by helping in suppressing the rebellion of the powerful Indian Muslim Barha family, who were formerly de facto rulers of the Mughal Empire, and who had under their chief Saifudddin Barha put the Mughal governor Marhamat Khan and all of his followers to death. As a reward Ali Muhammad Khan was given the title of Nawab by Muhammad Shah in 1737. He gained favour with the lower rungs of society and by the invasion of Nadir Shah in 1739 he further strengthened his position attracting a large swath of Afghans who took employment with him. For the subsequent five years, his authority was left unchallenged.

In 1745 a quarrel arose between Ali Mohammed and Safdar Jang the subahdar of Oudh. Retainers of Ali Mohammed seized the property of servants belonging to Safdar Jang. Safdar Jang who was already jealous at the growing power of Ali Mohammad went to the Emperor Muhammad Shah, and through him ordered the return of the confiscated property as well as the arrest of the Rohillas in-charge of the confiscation. After the refusal of Ali Mohammed, Safdar Jang led an Imperial expedition together with the Emperor present in person and after being deserted by his men Ali Mohammed was captured and taken to Delhi.

He was treated honourably and respectfully by the Emperor, in large part due to his influence among his adherent who were still at large. The necessity to consulate Ali Mohammed led to his appointment as Governor of Sirhind (the area between Jummuna and Sutlej).

In 1748 the invasion by Ahmed Shah Abdali allowed Ali Mohammed the opportunity to return to Katehir and re-establish his rule. Upon his return, he was rejoined by most of his former men and soon he was virtually independent in his control of Rohilkhand. To ensure loyalty almost all positions of power were given to Afghan and several like Najib ad-Dawlah received land grants.

=== Rohilla Council ===
On his death-bed Nawab Ali Mohammad Khan made the previously humble and lowly Rohilla, Hafiz Rahmat Khan Barech as Guardian of Rohilkhand until his sons reached majority. Ali Mohammad's cousin Dunde Khan was made Commander-in-chief, Niamut Khan and Silabat Khan were entrusted with the General Administration. Futte Khan who was Ali's favourite retainer was made Khanfaman, while Sirdar Khan was made Bakshi or Paymaster. All of these men were granted districts to rule over as a trust until the majority of his Ali Muhammad children but these trusts were quickly usurped by most of these men upon the death of the Nawab.

Ali Mohammad's capital was Aolna, in the district of Bareilly. After his death in 1749, Rehmat Khan became the 'Hafiz' or chief guardian of his sons during their minority. Ali Mohammad left six sons, Faizullah Khan and Abdullah Khan being elder sons. Before his death, he made arrangements to divide the Kingdom among them and asked Rehmat Khan to make solemn assurance and swore upon Koran to observe the promise. However in 1754, Hafiz Rehmat resolved no longer to regard the pledges and appropriated to themselves most valuable portions of Rohilkhand. The larger share was taken by Hafiz Rehmat and he virtually became the ruler. Smaller districts were assigned to Faizullah Khan and Abdullah Khan, elder sons of Ali Mohammad, and to several influential chiefs. This led to a confederation-like structure of government with the Nawab of Rohilkhand at its head and the Rohilla chiefs in charge of their own Rohilla states answering to him especially in regards to military engagements.

Although the council carried out to an extent its purpose, especially in the form of Najib-ad-Daula who often went to great lengths in securing Rohilkhand's safety and Futtee Khan who remained loyal to the royal family. Ultimately Rehmat Khan and Dundi Khan's machinations won out and Ali Mohammed Khan's children were in large part sidelined in the new government. Hafiz Rehmat died in 1774 Rohilla War and Faizullah Khan, eldest surviving son in the war became the newly acknowledged head. He signed a treaty where he retained his former territory in Rampur. Thus, The Rohilla State of Rampur was established by Nawab Faizullah Khan on 7 October 1774 in the presence of British Commander Colonel Champion, and remained a pliant state under British protection thereafter.

==== Rohilla States ====
The weakening of the central government led to the formation of around a dozen Rohilla states. Four of these states were created during the division of Rohilkhand at the request of the Afghan emperor, Ahmad Shah Durrani, for the sons of Nawab Ali Muhammad Khan:

1. Badaun (Nawab Abdullah Khan)
2. Moradabad (Nawab Saadullah Khan)
3. Rampur (Nawab Faizullah Khan)
4. Bareilly (Nawab Muhammad Yar Khan)

Many Rohilla chiefs also became independent after 1748. Notable Rohilla chieftaincies included:

1. Najibabad (Nawab Najib ad-Dawlah)
2. Farrukhabad (Muhammad Khan Bangash)
3. Pilibhit (Hafiz Rahmat Khan Barech)

=== First Rohilla War ===
Rohillas had sought assistance from the Nawab of Oudh Shuja-ud-Daula in 1772 to expel the Maratha Empire from Rohilkhand. However, they could not pay their debt back and in 1773, the Nawab decided to annexe their country. He appealed to Warren Hastings for assistance, which was given in return for a sum of forty lakhs of rupees. The Rohillas under Hafiz Rahmat Ali Khan were defeated by Colonel Alexander Champion on 23 April 1774 at the Battle of Miranpur Katra. The decisive battle, in which Hafiz Rahmat Khan died, caused the Rohillas to flee to the mountains near Loll Dong. Rohilkhand fell to Awadh, was plundered and occupied. The majority of the Rohillas left. A Rohilla state under British protection was set up in Rampur, and Faizullah Khan managed to become its Nawab. The kingdom of Rohilkhand was abolished, and afterwards became part of Oudh State.

== List of Nawabs ==
Nawab	Relation with previous Nawab	Rule
Formation of Kingdom of Rohilkhand
Nawab Ali Mohammed Khan	Founder	1721–1748
Nawab Abdullah Khan	Son	1748–1754
Nawab Saadullah Khan	Brother	1754–1764
Nawab Faizullah Khan	Brother	1764–1774
Conquest by Oudh. Green row signifies the regency of Hafiz Rahmat Ali Khan.

== Demographics ==
There was an unusually large proportion of Muslim converts who represented a quarter of the population while the majority of the inhabitants were Hindu.
