= Abdullah Khan of Rohilkhand =

Nawab Abdullah Khan Bahadur Rohilla
- Nawab Of Rohilkhand; Nawab Of Badaun; Sardar Of the Barech tribe Chief Of the Rohilla
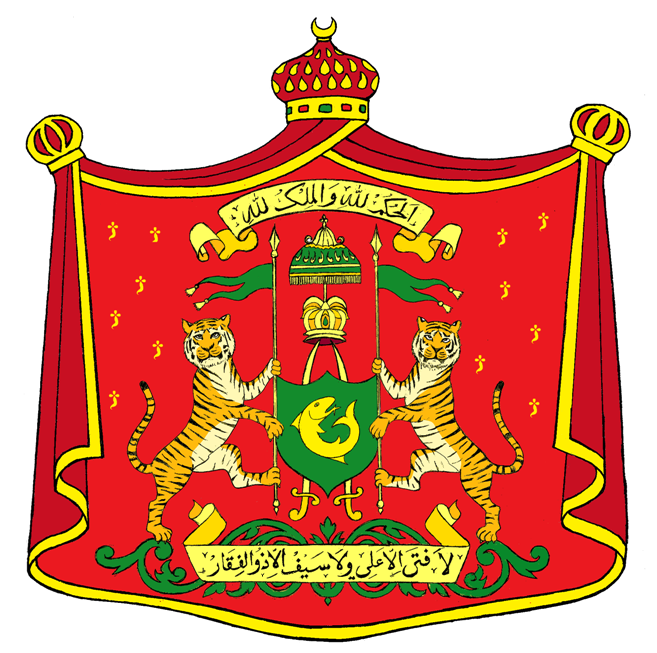
- Rampur Coat of Arms

Nawab of Rohilkhand
- Reign: 1748–1754
- Predecessor: Nawab Ali Mohammad Khan Bahdur Rohilla
- Successor: Nawab Saadullah Khan

Nawab of Badaun
- Reign: 1754–1774
- Successor: Nawab Nasrullah Khan

Chief Of The Rohilla
- Reign: 1764–1794
- Predecessor: Nawab Ali Mohammad Khan Bahdur Rohilla
- Successor: Nawab Saadullah Khan
- Died: 1775
- Issue: Nawab Nasrullah Khan Bahadur Rohilla
Names
- Nawab Abdullah Khan Bahadur Rohilla
- House: Rohilla
- Dynasty: Rohilla
- Father: Ali Mohammad Khan
- Religion: Islam

Nawab Abdullah Khan Bahadur Rohilla (died 1775) was the eldest son of Nawab Ali Muhammad Khan of Rohilkhand and succeeded in absentia to the throne of Rohilkhand and Budaun. He was deposed by the machinations of Hafiz Rehmat Khan and replaced with his younger brother, Nawab Saadullah. Afterwards, he retreated to a spiritual life of an ascetic. He eventually died fighting the British in the Rohilla War.

== Life ==
Abdullah Khan and his younger brother Faizullah Khan were taken as hostages by the Emperor of Persia, Nadir Shah. He remained until 1752 under the authority of the Afghans and was eventually released by Ahmed Shah Abidali.

On his deathbed, his father Ali Mohammad Khan Rohilla made his ministers swear oaths on the Quran to respect his will and to act as protectors of his children until they reached maturity. He appointed Hafiz Rehmat Khan as regent of Rohilkhand until then. However the ministers and regent all reneged on their promises. In 1754 they orchestrated an argument within the royal family and used it as a pretext to usurp the power and wealth of the orphans. Disgusted, Abdullah Khan and his two younger brothers Muhammad Yar Khan and Allah Yar Khan left for Oojanee.

They were invited back and Abdullah Khan was made the Nawab of Badaun, however his prior experiences and continued mistreatment by Hafiz Rehmat Khan led him to adopt a life of religious asceticism. He eventually died fighting the British in the Rohilla War.

== See also ==
- Kingdom of Rohilkhand
