= Zia Ullah Khan =

Senior officer of the Pakistan Army

Lt. Gen. Zia Ullah Khan HI

Personal details
- Born: 24 September 1938
- Died: 13 July 2016 (aged 77) Lahore, Punjab, Pakistan
- Relations: Gen. Ghulam Jilani Khan
- Education: National Defense University

Military service
- Allegiance: Pakistan
- Branch/service: Pakistan Army
- Rank: Lieutenant-General
- Unit: 10th Baluch Regiment
- Battles/wars: Indo-Pakistani War of 1965; Indo-Pakistani War of 1971

Zia Ullah Khan (24 September 1938 – 13 May 2016) was a retired Leiutene General of the Pakistan Army who served as a corps commander of XII Corps from January 1993 – 1995 and commandant Azad Kashmir Regiment. He had made various contributions in the military and civil development in Pakistan, especially in Balochistan for which he came to be highly respected in both circles. He was known for his courage to urge Pervez Musharraf to step down after the 1999 Pakistani coup d'état.

He was awarded the Hilal-i-Imtiaz Military for the recognition of his services, which is the second-highest civilian award and honour given to both civilians and military officers of the Pakistan armed forces by the Government of Pakistan. It recognises individuals who have made an "especially meritorious contribution to the security or national interests of Pakistan, world peace, cultural or other significant public endeavors". He also served as the Mayo Hospital board of governors' chairman and Fauji Fertilizer Company Limited Managing Director.

== Background ==
Zia Ullah Khan was born into a Barech Pathan family in Jandiala Sher Khan, a small town near Sheikhupura that is also the ancestral village of the famous Sufi poet Waris Shah. His father was Khan Moiz Ullah Khan, a renowned personality of the same village.

He was also the nephew of General Ghulam Jilani Khan, former Defense Secretary of Pakistan and Governor of Punjab.
