= Chand Bagh =

Chand Bagh, or Chandbagh, may refer to

- Chand Bagh School, an independent boarding school for boys in Pakistan
- The Chand Bagh campus, home of the Doon School of Dehradun, India
- The Chand Bagh estate, home of the Isabella Thoburn College of Lucknow, India
