= Ali Mohammed Khan =

Nawab of Rohilkhand (c. 1707–1748)

Nawab Ali Mohammed Khan Bahadur Rohilla
- Nawab of Katehir; Nawab of Badaun; Nawab of Rampur; Nawab of Bareilly; Nawab of Moradabad; Nawab of Aonla; Sardar of the Barech tribe Chief of the Rohilla

Rohilkhand
- Reign: 1721–1748
- Predecessor: Sardar Daud Khan Rohilla
- Successor: Nawab Abdullah Khan

Badaun
- Reign: 1721–1748
- Predecessor: Sardar Daud Khan Rohilla
- Successor: Nawab Abdullah Khan

Rampur
- Reign: 1741–1748
- Predecessor: Raja Ram Singh of Katehr
- Successor: Nawab Faizullah Khan

Bareilly
- Reign: 1741–1748
- Predecessor: Nawab Abd Un Nabi Khan
- Successor: Nawab Muhammad Yar Khan

Moradabad
- Reign: 1741–1748
- Predecessor: Raja Harnand
- Successor: Nawab Sa'adullah Khan

Aonla
- Reign: 1721–1748
- Successor: Nawab Abdullah Khan
- Born: Prem Singh; 1707; Jansath
- Died: 15 September 1748 (aged 40–41); Aonla
- Burial: Aonla
Regnal name
- Ali Muhammad Khan
- House: Rohilla (by adoption from Nain/Nano Jats)
- Religion: Sunni Islam
- Occupation: Subahdar of Sirhind and Rohilkhand

Ali Muhammad Khan (c. 1707 – 15 September 1748), born as Prem Singh Nain, was the founder of the Kingdom of Rohilkhand, and progenitor of the Rohilla dynasty. He succeeded his foster father, Daud Khan Barech, as chief of the Rohillas at the age of fourteen, and was generally regarded as a non-oppressive ruler to the masses.

His early death led to the regency of Hafiz Rahmat Khan Barech, despite Rehmat Khan's solemn oath on the Qur'an to fulfill the dying Ali Muhammad's will.

== Early life ==
Ali Muhammad Khan, originally named Prem Singh Nain, was born around 1707 into a Jat family. (Note: Abdur Rashid notes that while the rest of the sources describe him as a Jat, one source states that he was an Ahir. Jos J. L. Gommans also notes that he is mostly described as a Jat or an Ahir in contemporary sources. Iqbal Husain states, "It is acknowledged on all hands that 'Ali Muḥammad Khan was not an Afghan. That he was a Saiyed is at best dubious; that he was a Jat, or of some other local peasant caste is more than probable.") As a child, he was captured by Daud Khan Barech, the Barech chief, during a conflict with rival zamindars. Impressed by the boy, Daud chose to adopt him, convert him to Islam, and give him a new name.

According to the Inradus Sa'adat, Ali was a Hanafi Muslim belonging to the Qadiri Sufi Order, which was considered by them to be more closer to pure Islam than any other mystic order prevailing in India.

== Reign ==
He succeeded Daud Khan and develop Rohilkhand into a powerful nation, which became independent in 1721. Ali Muhammad Khan distinguished himself by helping in suppressing the rebellion of the Barha family under the chief Saifudddin Barha who had put the Mughal governor Marhamat Khan and all of his followers to death. As a reward Ali Muhammad Khan was given the title of Nawab by Muhammad Shah in 1737. In 1746, due to an altercation over the collection of wood between the construction workers of Safdar Jang with the forest guards of Ali Muhammad Khan, Safdar Jang decided to eliminate him. Safdar Jang of Oudh informed the Mughal emperor Muhammad Shah (ruled 1719–1748), through Qamar-ud-Din Khan about Ali Mohammed Khan's supposed intentions to create his own sultanate. Mohammed Shah sent an expedition against him, as a result of which Muhammad Khan was imprisoned. Later he was pardoned and made governor of Sirhind. After Nadir Shah, the conqueror of Iran, took control of Kabul and sacked Delhi in 1739, Ali Mohammed Khan returned to his homeland and ruled the independent state of Rohilkhand until his death in 1748.

Faizullah Khan was the second son of Ali Muhammad Khan. He assumed rule of the Rohillas after Nawab Saidullah Khan.

== Descendants ==
In the 19th century, the descendants of Ali, specifically the Nawabs of Rampur, claimed he was a Barha Sayyid and began using the title of Sayyid. However, they could not present any pedigree or valid historical proof to support this claim. The Nawabs even hired a prominent maulvi of Rampur, Najmul Ghani, for establishing ancestry from Ali ibn Abi Talib, which was generally rejected.

The following is a list of his children:

- Nawab Abdullah Khan, first son from his wife Marghalari Begum (from Matni tribe)
- Nawab Faizullah Khan, second son from his wife Marghalari Begum, would later found the Rampur State
- Nawab Saadullah Khan, from his wife Sarah Begum (of Bunerwal)
- Nawab Muhammad Yar Khan, son from his wife Lado Begum
- Nawab Alah-Yar Khan, son from his wife Raj Begum. He died of consumption around the same time that his younger brother Murtaza died.
- Murtaza Khan, son. Disgusted by Hafiz Rehmat Khan's unfair treatment, he left for Secunderabad where he died.
- Shah Begum, daughter, from wife Marghalari Begum (wife of Inayat Khan son of Hafiz Rehmat Khan)
- Niyaz Begum, daughter [and wife of Shah Muhammad Khan brother of Hafiz Rehmat Khan]
- Masoom Begum, daughter, [and wife of Zabita Khan]
- Inayat Begum, daughter, [wife of Bahadur Khan Kamal Zai]
- a daughter, name unknown, who died in childhood and was engaged to a son of Qamar-ud-din Khan

== See also ==
- Muslim Jats
