= Noumahla Masjid =

Mosque in Uttar Pradesh, India

- Location of the mosque in Uttar Pradesh

Religion
- Affiliation: Sunni Islam
- Ecclesiastical or organizational status: Mosque
- Status: Active

Location
- Location: Noumhla Mohalla, Bareilly district, Uttar Pradesh
- Country: India
- Interactive map of Noumahla Masjid
- Coordinates: 28°21′27″N 79°24′59″E

Architecture
- Type: Mosque architecture
- Style: Indo-Islamic
- Founder: Nawab Hafiz Rahmat Khan Barech; Syed Shahji Baba
- Established: 1749 CE
- Completed: 1906

Specifications
- Dome: Three (maybe more)
- Minaret: Two
- Materials: Concrete

The Noumahla Masjid (Urdu: نو محلہ مسجد), also spelled as the Noumahillah Masjid, is an historical Sunni mosque, located in Noumhla Mohalla, in the Bareilly district of the state of Uttar Pradesh, India. The mosque was established in 1749 by Nawab Hafiz Rahmat Khan Barech, handed over to Syed Shaji Baba, and its concrete construction was completed in 1906.

== History ==
When the flames of the first revolution flared up in 1857, the community of Rohilkhand joined the freedom struggle. At that time the revolutionaries were led by Nawab Khan Bahadur Khan and he made Naumhala Mosque as his headquarters. Revolutionaries used to meet at the mosque and developed the strategy of Jung-e-Azadi that was used against the British Raj, inspired by the sermons of Maulvi Mahmood Hasan.

The Islamic Research Center reported that the caretakers of the mosque claimed that the Noumahla Masjid was the main stronghold of the revolutionaries and at the mosque a strategy was made against the British. When the British discovered the strategy, they attacked the mosque and here Ismail Shah was martyred while giving azaan. Along with this, to save their pride from the British, all the women jumped into the well and gave their lives. The caretakers claim that all the revolutionaries are buried adjacent to the mosque.

== See also ==
- Islam in India
- List of mosques in India
