= Barech =

Durrani Pashtun tribe of Kandahar province

Barech tribesmen being recruited into the British Army, 1905

Barech (Pashto: بارېچه) also Kabila-e-Barech, Baraich, Bareach, Barreach, Baraech, Bahrytch, is a Pashtun tribe originating from the Kandahar province of Afghanistan. The Barech live primarily in Shorawak District and in multiple parts of Pakistan, such as Noshki, Quetta, Lahore, Sheikhupura, and Jandiala Sher Khan. Folklore mentions that the tribe descends from an individual named Barech, who was the son of Sharafuddin. They share many similarities with neighboring tribes such as the Tareen and Shirani. Over the span of many centuries, the Barech tribe moved from Kandahar towards the Balochistan and Punjab regions where they settled and became successful farmers, businessmen, and military leaders. The modern-day Barech population is estimated to number around 60,000, with the majority of them residing in Pakistan.

== History ==
Judge Rozi Khan Barrech shown above

The Barech people originated from Shorawak District, with many of them leading a nomadic lifestyle. Certain groups went to various locations throughout South Asia, leading to the founding of subtribes amongst the Barech tribe. Groups that migrated to Kandahar became known as the Zakozai subtribe. Tribesmen that went to Quetta and Noshki became the heads of the Mandozai subtribe. The group that migrated further east towards Lahore and Sheikhupura founded the Daoudzai subtribe.

Image of Hafiz Rahmat Khan Barech shown above

Barech tribesmen that settled in eastern Punjab during the Lodi Dynasty in the 16th century would later establish the princely state of Pataudi in 1804, with Faiz Talab Khan becoming the first Nawab of Pataudi. Barech people have been mentioned to have historically been found as east as Rohilkhand as many tribesmen served as soldiers in the invasions launched by Babur, Aurangzeb, Daud Khan, Ahmad Shah Durrani, and Hafiz Rahmat Khan Barech into contemporary northern India.

In both the First and Second World Wars, the British Indian Army heavily recruited Barech tribesmen into the 10th Baluch Regiment. Hence, Barech soldiers participated in notable engagements and campaigns such as the First and Second Battle of Ypres, the North-West Frontier Theater, Battle of Singapore, the North Africa Campaign, Battle of Sicily, Battle of Imphal, and the Burma Campaign.

Ghulam Jilani Khan pictured above.

The Barech have been involved in South Asia in many aspects of life. The tribe has produced notable military commanders and politicians such as Hafiz Rahmat Khan Barech, Ghulam Jilani Khan, Zia Ullah Khan, and Sher Ali Khan Pataudi.

Several Islamic scholars such as Naqi Ali Khan and Ahmad Raza Khan, the founder of the Barelvi movement, also belonged to the Barech tribe.

In India, the Pataudi family would go on to become a key part of the Bollywood show business industry with figures such as Saif Ali Khan becoming major actors. Additionally, Mansoor Ali Khan Pataudi and Iftikhar Ali Khan Pataudi were two famous cricketers that hailed from the Barech tribe as well.

== Subtribes ==
- Badalzai, see Shaikh Shahab-ud-din Badalzai, grandfather of Shah Alam Badalzai, the master of Daoud Khan Rohilla
- Daoudzai, mainly found in Sheikhupura, Jandiala Sher Khan, and Lahore
- Mandozai, also known as Chagai, mainly found in Quetta and Noshki
- Zakozai, mainly found in Helmand Province, Afghanistan
- Pataudi, mainly found in Pataudi

== Notable personalities ==
- Hafiz Rahmat Khan Barech - Afghan Warrior who fought to Victory in the Battle of Panipat and died in the Rohilla War
- Ghulam Jilani Khan - Former Defense Secretary of Pakistan, Governor of Punjab, and Director General of the ISI
- Zia Ullah Khan - Former Lieutenant General in the Pakistan Army, recipient of the Hilal-i-Imtiaz
- Justice Rozi Khan Barrech - Former Chief Justice of Balochistan High Court and the current Justice of Federal Constitutional Court of Pakistan
- Sher Ali Khan Pataudi - Major General in the Pakistan Army, ambassador to Yugoslavia, recipient of the Hilal-i-Jurrat
- Naqi Ali Khan - Islamic scholar
- Ahmad Raza Khan - Islamic scholar and jurist
- Hassan Raza Khan - Indian scholar and poet
- Mustafa Raza Khan - Indian scholar
- Hamid Raza Khan - Indian scholar
- Tauqeer Raza Khan - Indian politician
- Kaif Raza Khan - Indian scholar
- Saif Ali Khan - Indian actor
- Sara Ali Khan - Indian actress
- Soha Ali Khan - Indian actress
- Saba Ali Khan - Indian jewelry designer
- Mansoor Ali Khan Pataudi - Indian cricketer
- Iftikhar Ali Khan Pataudi - Indian cricketer

== See also ==
- Kandahar
- Quetta
- Lahore
- Sheikhupura
- Jandiala Sher Khan
- Pataudi
- Rohilkhand
- Nawab of Pataudi
- 10th Baluch Regiment

== Bibliography ==
- A. G. Hastings, Tarikh-e-peshawar (Tarikh-e-peshawar. ed.), Lahore: Globe Publishers, OL 13853859M
- Muhammad Hayat Khan (20 April 1999), Afghanistan and Its Inhabitants, Sang-e-Meel Publications, ISBN 978-969-35-0886-4, OL 13126308M, 9693508866
