= Reg Alaqadari =

Village in Kandahar Province, Afghanistan

- Location in Afghanistan
- Coordinates: 29°43′48″N 65°41′29″E
- Country: Afghanistan
- Province: Kandahar Province
- District: Reg District
- Elevation: 2,999 ft (914 m)
- Time zone: UTC+4:30

Reg Alaqadari (Pashto: د ریګ علاقه داري) is a village and the center of Reg District in Kandahar Province of Afghanistan. It is connected by highway with Shorabak District to the east and Garmsir District in neighboring Helmand Province to the west. Security in and around the village is provided by the Afghan National Police, which includes the Afghan Border Police.

The village of Reg Alaqadari is located on 29.7300°N 65.6914°E at 914 metres (2,999 ft) altitude, a few miles north of Nushki District in Balochistan, Pakistan. The population of the area is predominantly Pashto-speaking ethnic Baloch people.

== See also ==
- Transport in Afghanistan
