= Malka Hans =

City in Punjab, Pakistan

Malka Hans ملکہ ہانس
- City
- Location in Punjab Location in Pakistan
- Coordinates: 30°25′26.4″N 73°16′33.6″E
- Country: Pakistan
- Province: Punjab
- District: Pakpattan
- Tehsil: Pakpattan
- Elevation: 150 m (490 ft)

Population (2025)
  - Total: 58,171
- Time zone: UTC+05:00 (PST)

Malka Hans (Punjabi, Urdu: ملکہ ہانس), is a historical city of Punjab in Pakistan. It is located 12 kilometers north of Pakpattan in the Pakpattan District.

== History ==
Waris Shah, a Punjabi sufi poet came here from his native village Jandiala Sher Khan and composed the classic Punjabi epic Heer in 1766. There is a mosque related to the poet as well as his composition. Moulvi Sh. Abdullah who wrote BaaraaN Anwaa, a famous Punjabi book on fiqh, also belonged to Malka Hans. He came to Lahore and lived in Sheran Wali Gali inside Lohari darwaza, where Mian Muhammad Bakhsh stayed for three months. Mian Muhammad Bakhsh wrote 64 couplets about him at the end of his famous Punjabi Sufi poetry book Saiful Maluk. (Edited by Prof. Saeed Ahmad, Rwp).

== Geography ==
Malka Hans is located at 30°25′26.4″N 73°16′33.6″E at an altitude of 150 metres (490 ft). It is located on the Pakpattan-Sahiwal road, approximately 15 km from Pakpattan and 34 km from Sahiwal.
