= Jandiala (disambiguation) =

Jandiala may refer to:

- Jandiala, a village in Jalandhar district in the Indian state of Punjab.
- Jandiala Guru, a town in the Amritsar district of Eastern Punjab (India)
- Jandiala Sher Khan, a town of Sheikhupura District in the Punjab province of Pakistan
