= Muhammad Yar Khan of Bareilly =

Nawab Muhammad Yar Khan Bahadur Rohilla
- Nawab Of Bareilly
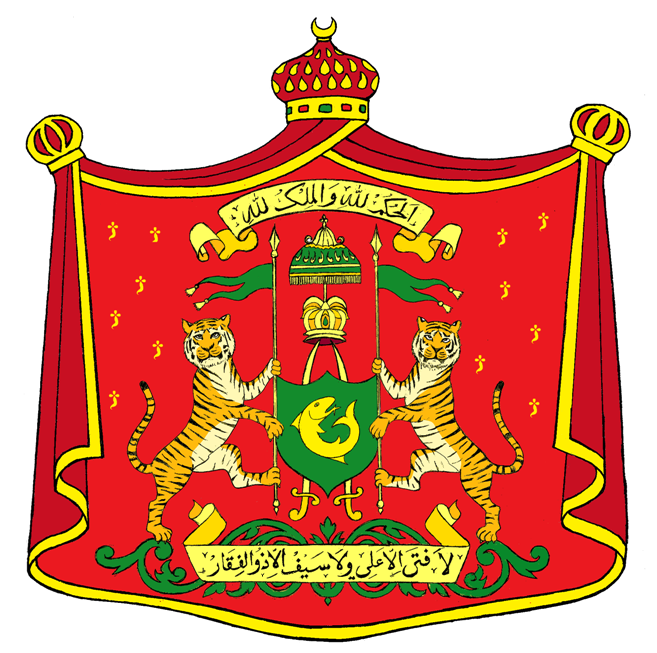
- Rampur Coat of Arms

Nawab of Bareilly
- Predecessor: Ali Mohammad khan
- Regent: Hafiz Rehmat Khan
- Died: 1774
Names
- Nawab Muhammad Yar Khan Bahadur Rohilla
- House: Rohilla
- Father: Ali Mohammad Khan
- Mother: Lado Begum
- Religion: Islam

Nawab Muhammad Yar Khan Bahadur Rohilla (died 23 April 1774) was the fourth son of Nawab Ali Muhammad Khan and upon the division of his father's realms he was made the Nawab of Bareilly.

== Life ==
On his deathbed, his father Ali Mohammad Khan Rohilla made his ministers swear oaths on the Quran to respect his will and to act as protectors of his children until they reached maturity. He appointed Hafiz Rehmat Khan as regent of Rohilkhand until then. However the ministers and regent all reneged on their promises. In 1754 they orchestrated an argument within the royal family and used it as a pretext to usurp the power and wealth of the orphans. Disgusted, he along with his older brother Abdullah Khan and younger Allah Yar Khan left for Oojanee.

He was killed while fighting the British in the First Rohilla War.
