= Battle of Miranpur Katra =

1774 battle

Date	23 April 1774
Location	Miranpur Katra,
Result	Anglo-Oudh victory

Belligerents
Oudh State; British East India Company	Kingdom of Rohilkhand

Commanders and leaders
Cl. Alexander Champion; Shuja-ud-Daula	Hafiz Rahmat Khan Barech †

Strength
11,000 troops 15–18 artillery pieces	28,000 troops 60 artillery pieces

Casualties and losses
Total: 386: 39 Company troops killed, 93 wounded.; 80 Oudh troops killed, 174 wounded.	Estimated at 2,000

The Battle of Miranpur Katra was the decisive military engagement between the Oudh State and the British East India Company against the Kingdom of Rohilkhand in the First Rohilla War.
