= Kamil Khan Mumtaz =

Pakistani architect

- Born: 1939 (age 86–87)
- Education: Architectural Association School of Architecture, London
- Occupations: Architect; educator; author
- Awards: Tamgha-e-Imtiaz (1993); Sitara-e-Imtiaz (2022)

Kamil Khan Mumtaz (born 1939) is a Pakistani architect, educator, and writer, known for his work in integrating traditional Islamic and regional architectural principles with contemporary design. He has been influenced by the Traditionalist School, especially by Martin Lings, whom he knew personally. He is considered one of the key figures in developing a distinct identity for modern architecture in Pakistan. He also served as the head of the National College of Arts (NCA) in Lahore and is a founding member of the Society for the Environmental Protection of Pakistan.

== Early life and education ==
Kamil Khan Mumtaz was born in 1939. He received his early education at a convent school in Murree, followed by his A-Levels at Aitchison College, Lahore. He studied at the Architectural Association School of Architecture in London from 1957 to 1963, where he was trained in modernist traditions. After returning to Pakistan, he began teaching and practicing architecture in Lahore. He has been a member of several architecture juries and has widely lectured in Europe and Asia. In 1985, he authored Architecture in Pakistan, a Concept Media Publication.

== Career ==
In 1966, Mumtaz was appointed as the principal of the National College of Arts (NCA), Lahore. Over the following decades, he became a prominent voice in architectural education, environmental design, and heritage preservation in Pakistan. He emphasized the revival of traditional building techniques, sustainable materials, and the cultural spirit of place in design philosophy.

== Architectural philosophy ==
Mumtaz believes that architecture is not merely the construction of buildings but the creation of a "spirit of place" that reflects the culture, climate, and values of its society. His architectural thought is characterized by:

- Use of indigenous materials such as brick, lime, timber, and stone
- Integration of courtyards, natural light, and ventilation
- Harmonizing modern needs with traditional aesthetics
- A strong emphasis on environmental sustainability and cultural continuity

He has often described his approach as an attempt to reconcile the spiritual and material dimensions of modern life through architecture.

== Notable works ==
- Kot Karamat Village, Lahore – A residential project combining vernacular architecture with contemporary needs.
- Oxford University Press Headquarters, Karachi – A modern structure rooted in traditional brickwork aesthetics.
- Har Sukh Mansion in Bedian (outside of Lahore)
- Pak Vigah Mosque, Mangowal
- The Shrine of Baba Hasan Din, Lahore
- Chand Bagh School
- Several schools, rural projects, and urban design initiatives integrating local craftsmanship and ecological sensitivity.

== Publications ==
Kamil Khan Mumtaz has authored two books on architecture and culture:

- Architecture in Pakistan (1985)
- Modernity and Tradition (1999)

These works have been used as references for understanding South Asian architectural identity.

== Awards and recognition ==
- Sitara-e-Imtiaz (Star of Excellence) award by the President of Pakistan in 2019
- Tamgha-e-Imtiaz in 1993
- Honorary awards and recognitions from the National College of Arts for educational and professional services.
- Keynote speaker at several international conferences on heritage and environmental architecture.

== Legacy ==
Kamil Kahn Mumtaz is widely credited with reintroducing the notion that modern buildings in Pakistan can retain a traditional identity and cultural relevance. He trained many architects who went on to hold positions in academic and professional settings. His influence can be seen in the resurgence of vernacular elements and sustainable design in contemporary Pakistani architecture.
