= Reg District, Kandahar =

Reg ریګ ولسوالی
- District
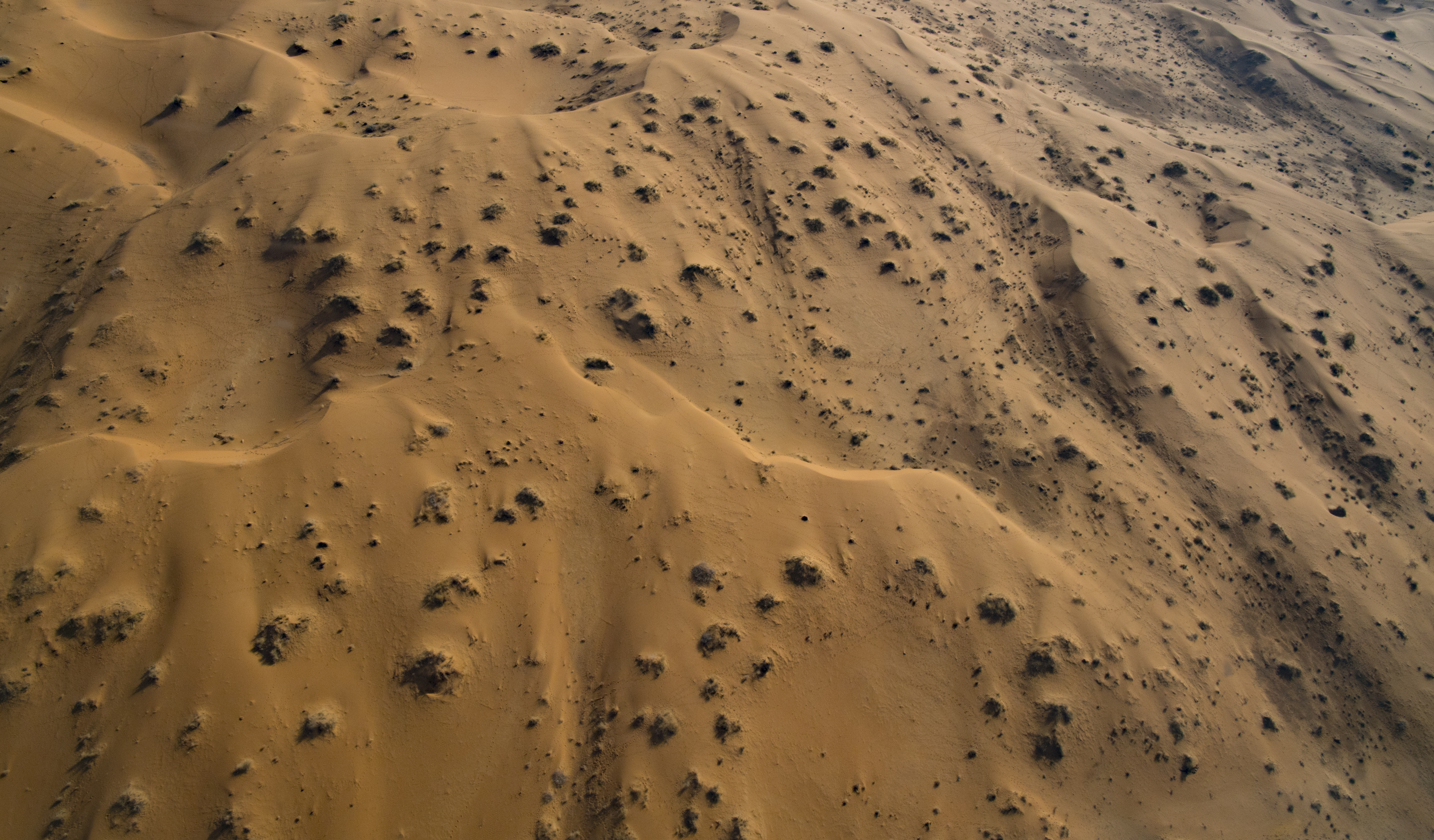
- Aerial photography of Reg District in Kandahar Province of Afghanistan

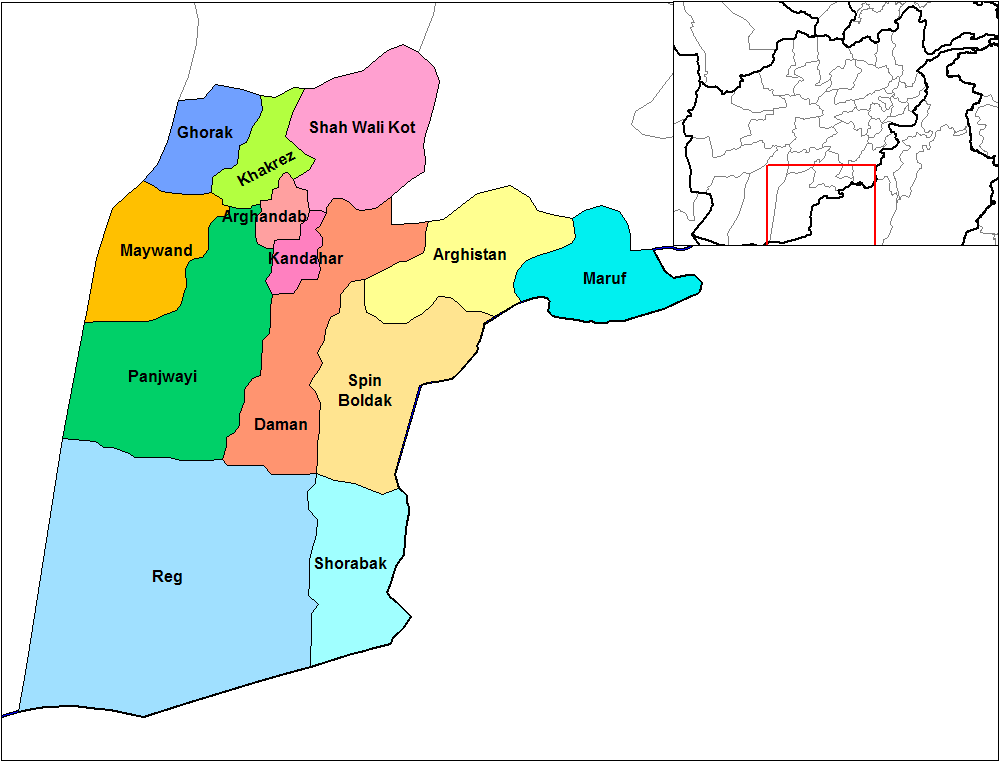

- Location in Afghanistan
- Coordinates: 30°13′39″N 65°12′42″E
- Country: Afghanistan
- Province: Kandahar
- Capital: Reg Alaqadari

Government
  - Type: District

Population (2025)
  - Total: 11,004
- Time zone: UTC+04:30 (Afghanistan Time)

Reg District (Pashto: ریګ ولسوالی), also called Registan District, is one of the 13 districts of Kandahar Province in southern Afghanistan. It is located in the southwestern part of the province, bordering Helmand Province to the west, Panjwai and Daman districts to the north, Shorabak District to the east and Chagai District in Balochistan, Pakistan, to the south.

According to Afghanistan's National Statistics and Information Authority, the district of Reg has an estimated population of 11,004 people. They are mostly Baloch and Pashtun tribes. The district center is the village Reg Alaqadari, which is located in the most southeastern part of the district - a few miles north from the Durand Line (Afghanistan-Pakistan border).

Security in and around the district is maintained by the Afghan National Police and Afghan Armed Forces. It is mostly a desert and there are only a few larger settlements. There is a small official border checkpoint in the district, near the Afghanistan-Pakistan border crossing. It is used by some of the Afghans in Pakistan to enter Afghanistan.

== See also ==
- Districts of Afghanistan
- Geography of Afghanistan
- Transport in Afghanistan
