= Saadullah Khan of Rohilkhand =

Nawab Saadullah Khan Bahadur Rohilla
- Nawab Of Rohilkhand; Nawab of Moradabad; Nawab of Jalesar; Nawab of Faizabad; Chief of the Rohilla
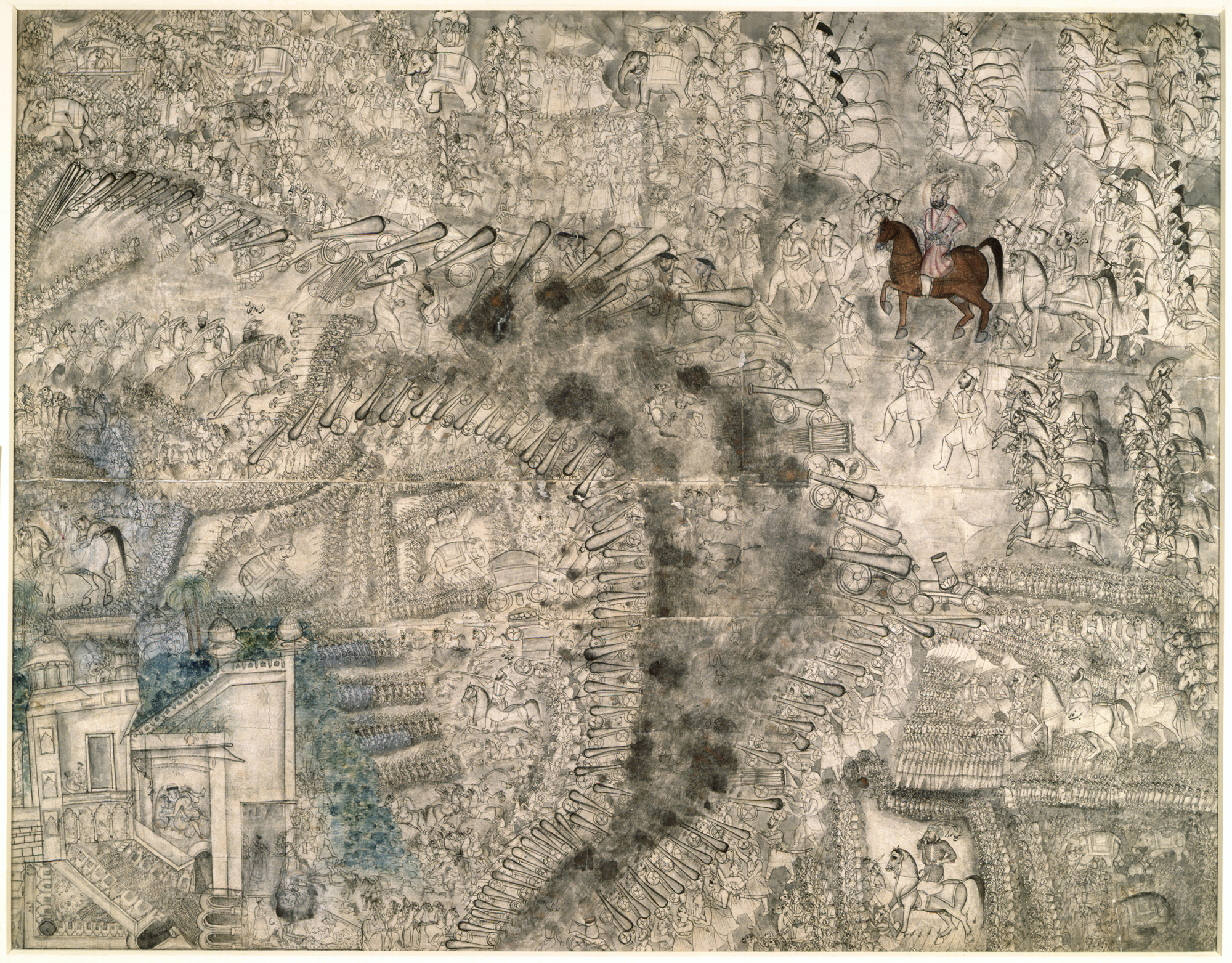
- Saadullah Khan accompanying Ahmed Shah Abidali in the Third Battle of Panipat

Nawab of Rohilkhand
- Reign: 1754–1764
- Predecessor: Abdullah Khan of Rohilkhand
- Successor: Faizullah Khan
- Regent: Hafiz Rehmat Khan

Chief of the Rohilla
- Reign: 1754–1764
- Predecessor: Abdullah Khan of Rohilkhand
- Successor: Faizullah Khan

Nawab of Moradabad
- Reign: 1748–1754
- Predecessor: Ali Mohammad Khan

Nawab of Jalesar and Faizabad
- Reign: 1758–1764
- Predecessor: Ahmed Shah Durrani
- Died: 1764
- Burial: Ali Mohammed Khan Maqbara, Aonla
Names
- Nawab Saadullah Khan Bahadur Rohilla
- House: Rohilla (by Adoption); Barha
- Father: Ali Mohammad Khan
- Mother: Sarah Begum
- Religion: Islam

Nawab Abdullah Khan Bahadur Rohilla (died 1775) was the third son of Nawab Ali Muhammad Khan of Rohilkhand and succeed his brother to the throne of Rohilkhand.

== Life ==
On his death bed, his father Ali Mohammad Khan Rohilla made his ministers swear oaths on the Quran to respect his will and to act as protectors of his children until they reached maturity. Saadullah Khan, Allah Yar Khan and Muhammad Yar Khan were young children at the time of his passing and the elder two brothers were away, taken as hostages by Ahmed Shah Abidali. Ali Mohammed Khan appointed Hafiz Rehmat Khan as regent of Rohilkhand until either the return of Abdullah Khan or the maturity of Saadullah Khan. However the ministers and regent all renegade on their promises.

After the return of Abdullah Khan, they initially made Saadullah Khan the Nawab of Moradabad but later they orchestrated an argument within the royal family and used it as a pretext to usurp the power and wealth of the orphans. Saadullah Khan was installed as a ruler to replace his elder brother Abdullah Khan, but despite his high spirits he was repeatedly blocked by Hafiz Rehmat Khan's machinations and retired in disgust to Aonla.

He fought with Ahmed Shah Abidali in the Third Panipat War and received by him Jalesar and Faizabad as rewards for his service.
