= Jama Masjid, Pilibhit =

Mosque in Uttar Pradesh, India

Jama Masjid
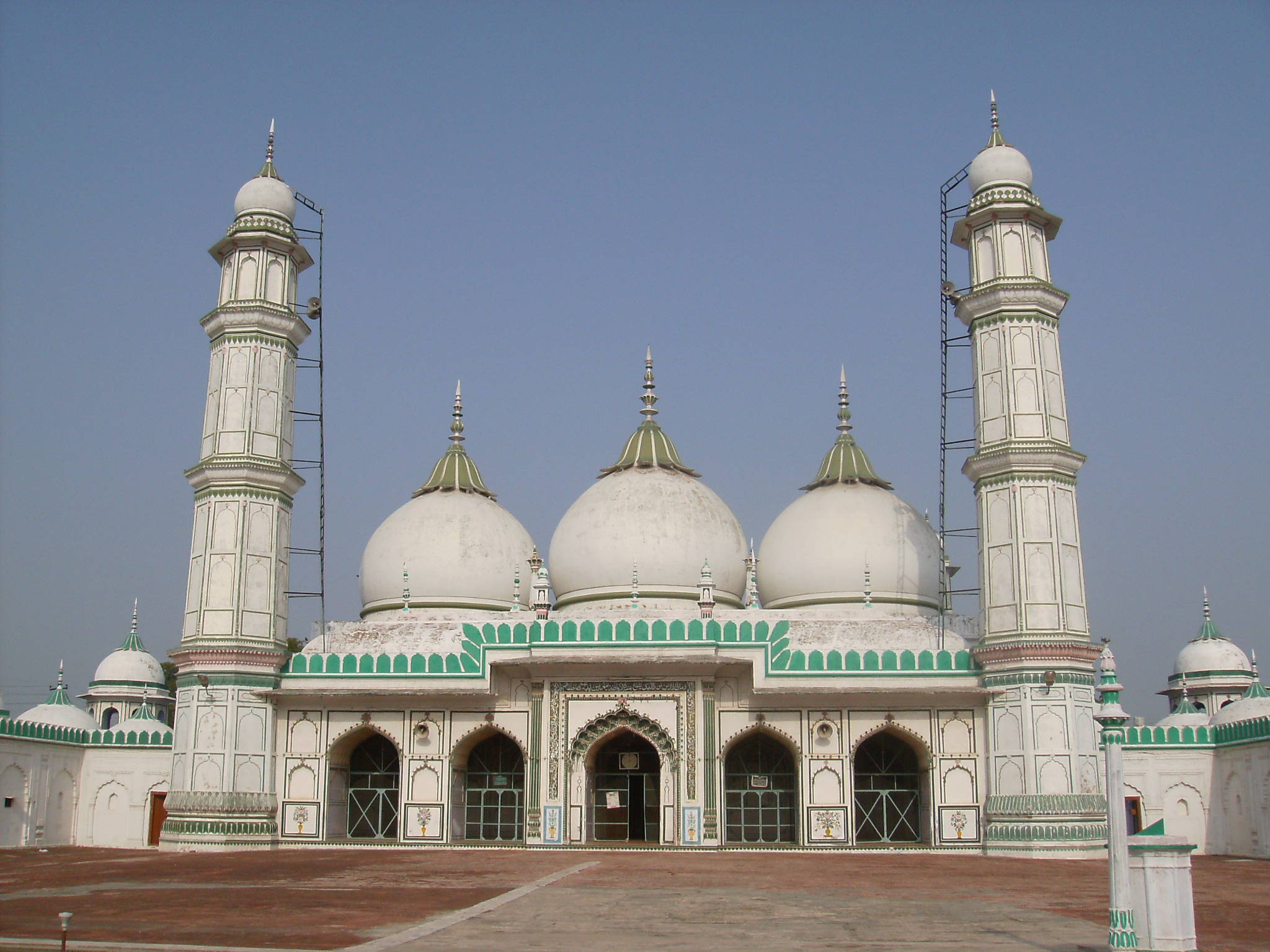
- The mosque in 2009

- Location of the mosque in Uttar Pradesh

Religion
- Affiliation: Sunni Islam
- Ecclesiastical or organizational status: Mosque
- Leadership: Shahi Imam
- Status: Active

Location
- Location: Pilibhit, Bareilly division, Uttar Pradesh
- Country: India
- Interactive map of Jama Masjid
- Coordinates: 28°38′09″N 79°48′03″E

Architecture
- Type: Mosque architecture
- Style: Indo-Islamic
- Founder: Hafiz Rahmat Khan Barech
- Completed: 1769
- Construction cost: ₹3 lakhs

Specifications
- Dome: Three (maybe more)
- Minaret: Two

The Jama Masjid is a Sunni mosque, located in Pilibhit, in the Bareilly division of the state of Uttar Pradesh, India. The mosque was constructed by Hafiz Rahmat Khan Barech in 1769 and was modelled on the Jama Masjid Delhi. The mosque is situated 3.2 kilometres (2.0 mi) from Pilibhit Junction Railway Station and in the Sarai Khan Area, near Ayurvedic College.

== Architecture ==
The gateway is built in Mughal style, which resembles to the gateways of the Jama Masjid in Delhi, while the wall around the mosque enclosure are reminiscences of the curvilinear Bengali roof found in Shahjahan's additions to the Mughal palace at Agra.

== Overview ==
Every Friday, a number of Muslims in the city and nearby villages gather to perform the Friday prayer. The part of the building has been destroyed and part of land has been trespassed. A small market is also held on every Tuesday in the Jama Masjid compound. A new Tehsil compound has also been constructed close to Jama Masjid.

Construction of the mosque cost ₹3 lakhs.

== See also ==
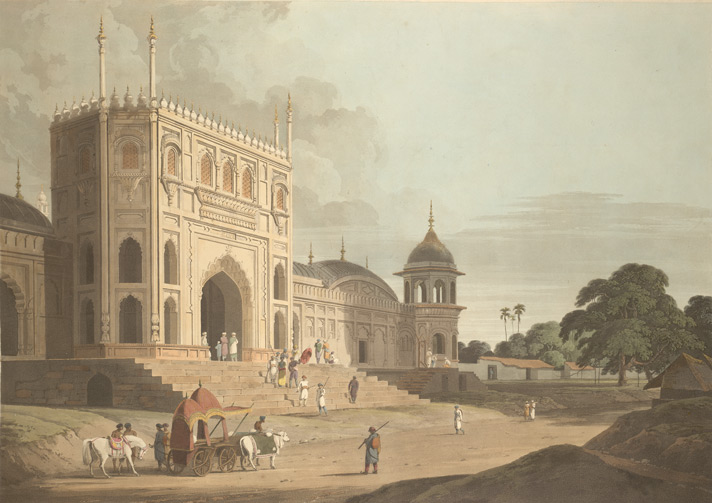
The gate of the Mosque in the 1780s, by Thomas Daniell

- Sunni Islam in India
- List of mosques in India
