= Rozi Khan Barrech =

Pakistani judge (born 1964)

Chief Justice of the Balochistan High Court
- In office 6 June 2025 – 14 November 2025

Justice of the Balochistan High Court
- In office 31 May 2019 – 2025

Personal details
- Born: 7 March 1964 (age 62)
- Education: University Law College, Quetta (LL.B, Masters)

Rozi Khan Barrech (born 7 March 1964) is a Pakistani jurist who has served as a judge of the Federal Constitutional Court of Pakistan since 14 November 2025. He previously was a judge of the Balochistan High Court (BHC) from 31 May 2019 and the BHC Chief Justice from 6 June 2025 until being named to the Federal Constitutional Court.

== Early life and education ==
Barrech was born on 7 March 1964 in Quetta, Balochistan, Pakistan to Mehrban Khan. He completed his secondary education in 1984, followed by intermediate studies in 1986. He earned his undergraduate degree in 1988 and obtained a Bachelor of Laws (LL.B.) from University Law College, Quetta in 1990. He went on to complete a master's degree in 1991.

== Career ==
Barrech began his judicial career in 1998 when he was appointed as an Additional District and Sessions Judge in Balochistan. Over the years, he served in multiple districts across the province in various judicial capacities, including District and Sessions Judge, Special Judge, and District and Sessions Judge (Inspection). On 4 November 2016, he assumed the role of Registrar of the BHC.

He was elevated to the position of Additional Judge of the BHC on 31 May 2019, and his appointment was confirmed on 7 May 2021. Subsequently, on 6 June 2025, he took oath as the Acting Chief Justice of the BHC. On 1 July 2025, the Judicial Commission of Pakistan approved Barrech's appointment as the permanent Chief Justice of the BHC.
