= Chand Bagh School =

School in Punjab, Pakistan

- Logo of Chand Bagh School

Location
- Muridke, Sheikhupura, Punjab; Pakistan; 31°48′08″N 74°09′00″E

Information
- Type: Public school
- Motto: Groomed to Serve
- Established: September 1998
- Sister school: The Doon School
- President: Usman Jilani Khan
- Principal: Muhammad Abdul Naeem Khan
- Staff: 56 (teaching)
- Enrollment: 600
- Area: 190-acre (77 ha)
- Founder: Ghulam Jilani Khan
- Houses: Abaseen, A.J., Ghani, Mehran, Qarshi (Junior House), Saigol, Sanobar, & Z. H.
- Website: Official website

Chand Bagh School is an independent boarding school for boys at Muridke in the Sheikhupura District of Punjab, Pakistan, approximately 40 km north of Lahore.

The school opened in September 1998, having been conceived as a Pakistani version of The Doon School of India. The name "Chand Bagh" refers to the Doon School's estate at Dehradun, India.

== History and name ==
The origins of the school lie in the independence of Pakistan in 1947 and the series of Indo-Pakistani wars and conflicts which have since followed. In 1985 a group of Pakistan's "Ex-Doscos", alumni of the Doon School, who had attended it in the days of British India, travelled to Dehradun in India to attend the school's 50th anniversary celebrations. On their return they formed a Doon School Society of Pakistan (DSSP), which aimed to create a Pakistani version of their old school. Years later the school was founded by Ghulam Jilani Khan, a general and former Governor of the Punjab Province, himself a Dosco, and ten fellow-trustees. In many respects Chand Bagh School as it exists today is modelled on the Doon School at Dehradun.

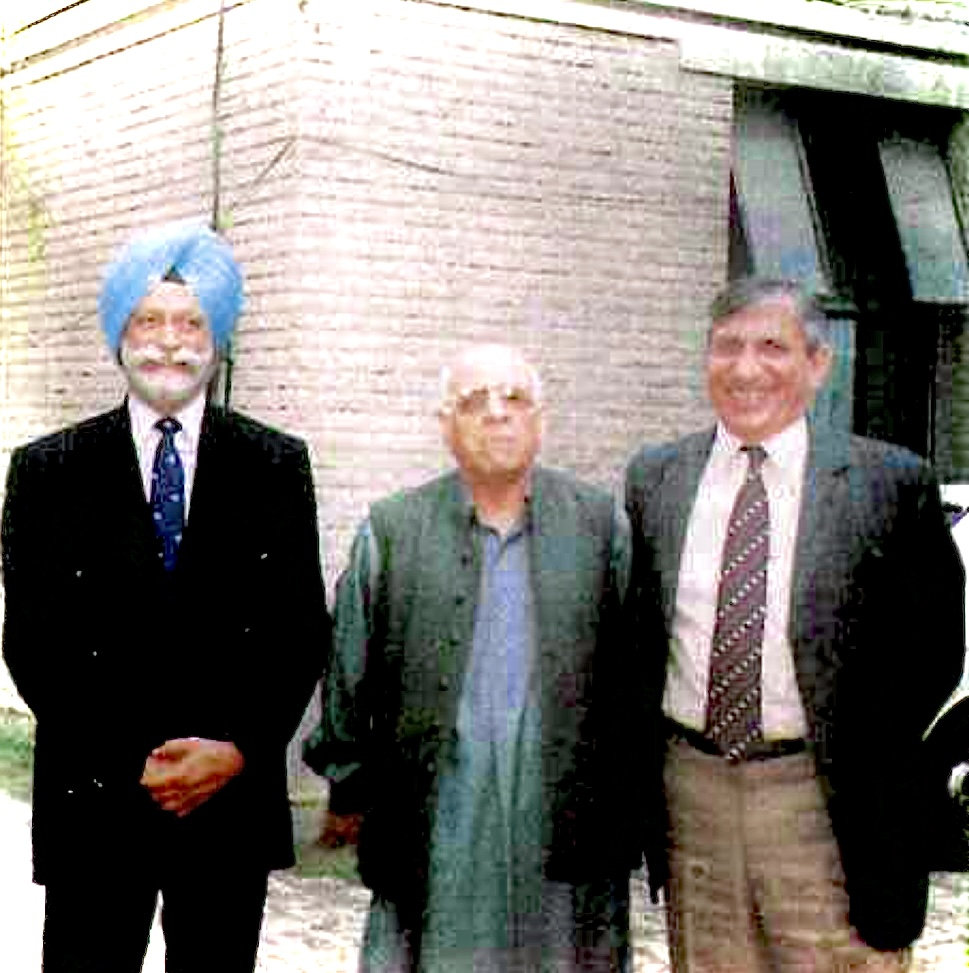
Three of the founders: Mustafa Anwar, Ghulam Jilani Khan, and Pushpindar Singh Chopra

The name "Chand Bagh" means "moon garden" and was chosen in memory of the original Doon School, which had been established in 1935 on the Chand Bagh estate at Dehradun, now in the Indian state of Uttarakhand.

The principal architect of the new buildings, which have Romanesque influences, was Kamil Khan Mumtaz. The school opened its doors in September 1998 and occupies a campus of some 190 acres. Around the campus are the Chand Bagh Farms, a further 270 acres. The roof has 500 kW of solar panels.

== Education at the school ==
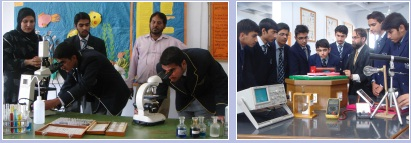
The school laboratories

The school teaches in the English language. Boys are admitted in April into Grades 5,6, 7, 8,9 and 12 and work towards passing O-Levels and A-Levels of the University of Cambridge International Examinations Board. The student–teacher ratio is maintained at 15:1. Entry is selective, based on an admission test. In March 2011 such tests were announced to take place in Karachi, Rahim Yar Khan, Quetta, Muzaffarabad, Gilgit, Sukkur and Peshawar.

In Grades 6, 7 and 8 all boys take English, Urdu, Art, Computing, General Science, Geography, History, Islamiyat, Mathematics, and Physical Education. On entering Grade 12, all pupils need to choose subjects to follow for their final two years of secondary education, taking three or four A-Level courses. The main options are Biology, Chemistry, Physics, Mathematics, Business Studies, Urdu, Computing, Economics, and Accounting, plus the General Papers. The school thus gives its boys a grounding in humanities and natural sciences but focusses on the sciences in Grades 12 and 13.

As of June 2011, each student is charged Rs 30,000 or more per month to attend this school.

In 2011 the school advertised for new staff, stating that it was "looking for young dedicated faculty members as part of its expansion programme", naming twelve subjects, Physics, Chemistry, Biology, Islamiyat, Economics, Accounting, History, Geography, Mathematics, Business Studies, Computer science, and English.

== Extracurricular activities ==
In school sports, Chand Bagh competes against Aitchison College, PAF College Sargodha, Chenab College Jhang and many other renowned institutions of the country at cricket, hockey, football and basketball, and takes part in the Shapes Cricket League. In September 2006 there was a cricket match against the Wynberg Boys' High School of South Africa.

The school hosts the annual All-Pakistan Art Competition, and that of 2011 was the ninth such event, when students from twenty-six institutions stayed at the school and were asked for work on the subject of "Ray of Hope". The judges presented shields and a trophy, and all paintings were later on display in Lahore. The principal of the school, Syed Nusrat Ali Shah Kazmi, opened the exhibition and said the competition was intended to discover potential.

The 10th All Pakistan Music Festival was also held at Chand Bagh School in late January, 2011.

== Official support ==
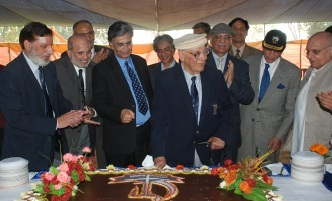
Founder's Day, 2010

In 2010 Muhammad Shahbaz Sharif, Chief Minister of the Punjab, was the main speaker at the school's annual Prize Day. He used the occasion to announce the provision of a grant of Rs 50 million for the school's Endowment Fund and two new buses. He said

Time has come that we find ways for providing education to the poor but talented students in the prestigious educational institutions so that their abilities could be polished and used for the progress and prosperity of the country.

At the ninth Founder's Day, on 26 February 2011, the main speaker was Yousaf Raza Gillani, Prime Minister of Pakistan, who saluted the vision of General Ghulam Jilani Khan "which created opportunities for the deserving students of the less privileged sections to acquire quality education in the school like Chand Bagh". He concluded by announcing the payment of Rs 40 million "as first instalment for endowment fund". This led to criticism in Pakistan Today, which quoted sources as suggesting that "...at a time when thousands of schools in the province were without proper buildings, endowing an elite school was a waste of public funds". The Economist of Pakistan commented that "This elitism has left a big question mark on the Punjab government's sincerity to provide education to all."

When the Punjab Assembly approved its budget for the year 2011–2012, Chief Minister Sharif commented on the grants of Rs 50 million for the school. In response to objections from the Opposition, he said Chand Bagh plays "an important role in the promotion of education in the country and right of no one had been violated by giving donation to the school," and that the school was "not only for rich families" as it also offered places for "children of extremely poor families, destitute and orphans."

For the tenth Founder's Day, on 26 February 2012, the chief guest speaker was announced as Chaudhry Abdul Majid, prime minister of Azad Jammu and Kashmir. on the twelfth Founders day, February 2014 the chief guest was Mohammad Sarwar Governor of Punjab, Pakistan

== Principals ==
- 1998–2001: Andrew Maclehose, previously of Geelong Grammar School and the International School of Geneva
- 2001–2002: Bernard C. Biggs, previously a housemaster at Rugby School and headmaster of St George's School, Windsor, and Karachi Grammar School
- 2002–2007: Saleem Arshad Kashmiri, formerly headmaster of Aitchison College
- 2007–2010: Muhammad Asif Malik, formerly head of Sadiq Public School
- 2010–2012: Colonel (Retd) Syed Nusrat Ali Shah Kazmi SI, formerly head of Chinar Army Public School and College
- 2013–2017: Muhammad Tariq Qureshi Air Commodore (Retd) Tamgha-e-Basalat formerly head of PAF Public School Lower Topa
- 2018–2024: Ch. Muhammad Afzal.
- 2024– Present: Muhammad Abdul Naeem Khan Sqn. Ldr.(Retd)

== Associated school ==
The separate "Chand Bagh Day School Campus" formerly known as Chand Tara School, opened in 1999, caters for girls of all ages up to the Higher Secondary Education Certificate and also for boys up to Grade 5.

== Gallery ==
Chand Bagh School

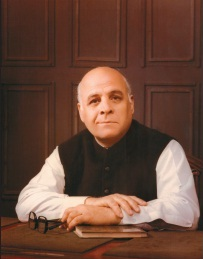
Ghulam Jilani Khan, Founder

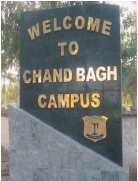
Welcome

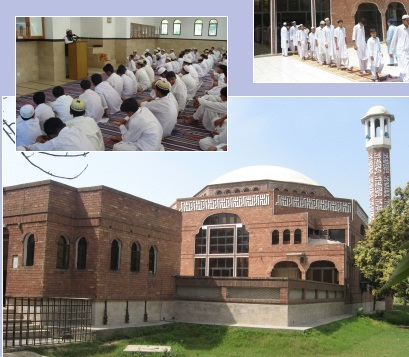
The mosque

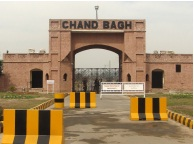
Main entrance

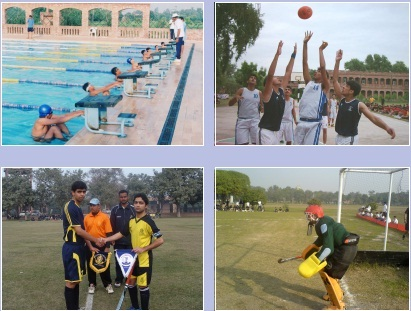
Some sports

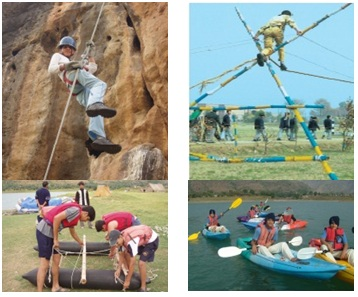
Adventure training

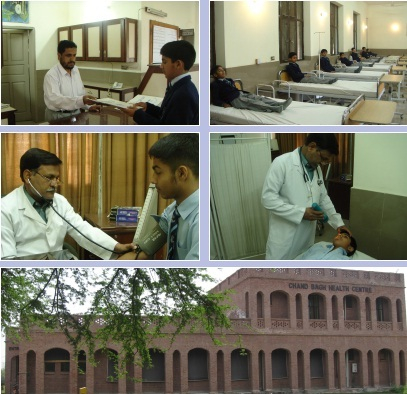
Health centre

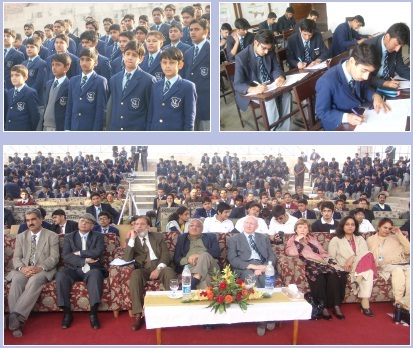
Summer workshop

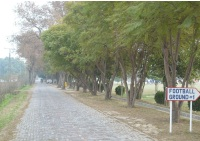
Near sports fields

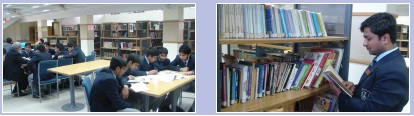
School library
