= Waris Shah =

Punjabi Sufi Poet (1722–1798)

- وارث شاہ
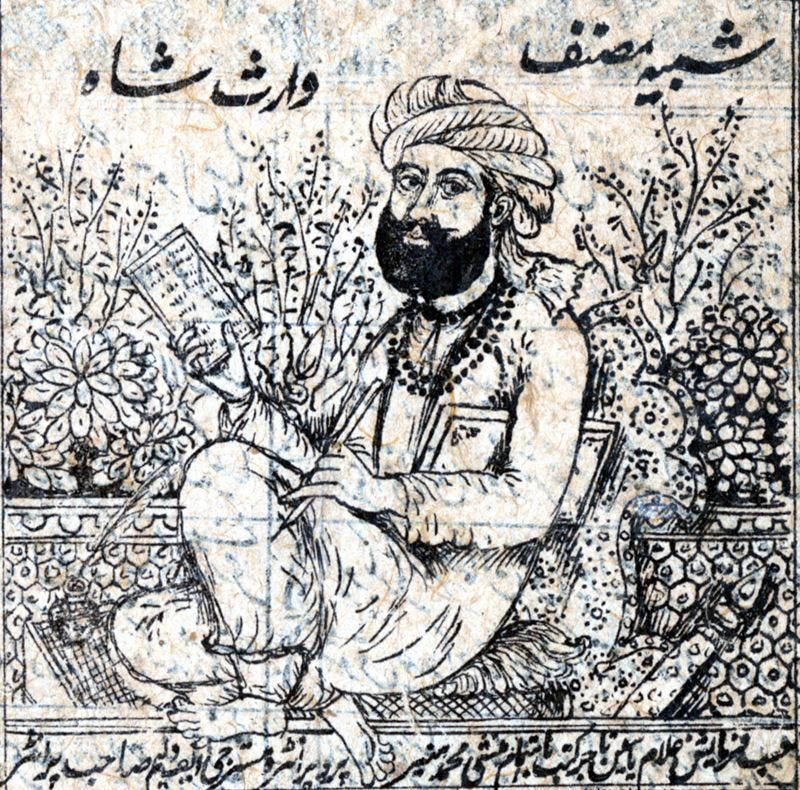
- Depiction of Waris Shah, Lahore, ca.1859
- Born: 1722; Jandiala Sher Khan, Sheikhupura, Punjab, Mughal Empire (present-day, Punjab, Pakistan)
- Died: 1799 (aged 76–77); Jandiala Sher Khan, Sheikhupura, Sikh Empire (present-day, Punjab, Pakistan)
- Occupation: Poet
- Writing career
- Genre: Sufi poetry
- Notable work: Heer Ranjha

Waris Shah (Punjabi: وارث شاہ (Shahmukhi); 1722 – 1798) was an 18th-century Punjabi Muslim Sufi poet of the Chishti order, known for his contribution to Punjabi literature.

He is primarily known as the author of the best known rendition of Heer Ranjha (1766), one of the most popular tragic romances of Punjab. Traditionally, it is recited in bhairavi raga and this continues to be done so even today.

== Background ==
Portrait painting of Waris Shah

Syed Mohammad Waris Shah was born in Jandiala Sher Khan, Punjab (present-day Punjab, Pakistan) into a reputed Sayyid family, and was a descendant of Sayyid Muhammad al-Makki through his son Sayyid Badruddin. His father was Gulsher Shah and mother was Kamal Banu. His parents are said to have died when he was young. Waris spent years in search of the perfect spiritual guide. Waris Shah acknowledged himself to be a disciple of an ustad from Kasur, namely Hafiz Ghulam Murtaza from whom he received his education. After completing his education, Waris moved to Malka Hans, a town, twelve kilometres north of Pakpattan. Here he resided in a small room (or Hujra), adjacent to a historic mosque now called Masjid Waris Shah, until his death.

Waris Shah was also an eyewitness to the first Invasion of India by the Afghan leader Ahmad Shah Abdali. He witnessed the Battle of Lahore between the Afghan forces and the Mughal forces under Shah Nawaz which resulted in Lahore coming under Afghan control during January 1748. Waris Shah condemned Shah Nawaz's actions during the battle and even referred to him as a coward. Other poets later added their own verses in Qissa Waris Shah throughout the history. It is estimated that there are 11069 forged verses in the commonly available Qissa Waris Shah. One of the oldest and most accurate copy of Qissa Waris Shah (published by Kripa Ram) in 1916 is available in the Punjab Public Library in Lahore.

== Works ==
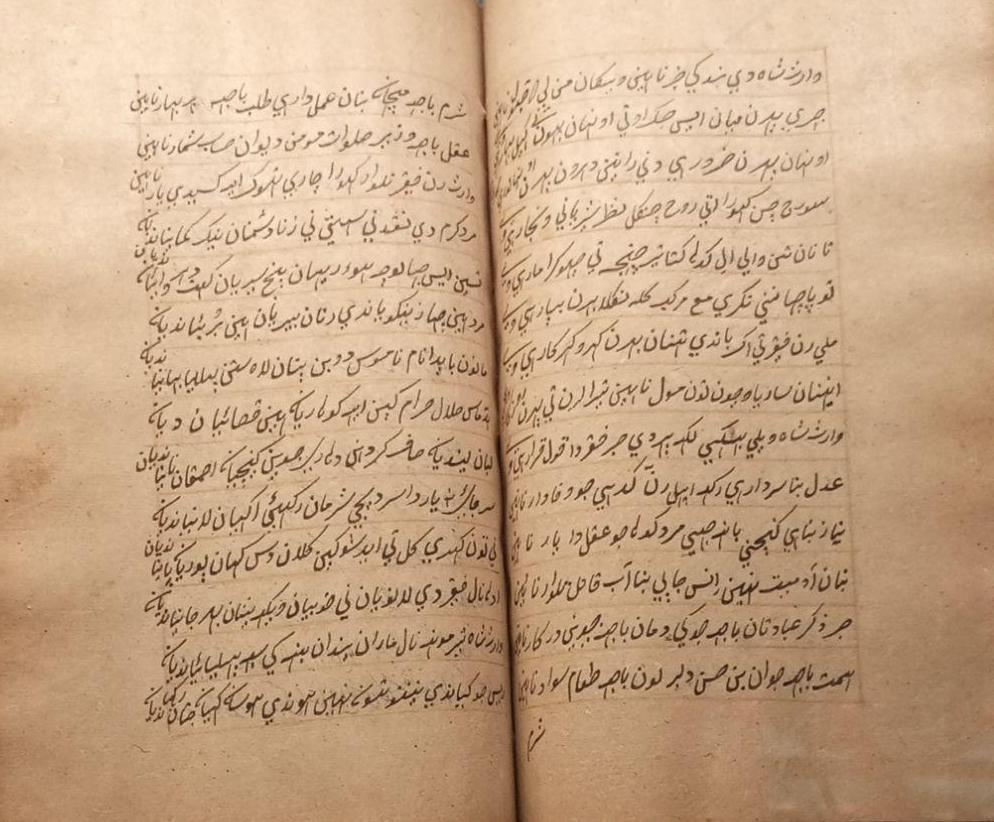
Folios of a manuscript of Heer Waris Shah (Waris Shah's version of the Heer-Ranjha folktale), circa 19th century

=== Examples ===
Many verses of Waris Shah are widely used in Punjab in a moral context, for instance:

- Na adataan jaandiyan ne, Bhavein katiye poriyan poriyan ji

نہ عادتاں جاندیاں نیں، بھاویں کٹیے پوریاں پوریاں جی
(A man never abandons his habits, even if he is hacked to pieces)

- Waris rann, faqir, talwar, ghora; Chare thok eh kisse de yar nahin

وارثؔ رن، فقیر، تلوار، گھوڑا، چارے تھوک ایہ کسے دے یار ناہیں
(Waris says that woman, beggar, sword and horse, these four are never anyone's friends)

- Waris Shah faqir di aqal kithe; eh pattian ishq parhaiyan ne

وارثؔ شاہ فقیر دی عقل کتھے، ایہ پٹیاں عشق پڑھائیاں نیں
(It is beyond the wisdom of faqeer Waris Shah (to write this verse), (But) these lessons are taught by Love)

- Eh rooh qalboot da zikr sara nal aqal de mel malaya ee

ایہ روح قلبوت دا ذکر سارا نال عقل دے میل ملایا ای
(This entire reference is about Soul meeting with the Divine, Beloved which has been contrived with great wisdom)

== Tomb ==
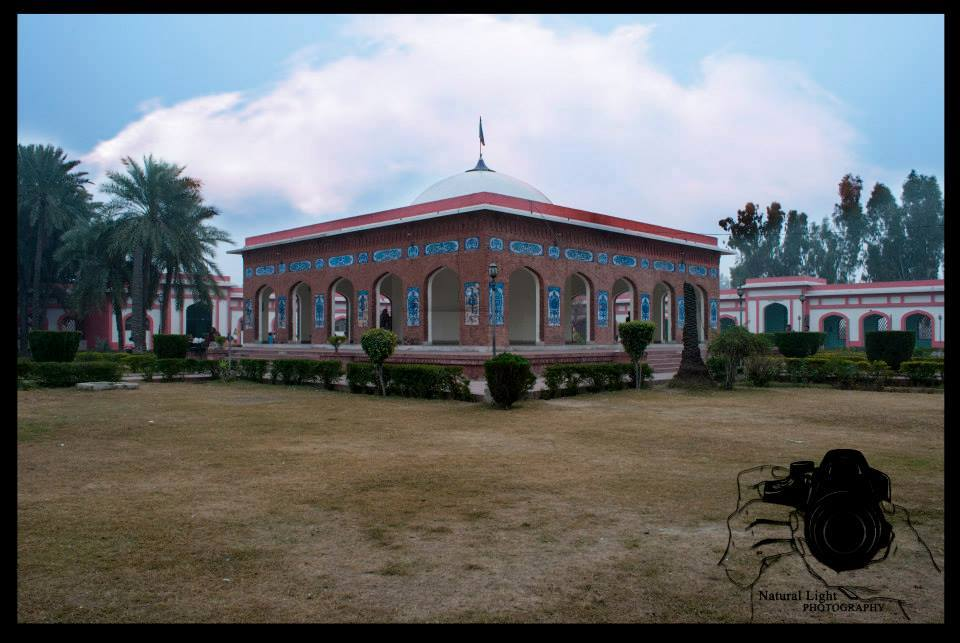
Tomb of Syed Waris Shah at Jandiala Sher Khan

The tomb or mausoleum of Waris Shah is in Jandiala Sher Khan town near Sheikhupura in Punjab, Pakistan. His urs (death anniversary) is held and celebrated there every year.

== Legacy ==
The renowned Punjabi writer and poet Amrita Pritam is best remembered for her famous work Ajj Aakhaan Waris Shah Nu (lit. "Today I Invoke Waris Shah") about the horrors of the partition of Punjab:

- Ajj aakhaan Waris Shah nu, kito qabran vichon bol

اج آکھاں وارث شاہ نوں، کِتوں قبراں وچوں بول
(Today, I call upon Waris Shah, to rise from the grave and speak)

- Te ajj kitaab e ishq da koi agla warka phol

تے اج کتابِ عشق دا کوئی اگلا ورقہ پھول
(And plead with him to open another page in the book of love)

== In media ==
Waris Shah's life has been fictionalised in Punjabi-language films. A 1964 Pakistani film titled Waris Shah featured Inayat Hussain Bhatti in the title role. Another film on the life of Shah, Sayyed Waris Shah, was released in India in 1980; followed by Waris Shah: Ishq Daa Waaris in 2006 which had Gurdas Maan in the role of Waris Shah.

== See also ==
- List of Punjabi language poets
