= Ghulam Jilani Khan =

Pakistani general (1925–1999)

Lieutenant General Ghulam Jilani Khan غلام جيلانى خان HI(M) SBt

21st Governor of Punjab
- In office 1 May 1980 – 30 December 1985
- President: Muhammad Zia-ul-Haq
- Preceded by: Sawar Khan
- Succeeded by: Sajjad Hussain Qureshi

Defence Secretary of Pakistan
- In office 6 October 1977 – 4 April 1980
- President: General Zia-ul-Haq
- Preceded by: Ghulam Ishaq Khan
- Succeeded by: Muhammad Riaz

5th Director General of the ISI
- In office 16 December 1971 – 16 September 1978
- Preceded by: Akbar Khan
- Succeeded by: Muhammad Riaz

Personal details
- Born: Ghulam Jilani Khan; 1924 Gujranwala, Punjab, British India
- Died: 1999 (aged 74–75) Lahore, Punjab, Pakistan
- Relations: Zia Ullah Khan
- Children: Shaukat Jilani Khan; Usman Jilani Khan; Saulat Jilani Khan; Omer Jilani Khan; Sadia Jilani Khan
- Education: The Doon School; Indian Military Academy
- Occupation: Soldier and military administrator
- Cabinet: Zia regime
- Awards: Hilal-i-Imtiaz Sitara-i-Basalat

Military service
- Allegiance: (British Raj) British India (1944–1947); Pakistan (1947–1985)
- Branch/service: (British Raj) British Indian Army; Pakistan Army
- Years of service: 1944–1985
- Rank: Lieutenant-General
- Unit: 8 FF Regiment; Military Intelligence Corps
- Commands: Military Intelligence (MI); Inter-Services Intelligence (ISI)
- Battles/wars: Second World War; Indo-Pakistani War of 1965; Indo-Pakistani War of 1971
- Other work: Founder Chand Bagh School

Ghulam Jilani Khan HI(M) SBt (Punjabi, Urdu: غلام جيلانى خان (1924–1999) was a general of the Pakistan Army who served as the 14th Governor of Punjab Province and the 11th Defence Secretary of Pakistan in the military government of President General Zia-ul-Haq.

Commissioned in 1944, Jilani was a junior officer in the Indian Army and served with distinction in the Second World War, then with the partition of 1947 opted for Pakistan and took a leave of absence to join the fighting in Kashmir as an irregular. He returned to the regular army and joined the Military Intelligence Directorate. He later commanded field operations in the 1965 and 1971 wars against India. In 1971 he assumed the directorship of the Directorate-General for Inter-Services Intelligence (ISI). After six years there, he assisted General Zia in the operation code-named Fair Play to remove Prime Minister Zulfikar Ali Bhutto, subsequently joining Zia's military administration as Secretary General at the Ministry of Defence. In 1980, he was appointed martial law administrator and Governor of the Punjab Province, which he governed until 1985. He is also known as the mentor of Nawaz Sharif, whom he made Chief Minister of Punjab.

In retirement, Jilani was the principal founder of Chand Bagh School.

== Early life and military career ==
Educated at the Doon School, Dehradun, and the Indian Military Academy, Jilani was commissioned into the Indian Army in 1944 in the 129th DCO Baluchis of the 10th Baluch Regiment as an infantry officer. Between 1944 and 1945 he served in Burma as a second lieutenant, second-in-command of the Mortar Platoon of the Support Company Between 1945 and 1947 as a lieutenant and platoon leader, he commanded a rifle platoon of the Pathan Rifle Company of the 129th Baluchis. The troops in his unit were from the Mahsud and Awan tribes.

In 1947, with the independence, his unit was transferred to the new Pakistan Army. Between 1947 and 1948 he was granted a leave of absence to become a guerrilla fighter in Kashmir. He was not only a fierce opponent of India but also a supporter of the United States. During the 1950s, as a captain, he was a 2 i/c of the Support Company and also rifle company commander in the Baloch Regiment as well as a battalion adjutant as a major, and for a time his battalion was posted in East Pakistan. He was promoted to major in 1952 and to lieutenant colonel in 1957. He attended the Senior Staff Course (for Division level staff officers) at the Staff College Quetta in 1954–55. After serving briefly as brigade major and as aide-de-camp to Iskandar Ali Mirza in 1955-56 and as an instructor and adjutant at the Pakistan Military Academy between 1956 and 1958, he was the commanding officer of the 11th Battalion of the Baloch Regiment between 1958 and 1960 and CO of the 12th Battalion between 1960 and 1961. In his capacity as battalion commander, he was for a time also the martial law administrator of Pakpattan District. In 1961 he was selected for a Military Intelligence appointment under the Directorate-General of Military Intelligence. He was promoted to colonel in 1963, and in 1965 he was the Military Intelligence Field Officer attached with the 6th Armoured Division at Chawinda. He was promoted to the rank of brigadier in 1967 and was for most of the time after that a departmental director in the Directorate for Inter-Services Intelligence, except for a short stint as commandant of the Baluch Regimental Centre & Recruit Depot (BRC&RD) at Abbottabad in 1969–70.

During 1971 he was with the Pakistani forces fighting Bangladeshi independence which suffered painful defeats at the hands of the Indian Army. With the rank of brigadier he was chief of staff to the commander-in-chief of Eastern Command until the middle of 1971, when he was promoted Major-General and posted to Pakistan's principal intelligence agency, the Directorate for Inter-Services Intelligence, or ISI, as director general.

From 1971 to 1978 Jilani headed the ISI, being the third man to hold the position. In that role, he served three Pakistani governments, those headed successively by Yahya Khan, Z. A. Bhutto, and Zia-ul-Haq. In 1976, when Tikka Khan retired as Chief of Army Staff, Jilani was the fifth most senior army officer. Tikka Khan considered those in the first, second and fourth positions unsuitable to replace him, so recommended the third most senior officer, Akbar Khan, to Prime Minister and Defence Minister Zulfiqar Ali Bhutto. In the event, Bhutto ignored this recommendation and chose instead General Zia-ul-Haq, seventh in the list of seniority. Jilani, who lacked the experience of combat formation command above higher than an infantry battalion, was thus passed over, but in fact he had lobbied Bhutto to appoint Zia, and Bhutto later wrote that he had been influenced in the matter by General Jilani Khan.

In April 1976, and again in October, Jilani sent reports to Bhutto which recommended the holding of fresh elections sooner rather than later, and Bhutto agreed with this advice. The 1977 general election had been expected in the second half of the year, but on 7 January Bhutto announced that the election would be held on 7 March. When he was later awaiting execution, Bhutto hinted that he might have been trapped in a conspiracy.

== Public life ==
In October 1977, a few months after Zia-ul-Haq's "Operation Fair Play" coup d'état had removed Bhutto and his government from office, with Zia himself becoming Chief Martial Law Administrator, Jilani joined Zia's government as Secretary General at the Ministry of Defence. In February 1979, he led a Military Goodwill Delegation to the People's Republic of China, where he had discussions with Chairman Hua Guofeng and Vice Premier Li Xiannian. Jilani remained at the Ministry of Defence until 1 May 1980, when he was appointed to succeed General Sawar Khan as Governor of the Punjab Province, a powerful post which he retained until the end of the Military administration in December 1985.

Unlike Zia-ul-Haq, Jilani was not particularly pietistic in his private life. In political life, he became well known for his conviction that most of Pakistan's political troubles were due to feudal influences, which he was anxious to weaken. He was suspicious of most politicians from rural areas, so he attempted to encourage and promote new urban leaders. Among these was Nawaz Sharif, an industrialist to whom Jilani gave his first political appointment, as Finance Minister in the Punjab provincial government. In 1985 he nominated Sharif as Chief Minister of the Punjab, and Sharif went on to become Prime Minister of Pakistan.

When the Chinese premier Zhao Ziyang visited Pakistan for talks in June 1981 it was Jillani who greeted him at Lahore airport. On 31 July 1981 an express train from Karachi to Peshawar crashed near Bahawalpur with more than thirty dead, and Jilani announced the same day that he suspected sabotage. In 1983 Jilani issued a directive which created the Marghzar College for Women of the University of Gujrat. In January 1984, as Governor of the Punjab, Jilani was concerned by intelligence that refugees from Afghanistan were buying land in Pakistan and gave instructions to his district administrators to prevent such sales. On 30 December 1985 he stood down as Governor of the Punjab, to be succeeded by Makhdoom Muhammad Sajjad Hussain Qureshi.

== Retirement ==
In retirement, Jilani took up the cause of the proposed new independent Chand Bagh School, to be a Pakistani boarding school inspired by his own alma mater, the Doon School. After several years of effort, he succeeded in founding the new school, which opened at Muridke in September 1998.

Jillani occasionally wrote on military subjects, and on 5 June 1999, not long before his death, the newspaper Pakistan published an article under his name which analysed the conflict in Kashmir in terms of the region's strategic roads.

== Legacy ==
Ghulam Jilani Khan is honoured every year at the Chand Bagh School's Founder's Day celebrations. At the ninth such occasion, on 26 February 2011, the main speaker was Yousaf Raza Gillani, Prime Minister of Pakistan, who said

I salute the vision of the School's founder late General Ghulam Jilani Khan, which created opportunities for the deserving students of the less privileged sections to acquire quality education in the school like Chand Bagh.

Jilani's son Lt. Col. (Retd.) Dr. Usman Jilani Khan is now the president of the Chand Bagh Foundation.

== Awards and decorations ==

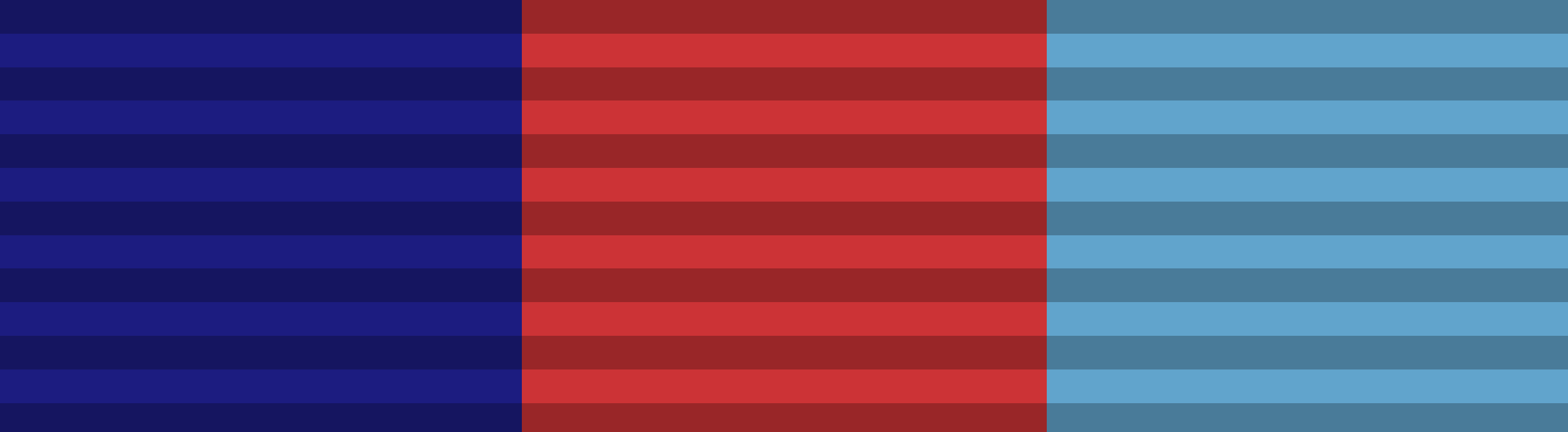

Hilal-e-Imtiaz (Military) (Crescent of Excellence)		Sitara-e-Basalat (Star of Good Conduct)	
Tamgha-e-Diffa (General Service Medal) Kashmir 1964/65 War Clasp	Sitara-e-Harb 1971 War (War Star 1971)	Tamgha-e-Jang 1965 War (War Medal 1965)	Tamgha-e-Jang 1971 War (War Medal 1971)
Pakistan Tamgha (Pakistan Medal) 1947	Tamgha-e-Sad Saala Jashan-e- Wiladat-e-Quaid-e-Azam (100th Birth Anniversary of Muhammad Ali Jinnah) 1976	Tamgha-e-Jamhuria (Republic Commemoration Medal) 1956	Hijri Tamgha (Hijri Medal) 1979
1939-1945 Star	Burma Star	War Medal; 1939-1945	General Service Medal World War 2 (Awarded in 1945)

=== British India decorations ===
Imperial Awards
British India	1939–1945 Star
British India	Burma Star
British India	War Medal 1939–1945
UK	Queen Elizabeth II Coronation Medal

== Books ==
- Iqbāl ke ʻaskarī afkār (اقبال کے عسکرى افکار), on military ideas in the poetry of Muhammad Iqbal, 1877–1938, national poet of Pakistan; with biographical sketches of notable Muslim generals
- Pāk fauj men̲ nafāz̲-i Urdū, on the implementation of the Urdu language in the Pakistan army
- Infanṭarī: malikah-yi jang: ek irtiqāʼī jāʼizah (انفنٹرى : ملكه جنگ : ايک ارتقائ جائزه). Historical study of various infantry forces from World War I to date; with reference to the infantry of the Pakistan Army
- Es. Es. Jī: tārīk̲h̲ ke āʼīne men̲, a historical study of the Special Service Group (SSG) of the Pakistan Army

Political offices
Preceded by Sawar Khan	Governor of Punjab; 1 May 1980 – 30 Dec 1985	Succeeded by Sajjad Hussain Qureshi
