= Shorabak District =

Shorabak District شورابک ولسوالۍ
- District
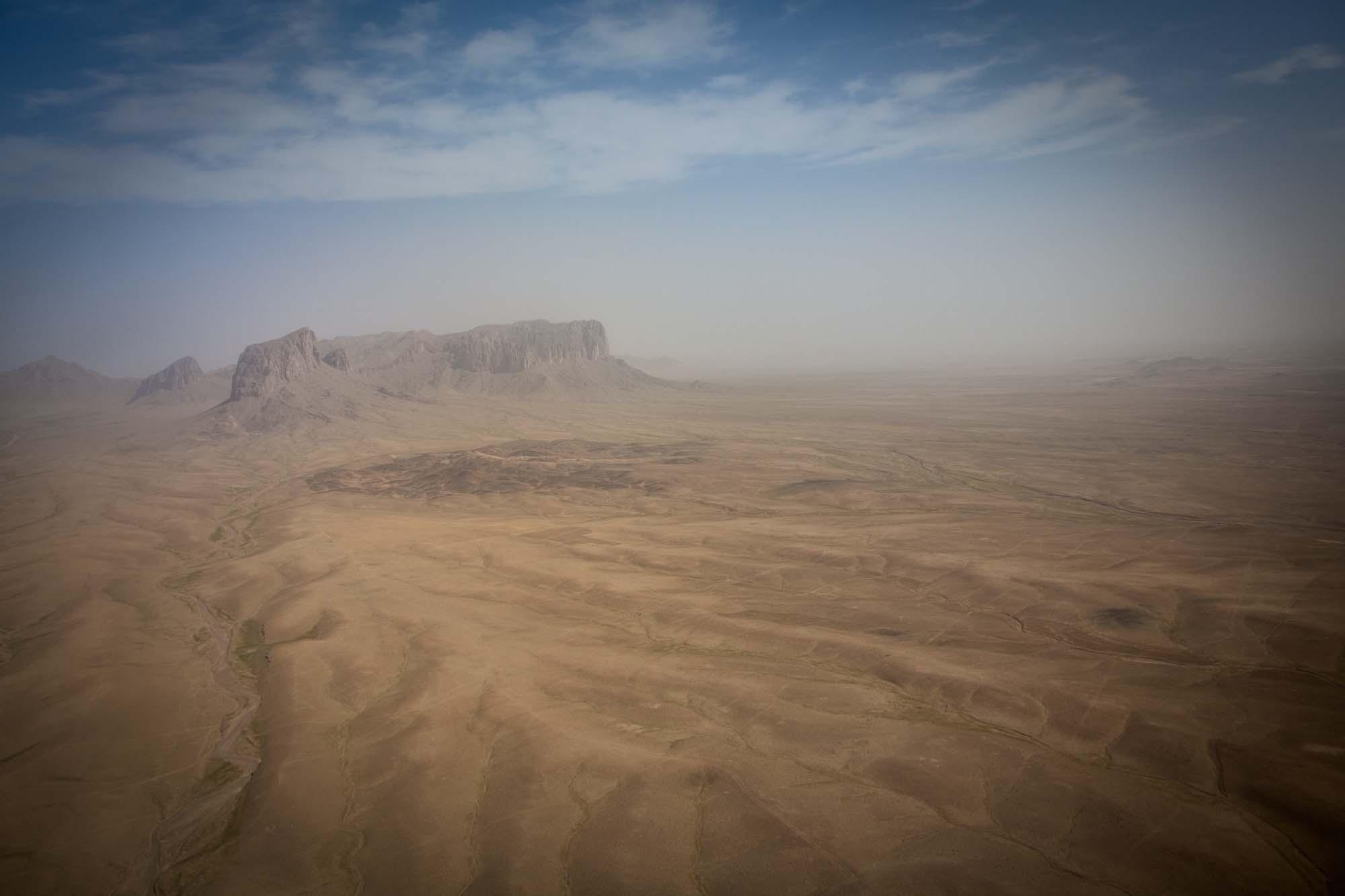
- A mountain range photographed during a visit to Shorabok District in March 2015

- Location within Afghanistan
- Coordinates: 30°11′00″N 66°06′00″E
- Country: Afghanistan
- Province: Kandahar

Area
  - Total: 4.15 km^{2} (1.60 sq mi)
- Elevation: 1,243 m (4,078 ft)

Population (2020)
  - Total: 13,020
  - Density: 3,140/km^{2} (8,130/sq mi)
- Time zone: UTC+4:30 (AFT)
- Postal code: 3852

Shorabak District (Pashto: د شورابک ولسوالۍ) (also Shorawak) is a remote district situated in the southeastern part of Kandahar Province, Afghanistan, 110 km south and east of Kandahar. It borders Reg District to the west, Spin Boldak District to the north and Pakistan to the east and south. The population is 13,020 as of 2020. The district center Shorabak is located at 985 m altitude in the Eastern part of the district.

The district is currently controlled by the Taliban, who took over the district on February 21, 2017.

== Geography ==
Shorabak District is situated on the Afghan-Pakistani border, west of the Sulaiman Mountain Range. It has an average elevation of 1,243 meters above the sea level.
