= Hafiz Rahmat Khan Barech =

Regent of Rohilkhand from 1749 to 1774

Hafiz Rahmat Khan Barech Military-Chief of the Mughal Empire

Mughal Regent of Rohilkhand
- Regentship: 1749 – 1774
- Native name: حافظ رحمت خان
- Born: 1723; Kabul Subah (present-day Mardan District, Khyber Pakhtunkhwa)
- Died: April 1774 (aged 50–51); Miranpur, Kingdom of Rohilkhand
- Buried: Bareilly, Rohilkhand
- Military career
- Allegiance: Mughal Empire
- Branch: Regents of Rohilkhand
- Rank: Wali; Faujdar; Ispahsalar
- Conflicts: Mughal-Maratha Wars; Third Battle of Panipat; First Rohilla War; Battle of Miranpur Katra †

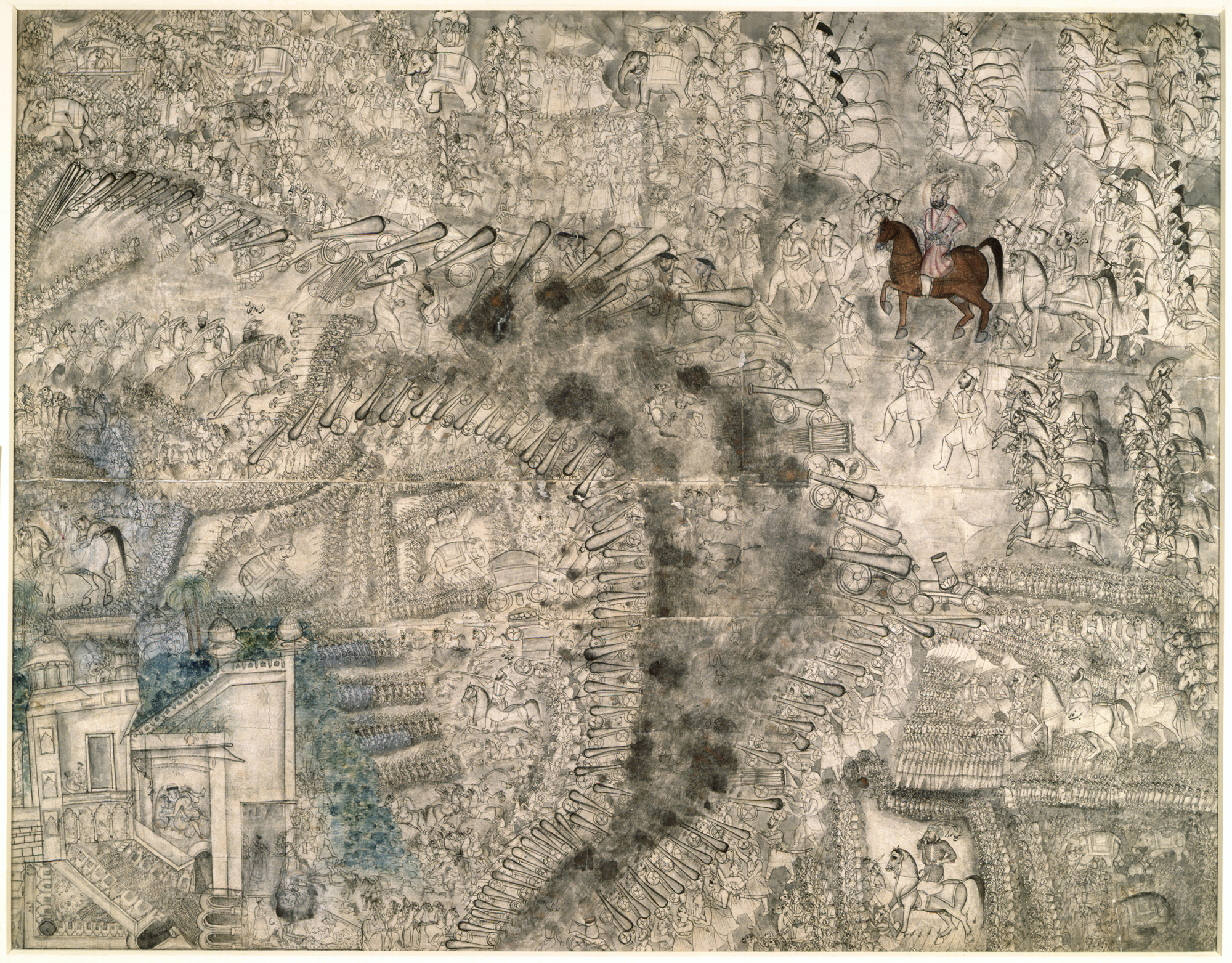
The Third Battle of Panipat, 13 January 1761, Hafiz Rahmat Khan Barech appears left of Ahmad Shah Durrani, who is seated on a brown horse

Hafiz Rahmat Khan Barech (1723 – April 1774) was the regent of the Kingdom of Rohilkhand from 1749 to 1774. He was a Pashtun by origin, ruling on behalf of the sons of Ali Mohammed Khan. Hafiz Rahmat Khan served throughout the reigns of three Mughal Emperors: Ahmad Shah Bahadur, Alamgir II and Shah Alam II. He was also a mentor of Prince Mirza Jawan Bakht.

== Early life and origins ==
In 1673 two Pashtun brothers of the Barech Durrani tribe, Shah Alam Khan and Husain Khan who ancestrally hailed from the Shorawak district of Kandahār, came from the frontier to settle in the Katehr region. Hafiz Rehmat Khan Barech was the son of Shah Alam Khan.

== Victory against Ahmad Shah Durrani (1748) ==
In the year 1748, Ahmad Shah Durrani led an expedition to plunder the western regions of the Mughal Empire. This incursion posed as a major challenge to the Mughal Emperor Muhammad Shah, who urgently Asaf Jah I from the Deccan in order to lead the Mughal Army based in the North-West South Asia, this army was also headed by Prince Ahmad Shah and according to the advice of Ali Mohammed Khan, Hafiz Rahmat Khan was appointed as the Subedar of Sirhind in order to lead and regain and recover territories from the Durrani, forces even Muradyab Khan Kalhoro the Subedar of Sindh to dispatch reinforcements to assist the Mughal Army along the river banks.

Prince Ahmad and the respected Grand Vizier Asaf Jah I were dispatched by the Mughal Emperor Muhammad Shah to command a large Mughal Army of 75,000 to confront the advancing Durrani's. At Sirhind both forces fought a decisive battle and Prince Ahmad was nominally victorious. He was thereupon conferred with the title Bahadur, by the Mughal Emperor.

== Mughal Civil War ==
According to a Firman by Ahmad Shah Bahadur Hafiz Rahmat Khan was assigned to support Feroze Jung III against the Mughal Grand Vizier Safdarjung, who was defeated and forgiven and thus withdrew to become just the Nawab of Awadh and died in 1753.

When Ahmad Shah Bahadur tried to have young Feroze Jung III removed from the imperial court, the outcast then sought an alliance with the detested Maratha chieftain Sadashivrao Bhau. Together they deposed Ahmad Shah Bahadur after the devastating First Battle of Sikandarabad in the year 1754.

Since then Hafiz Rahmat Khan entered the service of Najib-ul-Daula and constantly fought the Marathas led by Sadashivrao Bhau and opposed Feroze Jung III.

== Alliance with the Ahmad Shah Durrani ==
In 1757, the Mughal Emperor Alamgir II with courtiers such as Najib-ul-Daula and Hafiz Rahmat Khan, nobles such as Shah Waliullah and the imperial family went to Sirhind to meet Ahmad Shah Durrani, whose forces then engaged the Marathas in combat and threatened to overthrow and execute the regime of Imad-ul-Mulk. Ahmad Shah Durrani's relations with the Mughal Emperor, strengthened further when his son Timur Shah Durrani married the daughter of Alamgir II and patronized the Mughal commander Jahan Khan.

== Third Battle of Panipat ==
He played an important part in Indian warfare over several decades, being on the winning side of Afghans at the Third Battle of Panipat of 1761, but was defeated and killed in the Rohilla War.

== Counterattacks against Suraj Mal ==
In the year 1764, Najib-ud-Daula the administrator of Delhi and the Mughal heartlands faced relentless warfare against the Jats, led by Suraj Mal, who sacked the Mughal garrison at Agra. They looted the silver doors of the Taj Mahal as a war trophy.

== Internal conflict with Awadh ==
After the war Nawab Shuja-ud-Daula demanded payment for their help from the Rohilla chief, Hafiz Rahmat Khan Barech. When the demand was refused the Nawab joined with the British under Governor Warren Hastings and his Commander-in-Chief, Alexander Champion, to invade Rohilkhand and Hafiz Rahmat Khan Barech was killed in the ensuing Battle of Miranpur Katra in 1774. The whole of Rohilkhand (including Bareilly, Pilibhit and Shahjanpur) was surrendered to the East India Company by the treaty of 10 November 1801. Later, Bareilly was a centre of rebellion for the entire area in the Indian Mutiny of 1857.

He founded the town of Pilibhit, where he also built a Jama Masjid, a replica of the Jama Masjid, Delhi

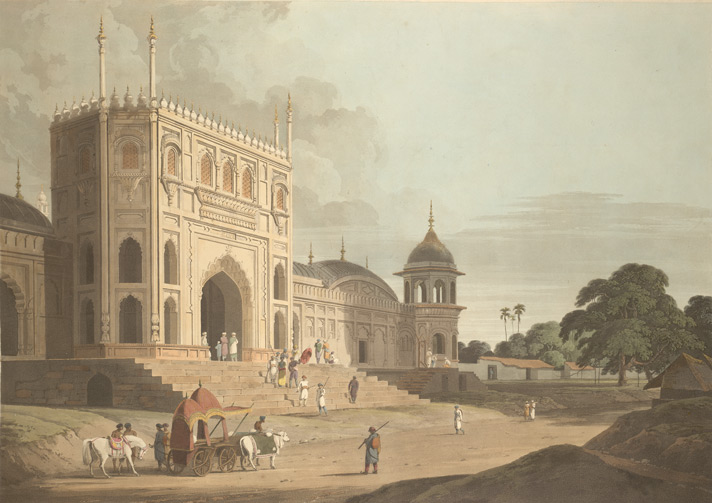
Jamia Mosque in the 1780s

== Descendants ==
Hafiz Rehmat Khan's son, Muhabbat Khan Khan, wrote the Riaz-ul-Mahabbat for the Pashto language. He was however a native of India, and many peculiarities regarding the verbs and tenses, of which he must have been ignorant, have been omitted.

- Khan Bahadur Khan Rohilla (grandson), declared Independence during the Indian War of Independence at Bareilly
