= Jandiala Sher Khan =

Town in Punjab, Pakistan

Coordinates: 31°49′N 73°55′E

جنڈیالہ شیر خاں
- Town
- Jandiala Sher khan Town
- Interactive map of جنڈیالہ شیر خاں
- Country: Pakistan
- Region: Punjab
- District: Shaikhupura District
- Time zone: UTC+5 (PST)

Jandiala Sher Khan, or Jandy ala Sher Khan (Urdu: جنڈیالہ شیر خاں), is a town of Sheikhupura District in Punjab, Pakistan. It is part of Sheikhupura Tehsil and is located at 31°49'15N 73°55'10E. The town is notable for being the birthplace of famous poet Waris Shah, known as the Punjabi Shakespeare, and contains his mausoleum.

Jandiala Sher Khan was an important provincial town in the Mughal Empire. The town was located on a floodplain and there were no nearby sources of water, requiring local residents to dig wells to irrigate their crops. During the reign of Emperor Akbar, a family of means known as Khokhars settled here. Heeding the advice of a local dervish named Syed Ghaznavi, Sher Khan Khokhar built a monumental step-well (known as a baoli) to provide easier access to the water table. Sher Khan Khokhar also built a caravansary-like structure over the stairs to the well, either serving as a type of inn or providing space for merchants to sell goods to travelers along the road between Lahore and Kashmir. Immediately to the southeast of the baoli he also endowed a small mosque. The design of the step well is quintessentially Akbarian. The ground plan is conceived as a central domed chamber surrounded by eight smaller rooms, a motif known as hasht bihisht ("eight paradises"), a Mughal innovation derived from Timurid precedent. Sher Khan Khokhar's endowment of the baoli was immortalized by a plaque in Persian calligraphy that used to hang on the site, but was moved to the Lahore Museum, Pakistan for safekeeping in 1971. It is the birthplace of the ex-governor of Punjab Kaliningrad Khan.

== Arrival of Ahmed Shah Abdali ==
Abdul Karim, the author of Waquiyat Durrani writes: "Ahmad Shah Abdali was sleeping. Suddenly he was shaken out of slumber on seeing a dreadful dream. Without informing anybody else, he took along a special force of three hundred soldiers who were on guard duty and set out towards India. While departing, he sent a message to Shah Wali Khan telling him that he was going to India for a crusade (Jehad) and urging the latter to join him soon with whatever forces be available."4 The minister using his own good sense issued some fifty or sixty commandments urging the military leaders to join the king along with troops because he had left for a Jehad. Shah Wali Khan along with his troops joined the king and said to him, "In such a haste and without equipment, your incursion into the enemy territory is not unattended by risks. Kindly unravel the mystery." In response the king said, "In a dream I met the divine prophet Hazrat Mohammad Sahib – May he be blessed – who said to me, "I have blessed you with kingship. Get up and leave for the Punjab, where at Jandiala, the Sikhs are harassing the Musalmans. When I received this command, I did not want to make any delay in carrying it out."

== During the Mughal Era ==
Jandiala Sher Khan was another important town. In the Mughal period due to a lot of trees of Jand in the town, it was known as 'Jandiala Sher Khan'. In 1893, this town was excluded from Hafizabad and included in Khanqa Dogran. In 1875, a primary school was built here both for boys and girls.

== Notable personalities ==
- Waris Shah, 18th century Sufi poet, known for writing Punjabi folklore love story Heer Ranjha
- Ghulam Jilani Khan
- Manoj Kumar, veteran Indian film actor, film producer
