= Visaji Krushna Biniwale =

18th-century Indian soldier

Visaji Krushna Chinchalkar, popularly known as Visaji Pant Biniwale, was one of the leading generals of Peshwas in Northern India during 1759 to 1772. Peshwa Madhavrao I mainly sought his assistance in his attempt to restore Maratha Empire in the North after the defeat in the Battle of Panipat (1761).

== Early life ==
Visaji Krushna was born in a Karhade Brahmin family having surname ‘Chinchalkar’.There is no mention as to his year of birth, however, it must be around 1730. He got the title ‘Biniwale’ (which means a person at the front) during his career as a Military General since his troops would remain at the front of the Maratha army during battles.

== Military career ==
Visaji Krushna started his career during the rule of Peshwa Balaji Bajirao as the leader of the Peshwa's hunts in early 1750s. During the 1750s he was responsible for victories in Kadapa in southern India. The Peshwa after Visaji return honoured him with the title Biniwale. On 10 October 1759, Visaji Krushna defeated Nizam's troops and conquered the fort of Ahmednagar. In 1760–1761, he fought in the Panipat war under the leadership of Sadashivrao Bhau. In 1769, he marched towards Udaipur along with his senior Ramchandra Ganesh Kanade. The Rajputs there agreed to pay him Rs.60 lakhs in the tribute. On 5 April 1770, he defeated Jats of Haryana. In October 1770 he vanquished Najib Khan Rohilla, the main opponent of the Battle of Panipat (1761). In November 1771, he was appointed ‘In Charge of the Northern front of Marathas’ by Peshwa Madhavrao I. In February 1772, along with Mahadji Shinde, he overpowered the Rohilkhand at Shukratal by defeating Zabita Khan. He avenged the defeat of Panipat by breaking the tomb of Najib Khan, by looting the artillery and wealth of the Rohillas and by recovering from them an additional tribute of Rs.40 lakhs.Mahadji Shinde made his mark as a Maratha general while serving with Biniwale in North India. During his northern campaign Biniwale persuaded the Moghul emperor Shah Alam to return to Delhi and reclaim his throne in 1771

Shah Alam spent six years in the Allahabad fort and after the capture of Delhi in 1771 by the Marathas, left for his capital in under their protection. He was escorted to Delhi by Mahadaji Shinde and left Allahabad in May 1771. During their short stay, Marathas constructed two temples in the Allahabad city, one of them being the famous Alopi Devi Mandir. After reaching Delhi in January 1772 and realising the Maratha intent of territorial encroachment, however, Shah Alam ordered his general Najaf Khan to drive them out. In retaliation, Tukoji Rao Holkar and Visaji Krushna Biniwale attacked Delhi and defeated Mughal forces in 1772. The Marathas were granted an imperial sanad for Kora and Allahabad. They turned their attention to Oudh to gain these two territories. Shuja was however, unwilling to give them up and made appeals to the English and the Marathas did not fare well at the Battle of Ramghat. The Maratha and British armies fought in Ram Ghat, but the deaths of Peshwa Madhavrao I and Narayanrao in quick succession and the resultant civil war in Pune to choose the next Peshwa forced the Maratha forces iunder Biniwale to retreat.

== Honor by Peshwa Madhavrao ==
Peshwa Madhavrao I was so delighted with Visaji Krushna's grand victory in the Rohilkhand that he specifically mentioned in his written will to shower golden flowers on him during his arrival at the border of Pune.

== First Anglo-Maratha war ==
Biniwale played a major role during the first Anglo-Maratha War that lasted from 1774 to 1783. Historian Kantak blames him, and Ramkrishna Kanade for the lose of forts at Sashti and Vasai to the British East India Company forces.

== Later life and death ==
When Visaji Krushna arrived to Pune from North, he brought with him huge jewelry and cash of not less than Rs.22 lakhs. Meanwhile, Peshwa Madhavrao I had died and Peshwa Narayanrao was murdered. Hence, Visaji Krushna was welcomed by Peshwa Raghunath Rao and he was showered with the golden flowers as wished by Peshwa Madhavrao I in his will. Upon realising Raghunath Rao's involvement in Narayanrao's murder, Visaji Krushna joined hands with ‘Nana Phadnis’ to restore Peshwa Sawai Madhavrao on the Peshwa throne. There is no reference found as to his date of death and cause thereof, so, presumably, it was not on the battlefield.

== Bibliography ==
- ‘Marathi Riyasat Volume V’ (Marathi) by Govind Sakharam Sardesai
- ‘Marathi Riyasat Volume VI’ (Marathi) by Govind Sakharam Sardesai
- ‘Peshvyanchi Bakhar’ (Marathi) Editorial notes by R.V.Herwadkar
