= Capture of Delhi (1771) =

Maratha military offensive

Date	10 February 1771
Location	Delhi, India
Result	Maratha victory
Territorial changes	Delhi recaptured by the Maratha Empire

Belligerents
Kingdom of Rohilkhand	Maratha Empire; Supported by Mughal Empire

Commanders and leaders
Zabita Khan; René-Marie Madec; Walter Reinhardt	Mahadji Scindia; Visaji Krushna; Mirza Najaf Khan

In 1771, the forces of the Maratha Empire led by Mahadaji Shinde captured Delhi from the Rohillas and installed the Mughal emperor Shah Alam II on the throne of Delhi. The Marathas defeated Zabita Khan Rohilla who was put in charge by the Afghans.

After taking control of Delhi, the Marathas sent a large army of around 50,000 soldiers under leadership of Shinde and Holkar in 1772 to punish Afghan Rohillas for their involvement in Panipat and slaughtered thousands of Rohillas. They desecrated the grave of Rohilla chieftain Najib ad-Dawla and captured Najibabad. With the fleeing of the Rohillas, the rest of the country was burnt, with the exception of the city of Amroha. The Rohillas who could offer no resistance fled to the Terai region.

In the Third Battle of Panipat, the Maratha Empire suffered a serious blow at the hands of the Afghan Empire, the Nawab of Awadh and the Kingdom of Rohilkhand under Najib ad-Dawlah. After the death of Peshwa Balaji Bajirao, Madhavrao I became the Peshwa under the regency of Raghunathrao. Mahadji Shinde's victory over the Jats of Mathura, Rajputs of Rajasthan and Pashtuns-Rohillas of Rohilkhand (in the western part of present-day Uttar Pradesh state) re-established Maratha rule in the region.

== Capture ==
The Peshwa's instructions ended the passive policy and advocated for a strong stance against the Rohillas. Visaji Krishna demanded nazar from Zabita Khan, who refused and was expelled from the camp. The Maratha army marched to Delhi, where Saif-i-uddin Muhammad Khan secured the peaceful surrender of the city. However, Zabita Khan's troops inside the fort refused to submit, leading to a breach in the ramparts. The Marathas entered Delhi on February 10, 1771, with a force of 3,000 horses and slaughtering the Rohillas. They presented nazar (Note: gifts) and professed allegiance to the emperor, seizing the surrounding area and removing Najib's appointees. The Maratha chiefs demanded 40 lakhs of rupees for restoring the emperor, the cession of Meerut and neighboring districts and the right to appoint imperial officials below the Wazir and receive half of their nuar. Saif-ud-din Muhammad Khan accepted these terms on behalf of the emperor and forwarded them for ratification.
