= Mahadaji Pant Guruji =

Mahadaji Ballal Karkare (also known as Mahadaji Pant 'Guruji') was an accountant, Special Envoy of Peshwas, tutor and advisor of Peshwa Madhavrao I and Sawai Madhavrao. He was preceptor of Peshwa Madhavrao (I), when he was a child. He afterwards became Peshwa's domestic priest. Later he was his private treasurer. (Reference: History Book: Tawareekh-E-ShindeShahi)

== Early life ==
Mahadaji Pant Karkare (Ballal) was born in a Karhade Brahmin family in a village in Ratnagiri district in Western Maharashtra. He was a scholar of Sanskrit scriptures, Marathi literature and Civics.

== Family ==
The Karkare Ballal family belongs to Ratnagiri (Maharashtra). This family is considered very close to the family of Peshwa from the times of Balaji Vishwanath Bhat Ballal (who also was from Ratnagiri). A distant relative, or may be cousin, of Mahadji Pant Karkare was Sakharam Moreshwar Karkare Ballal. Sakharam Moreshwar Karkare Ballal was appointed as chief of the troop of the personal bodyguards of Peshwa Vishwas Rao Balaji during the battle of Panipat - 1761. Records of the Peshwa Office states, that Sakharam Moreshwar Karkare was killed in action while fighting with the troops of Shah Wali Khan of Afghanistan in the south of Ugrakhedi and north of Risalu villages near Panipat. (Tawareekh-E-ShindeShahi)

== Early career ==
In the Peshwa's court in Pune, Mahadaji Pant joined as a clerk and gradually reached at the post of ‘Auditor General'. Peshwa Nanasaheb simultaneously appointed him as 'Guruji' that is ‘Tutor’ of his son Madhavrao I. In 1763, when Nana Phadnis was expelled by Madhavrao I for few months, he was re-appointed on the strong recommendation by Guruji. In October 1766, Madhavrao I sought Guruji’s assistance to give systematic and disciplined shape to the Maratha army on the southern front.

== Later career and death ==
After the death of Madhavrao I and subsequent murder of Narayanrao, Nana Phadnis re-appointed Guruji to take charge of Peshwa Sawai Madhavrao as his student. The Peshwa had been making his academic progress under the guidance and supervision of Guruji until his death. In 1778, before starting his Kolhapur campaign, the warrior "Shreenath" Mahadji Shinde got his demands fulfilled from the Peshwa's Court through Mahadjipant Karkare Ballal Guruji's arbitration. There is no mention found regarding Guruji's death.
