= Ramabai Peshwa =

Wife of Indian emperor (circa 1750–1772)

Peshwin Rama Bai
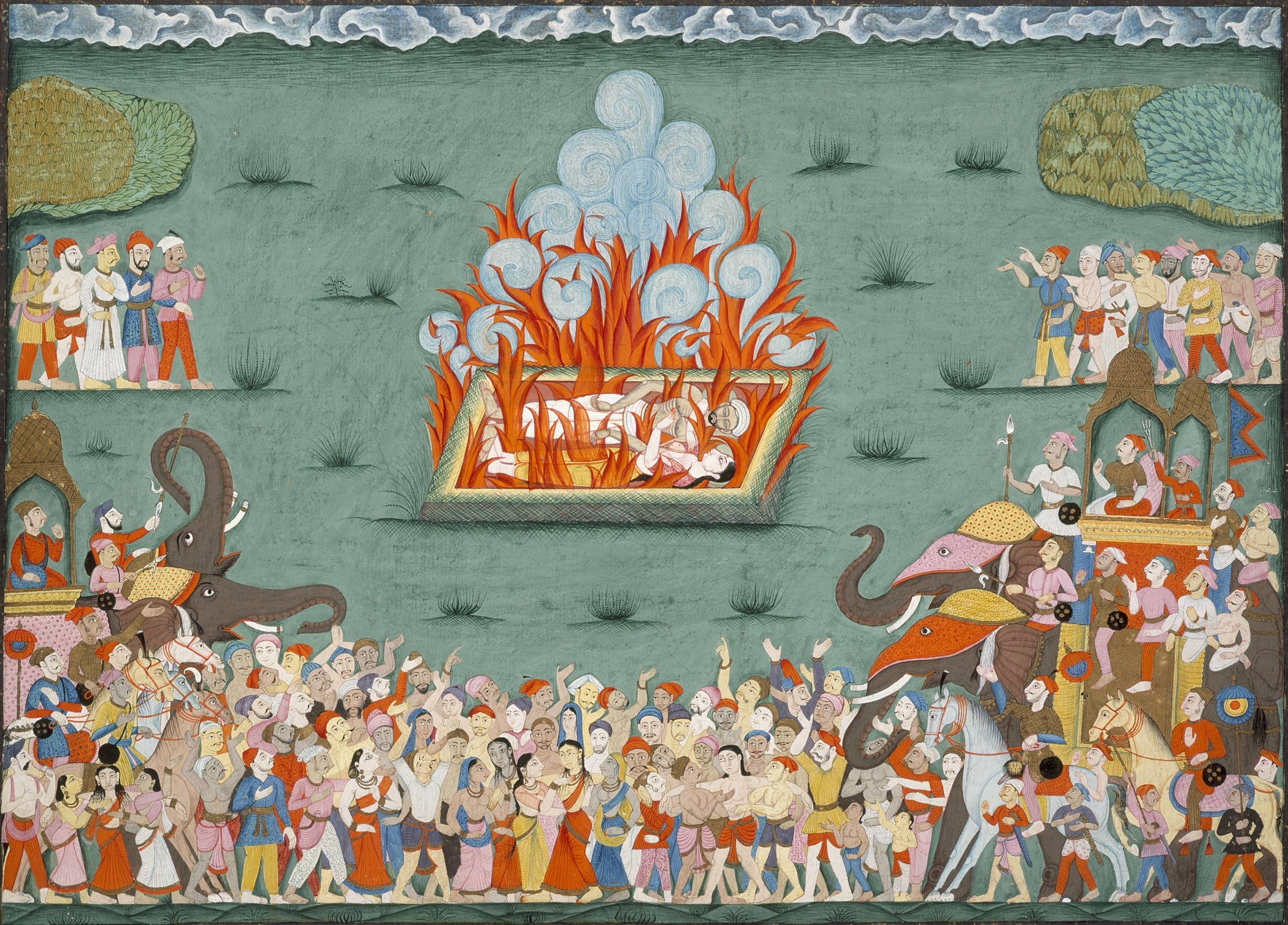
- The sati (self-immolation) of Ramabai
- Born: c. 1750
- Died: 1772
- Cause of death: Sati (self-immolation)
- Spouse: Madhavrao I

Rama
- House: Bhat (by marriage); Joshi (by birth)

Ramabai (c. 1750–1772) was the wife of Madhavrao Peshwa I. Her father's name was Shivaji Ballal Joshi from Solapur.

== Biography ==
She had gone to Harihareshwar in 1772 when Madhavrao's health was very serious. She always kept fasts for Madhavrao. The couple had no children.

She was very spiritual and religious. She never intervened in social or political matters. She was described as a great person and caring for all. Though her mother in law Gopika bai peshwa, however, reportedly did not treat her well.

On 18 November 1772, Madhavrao died in the temple premises of Chintamani, Theur. Thousands of citizens visited the site and paid their last respects to their departed leader.

After Madhavrao's death, Ramabai wished to perform sati (self-immolation). The peshwa family including Anandibai, Raghunathrao, and Narayan Rao tried to stop her but she didn't budge. Some sources believe that she had asked Madhavrao for his permission to perform sati before he died. on his funeral pyre on the same date. Madhavrao was cremated on the banks of the Bhima river which was about half a mile from the temple.

A small memorial carved out of stone rests today at this place as a reminder of this leader and his wife.

== In popular culture ==
- Ramabai Peshwa's character was essayed in a novel called Swami written by Ranjit Desai
- In the 1987 TV series, actress Mrinal Dev-Kulkarni played the role of Ramabai in a television series called Swami on the TV channel Doordarshan
- In the 1994 Hindi TV series The Great Maratha, Ramabai's character was portrayed by Madhura Deo.
- In the 2014 movie Rama Madhav, actress Parna Pethe played the role of Ramabai

== Memorial ==
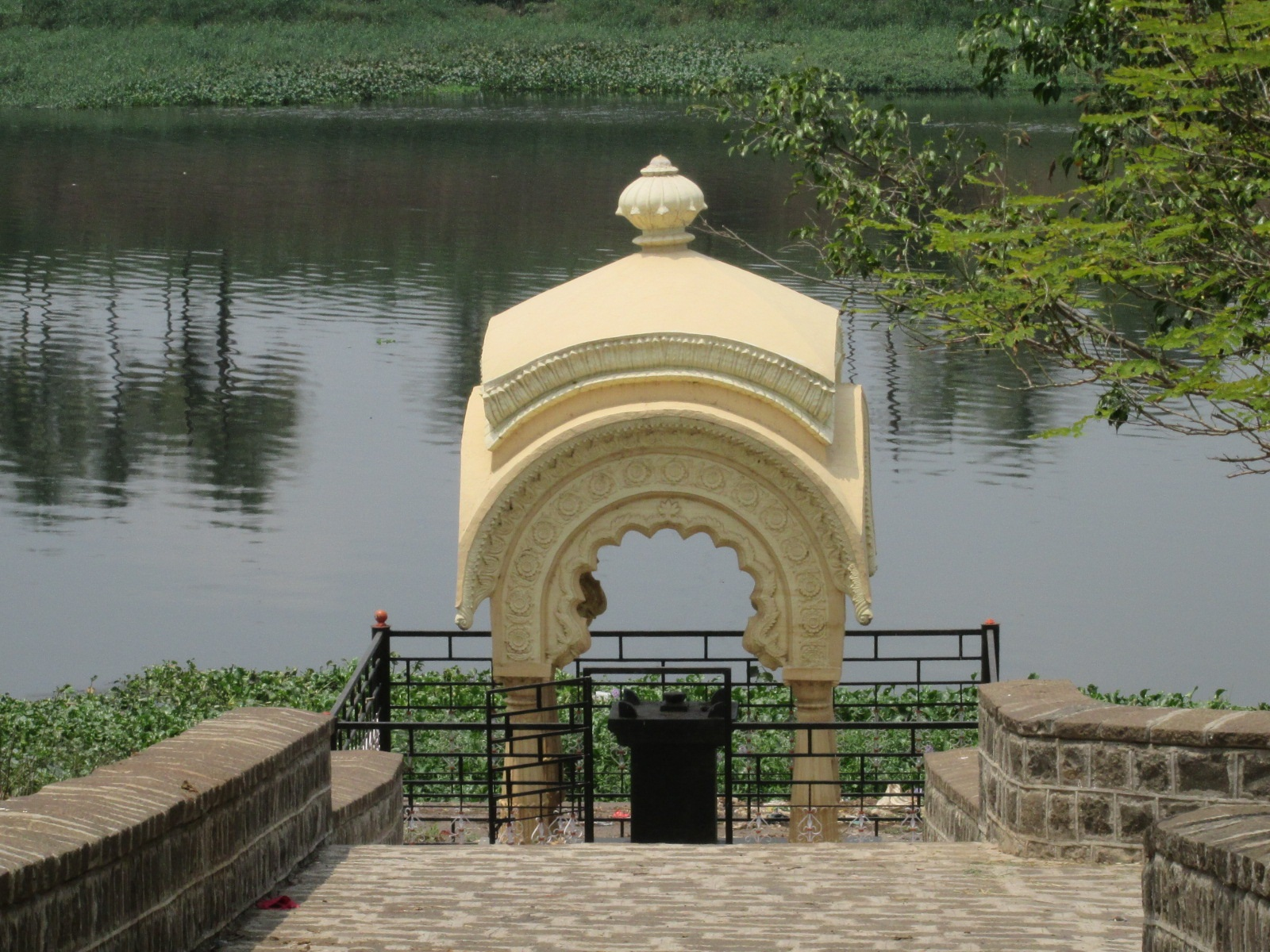
A memorial marking the death place of Ramabai Peshwa. Ramabai was married to Madhavrao I on 9 December 1758 in Pune. She accompanied Madhavrao I during Karnataka expedition in 1766–67. She made pilgrimages, like that of Shrivardhan and Harihareshwar.

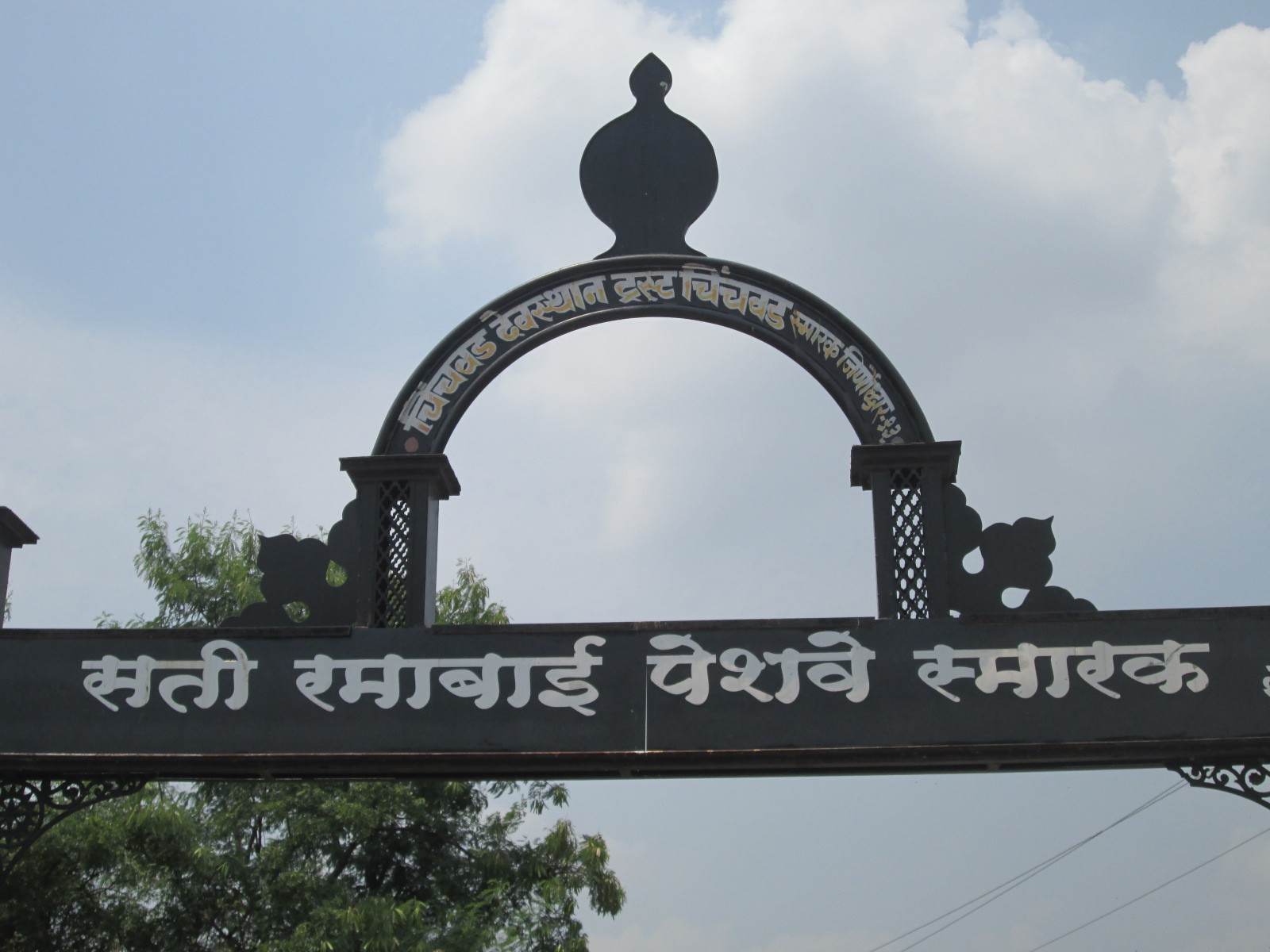
A memorial marking the death place of Ramabai Peshwa (1750-1772), wife of Madhavrao Ballal Peshwa (18th century Indian Premier, Statesman, Patriot). The memorial is located in the town of Theur, Maharashtra.

== See also ==
- Maratha Empire
- Madhavrao Ballal Peshwa
- Bhat family
