= Sakharam Bapu Bokil =

Minister and diplomat in Pune, India

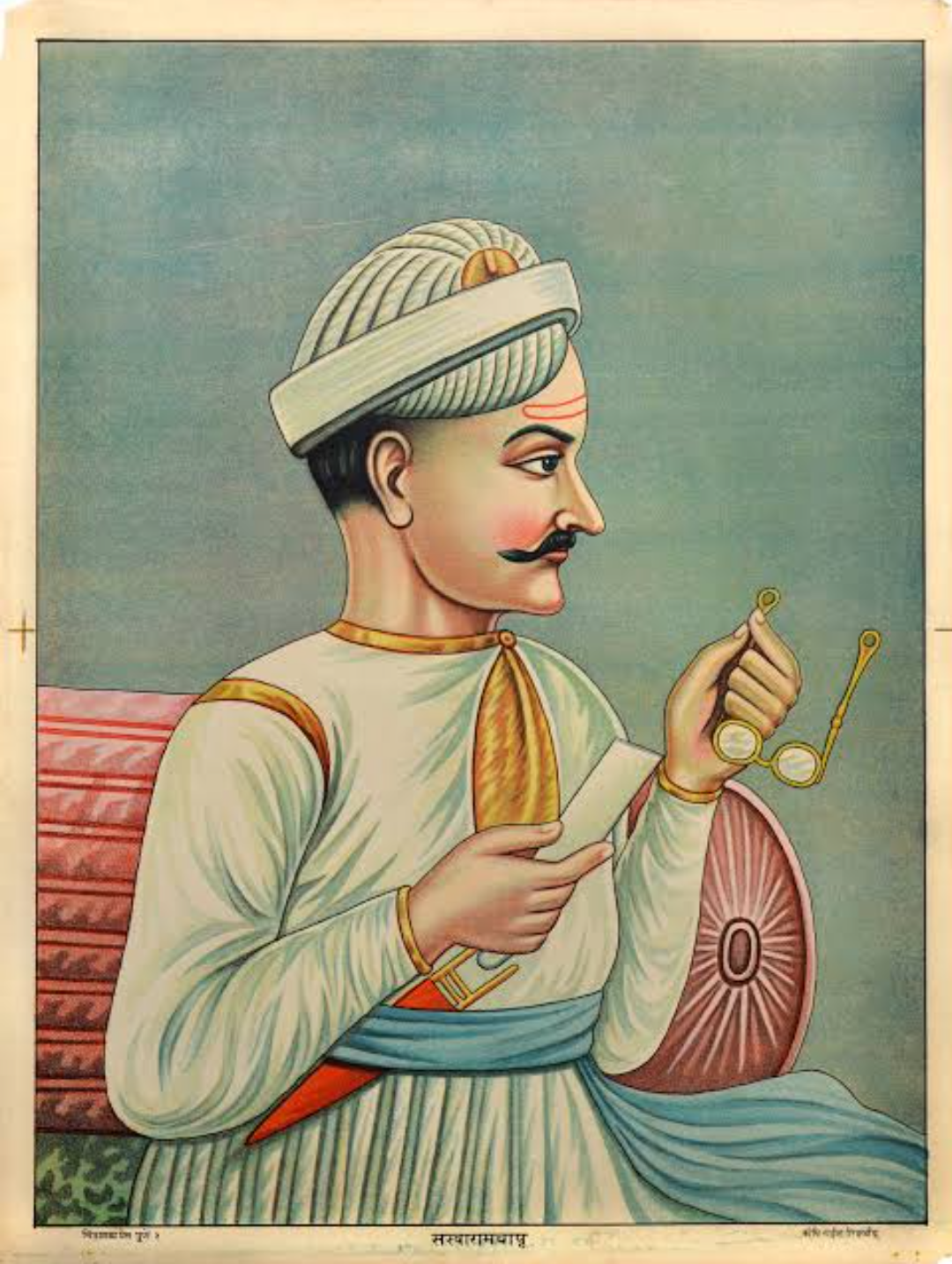
- Portrait of Sakharam Bapu Bokil
- Born: Sakharam Bhagwant Bokil; 1700
- Died: 2 August 1781 (aged 80–81); Raigad, Maratha Empire (Modern day Maharashtra, India)
- Religion: Hinduism
- Occupation: Prominent minister, regent to Madhavrao II, and statesman of the Maratha Empire during the Peshwa administration

Sakharam Bapu Bokil (also known as Sakharam Bapu, Sakharam Hari Bokil or Sakharam Bhau), born Sakharam Bhagwant Bokil, was an influential minister, diplomat and statesman of the Maratha Empire during the Peshwa administration in Pune, India. Before joining the Peshwa administration at Pune, Sakharam was the Kulkarni of Hivare.

In Maharashtra and Hyderabad, there were known to be three and a half great men - or wise diplomats. The three and a half wise men were popularly known as Devā, Sakhyā, Vitthe and Nānā. Devā stood for Devāśipant, Sakhyā for Sakhārām Băpu Bokil, Vitthal for Vithal Sundar at the Court of the Nizām and Nānā for the famous Nana Phadnavis. Vitthal Sundar was the Prime Minister of Nizam and died in the famous battle of Rakshasbhuvan on 10 August 1763. Devajipant Chorghade of Narkhed and the other two and half wise men were in Poona and Nagpur. Sakharam Bapu Bokil was one full wise man while Nana Phadnavis was a half wise man. He was the hereditary Kulkarni of Hiware village which was bestowed as a prize upon his ancestor Pantaji Gopinath. He was a clerk with Mahadji Purandare. He died at Raigadh.

== Early life ==
Sakharam Bapu was born into a Deshastha Rigvedi Brahmin family of Jamadagni gotra. Their Kuldevi is Kolhapur Mahalakshmi and Kuldeva is Khandoba of Jejuri. He is a descendant of Pantaji Gopinath, who had helped Shivaji defeat Afzal Khan at Pratapgad. Sakharam Bapu is the son of Somnath Raoji, who was the Dabir and foreign minister of the Maratha Empire and incharge of the Berar conquests, he also served in the Konkan wars. Sakharam Bapu was the favourite commander and friend of Raghunathrao Peshwa.
