= Madhavrao I =

Peshwa of Maratha Empire from 1761 to 1772

Shrimant Peshwa Madhavrao I
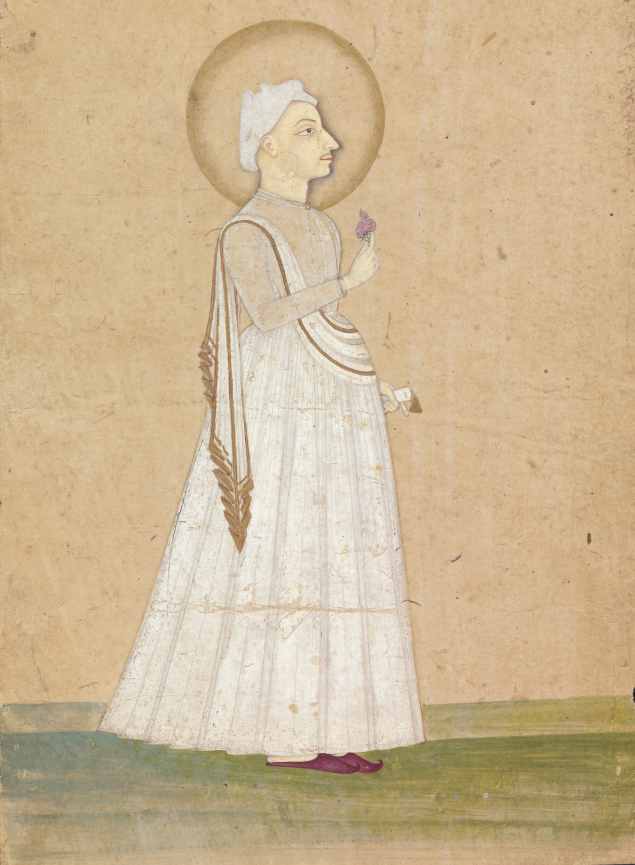
- Portrait of Madhavrao I by Bhoj Raj at the Yale Center for British Art c. 1763

9th Peshwa of the Maratha Empire
- In office 23 June 1761 – 18 November 1772
- Monarch: Rajaram II of Satara
- Preceded by: Balaji Baji Rao
- Succeeded by: Narayanrao

Personal details
- Born: Madhavrao Bhat; 15 February 1745 Savanur, Savanur State (modern day Karnataka, India)
- Died: 18 November 1772 (aged 27) Theur, Pune, Maratha Confederacy (modern day Pune district, Maharashtra, India)
- Spouse: Ramabai (m. 1758)
- Parents: Balaji Baji Rao (father); Gopikabai (mother)
- Relatives: Vishwasrao (elder brother); Narayanrao (younger brother); Sadashivrao Bhau (uncle); Raghunathrao (uncle); Shamsher Bahadur I (uncle); Bajirao I (grandfather); Kashibai (grandmother)
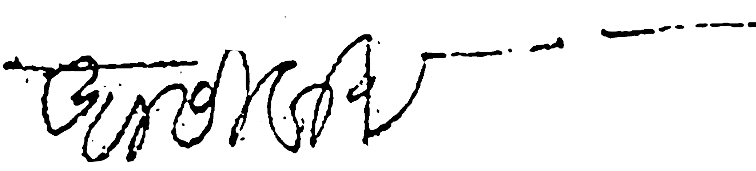
- Signature

Military service
- Battles/wars: Maratha–Mysore wars; Capture of Delhi (1771); Battle of Alegaon; Battle of Rakshasbhuvan

Madhavrao I (15 February 1745 – 18 November 1772), also known as Madhavrao Ballal Bhat (Marathi: माधवराव पेशवे), was the ninth Peshwa of the Maratha Empire, ruling from 1761 until his death in 1772. He was the second son of Balaji Baji Rao and the grandson of Bajirao I. Madhavrao assumed the office of Peshwa at the age of sixteen following the Marathas' defeat in the Third Battle of Panipat in 1761. His reign included a period of political and administrative recovery known as the "Maratha Resurrection", during which the empire reasserted authority over territories lost following the Third Battle of Panipat.

Madhavrao restructured the administration, reduced corruption, and revived the empire's finances. Under his leadership, the Marathas reasserted their authority over several regions of the western and southern Indian subcontinent, notably the Carnatic region, Mysore, and Hyderabad through administrative reforms and military campaigns.

Madhavrao worked to maintain unity within the Maratha Confederacy through diplomacy and political negotiation. He promoted trade, sought to improve revenue collection, and introduced measures aimed at supporting agricultural stability during his time as prime minister.

== Early life and ascendancy to Peshwa ==
Madhavrao I was the second son of Peshwa Balaji Bajirao, also known as Nanasaheb, and his wife Gopikabai. He was born in Savnur on 15 February 1745. He was the grandson of Bajirao I and Kashibai, the younger brother of Vishwasrao, and the elder brother of Narayanrao.

Following the Third Battle of Panipat in 1761, Madhavrao's early years were marked by political turbulence. During the battle, his elder brother Vishwasrao and uncle Sadashivrao Bhau were killed. His father Balaji Baji Rao died shortly afterward.

Following his father's death, Madhavrao, then sixteen years old, was declared the next Peshwa of the Maratha Confederacy on 21 June 1761. His paternal uncle Raghunathrao (also known as Raghoba Dada) initially served as regent and exercised considerable influence in the early years of his rule.

In 1753, Madhavrao married Ramabai, the daughter of Trimbakrao Bapusaheb Patwardhan, a Maratha noble from the Pathwardhan family. When Madhavrao died in 1772, Ramabai chose to perform sati, immolating herself on his funeral pyre at Theur.

== Disputes with Raghunath Rao ==
On 22 August 1762, Raghunath Rao moved to Vadgaon Maval and assembled an army in opposition to the Peshwa. To finance his campaign, Raghunath Rao's forces reportedly plundered nearby villages. In response, Madhavrao declared war on his uncle on 7 November 1762. He subsequently proposed a peace treaty in an effort to avoid prolonged civil conflict.

Raghunath Rao initially agreed to the terms, but shortly after the treaty was signed, he broke it and attacked Madhavrao's camp. Madhavrao was defeated in the Battle of Alegaon on 12 November 1762, and subsequently surrendered near Alegaon.

Following the surrender, Raghunath Rao assumed control of the Peshwa administration with the assistance of Sakharam Bapu Bokil. He sought to strengthen his position by forming an alliance with the Nizam of Hyderabad, but this alliance proved short-lived, as the Nizam began encroaching upon Maratha territories. Madhavrao appealed to his uncle to take action, but when diplomacy failed, he resumed command of the Maratha forces.

Under Madhavrao's leadership, the Peshwa army marched toward Aurangabad on 7 March 1763, targeting the Nizam's domains. The opposing forces met at the Battle of Rakshasbhuvan near Aurangabad on 10 August 1763. The Nizam's army suffered heavy losses and was forced to retreat.

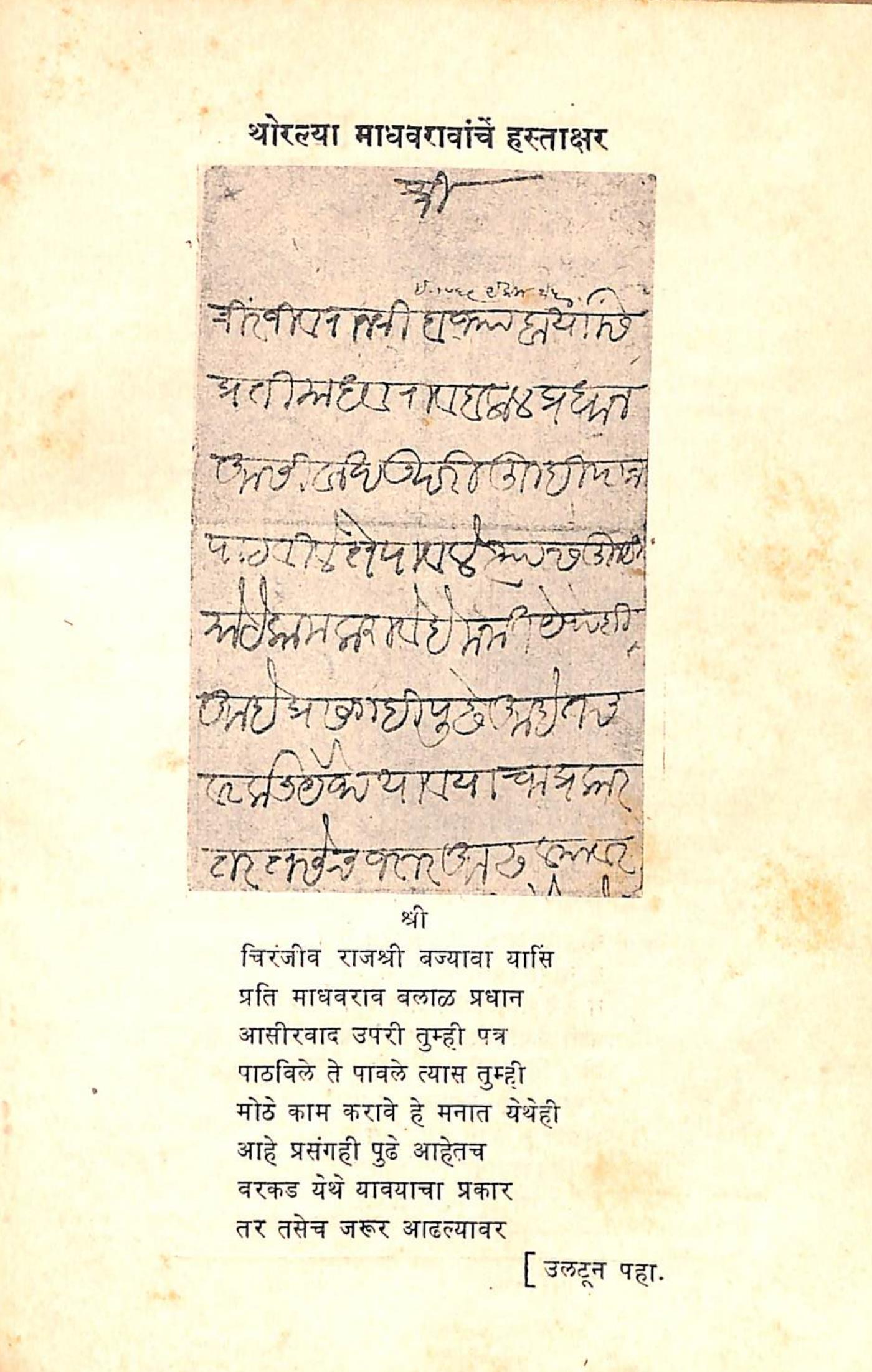
A handwritten letter by Madhavrao I

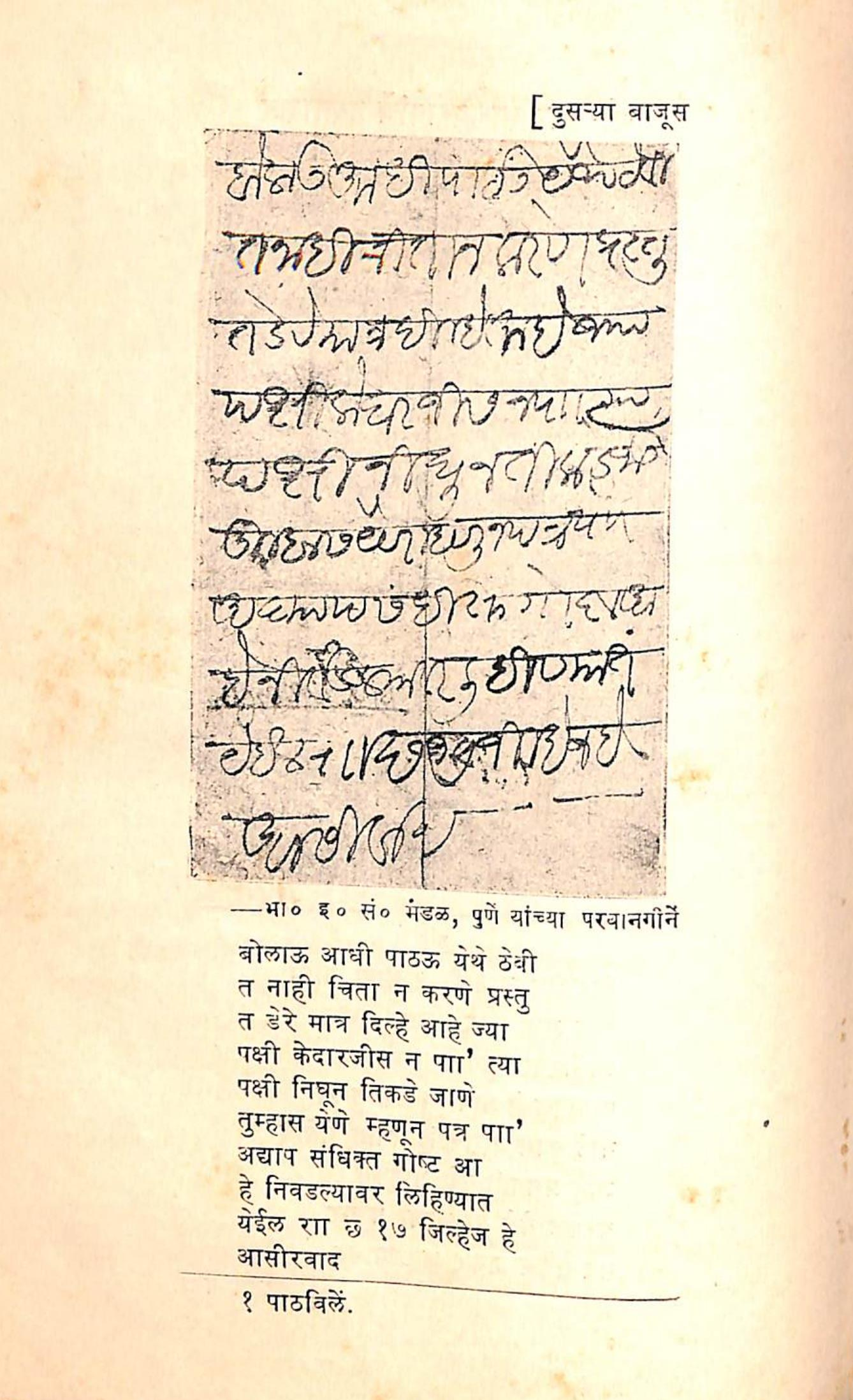
Continued letter by Madhavrao I

== The War Against Hyder Ali and Mysore ==
In January 1764, Madhavrao I reorganised his forces and launched a campaign against Hyder Ali of Mysore. This expedition was commanded by several Maratha generals, including Gopalrao Patwardhan, Murarirao Ghorpade, Vinchurkar, and Naro Shankar. Although Raghunath Rao was invited to participate, he declined and withdrew to Nashik. The campaign lasted for nearly a year and extended across large parts of the former Sira Subah in present-day Karnataka.

Hyder Ali avoided capture during the campaign, though the Marathas gained territory in the region. In November 1764, with the assistance of Gopalrao and Anand Rao Patwardhan, the Marathas captured the Dharwad Fort, leaving only Bankapura under Hyder Ali's control. Madhavrao's forces also defeated Hyder Ali in several engagements, including the Battle of Jadi Hanvatti and the Battle of Rattihalli.

As the campaign continued, Madhavrao sought additional support from Raghunath Rao, but his uncle instead entered into a separate peace agreement with Hyder Ali. In 1767, Madhavrao launched a second expedition against Mysore. Supported by defectors from Hyder Ali's camp, Madhavrao won victories at Sira and Madhugiri. During the siege of Madhugiri, he discovered Queen Virammaji, the last ruler of the Keladi Nayaka Kingdom, and her young son, who had been imprisoned by Hyder Ali. Madhavrao arranged for their release and sent them to Pune. The Marathas subsequently incorporated the Sira Subah into their dominions.

== Alliance with Nizam ==
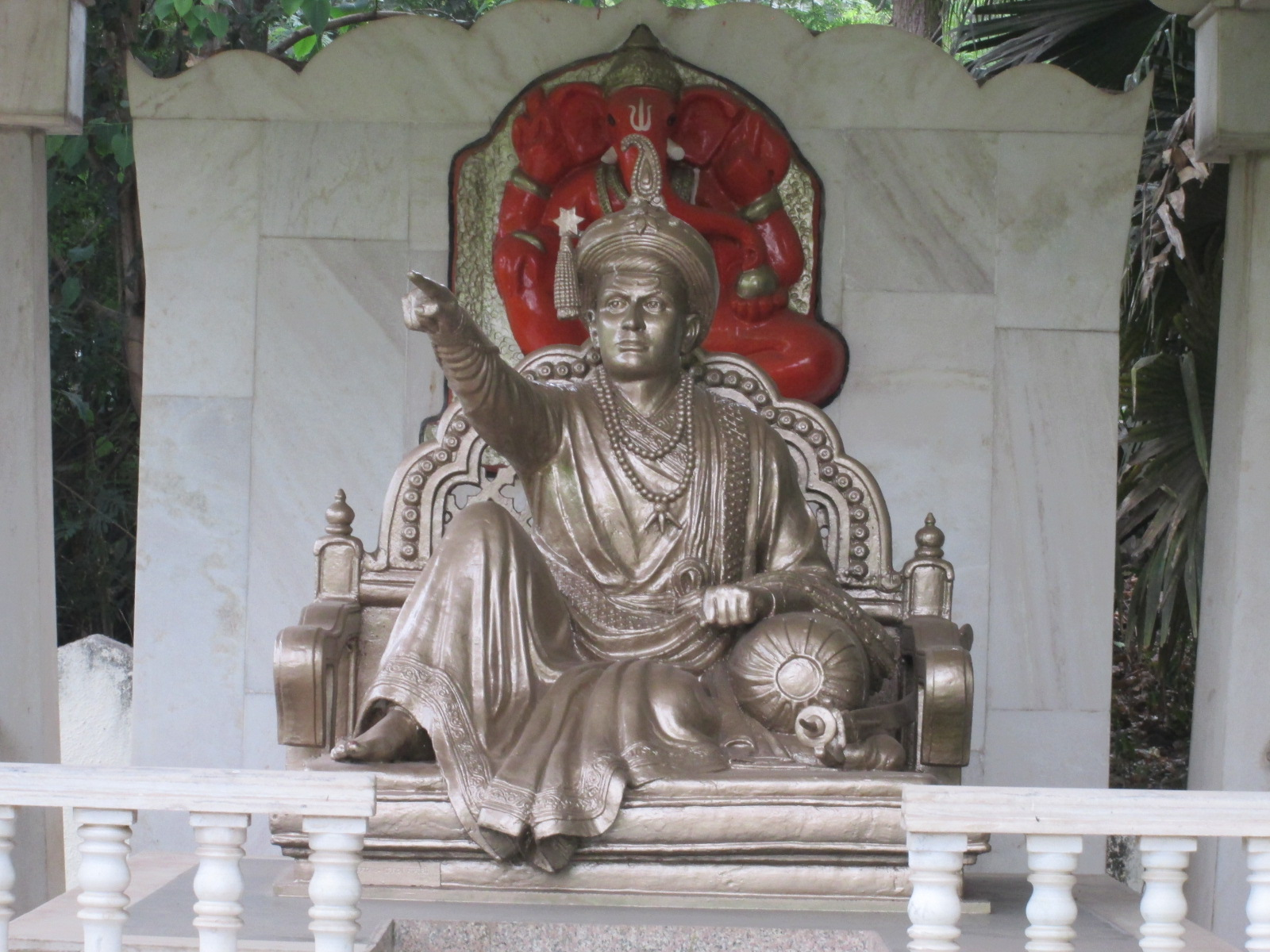
Memorial commemorating Madhavrao I at Peshwe Park in Pune, India

During Madhavrao's reign, the Maratha Empire continued its efforts to reassert control over territories in the northern Indian subcontinent. Raghunath Rao, along with the Holkars and Shindes (Scindias), led a northern expedition toward Delhi to extend Maratha influence in the region.

Meanwhile, Madhavrao sought to consolidate the empire's position in the Deccan by reconciling with Nizam Ali Khan, Asaf Jah II. The Nizam also expressed willingness to improve relations with the Marathas, and the two leaders met at Kurumkhed on 5 February 1766.

== Relations with the East India Company ==
On 3 December 1767, a representative of the East India Company, Thomas Mostyn, arrived at Pune with a proposal to establish British military presence in Vasai and Sashti in exchange for the territories of Bidnur and Sonda, but the offer was declined by Madhavrao.

== Raghunath Rao faces house arrest ==
Although Raghunath Rao led an expedition northward to expand the Maratha Empire, the campaign did not achieve its intended success. Upon returning to Anandvalli, Raghunath Rao sought to consolidate power by forming alliances with certain generals and officials to challenge Madhavrao I. His repeated efforts created instability within the Peshwa administration.

In response, Madhavrao mobilised forces on June 10, 1768, and confronted Raghunath Rao. Raghunath Rao was defeated, captured, and placed under house arrest at the Shaniwar Wada. His key advisor, Sakharam Bapu Bokil, was also detained.

This action allowed Madhavrao to reassert his authority over the Maratha administration. Following Raghunath Rao's confinement, Madhavrao focused on consolidating internal governance, strengthening administrative institutions, and continuing military campaigns to recover Maratha territories lost after the Third Battle of Panipat.

== Northern campaign ==
In 1769, Peshwa Madhavrao I sent a Maratha army under the command of Ramchandra Ganesh Kanade and Visaji Krushna Biniwale to recover territories lost in the north following the Third Battle of Panipat. They were joined by Mahadji Shinde and Tukoji Rao Holkar. The Maratha forces marched towards Udaipur, where the local Rajput rulers agreed to pay a tribute of 60 lakh rupees. On 5 April 1770, the Marathas defeated the Jats of Bharatpur.

In October 1770, the Marathas defeated Najib Khan Rohilla. In November 1771, Visaji Krushna Biniwale was appointed in charge of the Maratha Northern Front by Peshwa Madhavrao I. In February 1772, Biniwale and Mahadji Shinde defeated the Rohillas of Rohilkhand led by Zabita Khan at Shukratal, causing heavy bloodshed and the deaths of over 70,000 Rohilla Pashtuns (Pathans). They desecrated Najib Khan's tomb, looted artillery, and collected an additional tribute of 40 lakh rupees. Mahadji Shinde emerged as a significant military leader during this campaign.

During the northern campaign, Biniwale persuaded the Mughal Emperor Shah Alam II to return to Delhi in 1771 and reclaim his throne.

The Maratha capture of Delhi in 1771, led by Mahadji Shinde, restored Mughal emperor Shah Alam II to the throne at the Red Fort under Maratha protection. The Marathas captured Delhi from Najib Khan's son Zabita Khan, who had been appointed by the Afghans.

Shah Alam II, who had spent six years in Allahabad Fort, was escorted to Delhi under Maratha protection. During their stay, the Marathas constructed two temples in Allahabad, including the Alopi Devi Mandir.

In January 1772, Shah Alam II ordered his general Najaf Khan to expel the Marathas from Delhi. In response, Tukoji Rao Holkar and Visaji Krushna Biniwale attacked and defeated Mughal forces. The Marathas received imperial sanads for Kora and Allahabad. They then attempted to extend influence over Oudh, but faced resistance from Shuja-ud-Daula and the British. In the ensuing Battle of Ramghat, the Marathas were forced to withdraw due to the death of Peshwa Madhavrao I and the civil war in Pune over his succession.

== Death ==
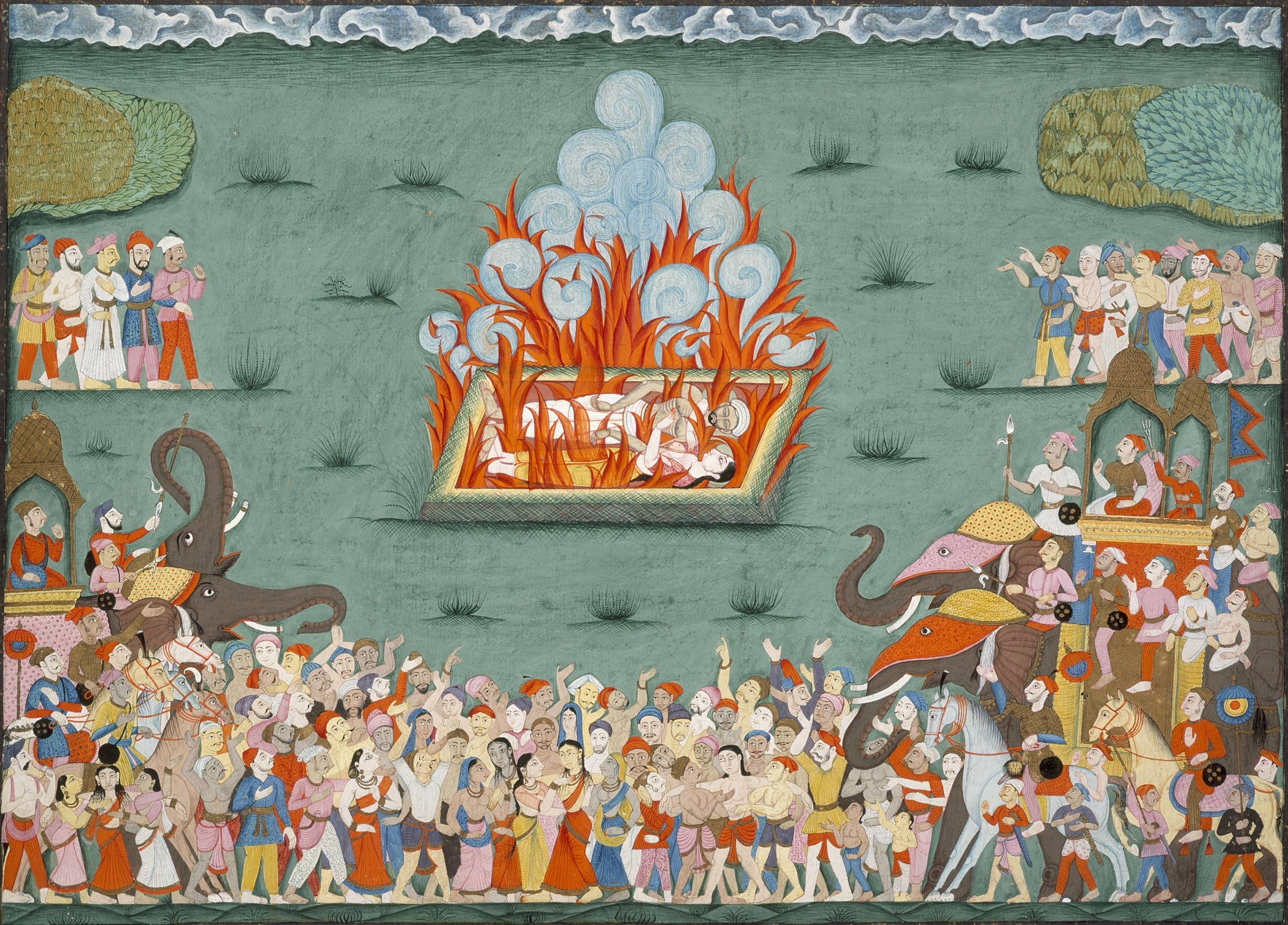
Cremation of Madhavrao I and sati of his wife Ramabai

In June 1770, the Peshwas planned a third campaign against Hyder Ali, but Madhavrao I's health began to decline due to tuberculosis, also referred to in contemporary sources as "Raj-Yakshma" or the "prince of diseases".

Madhavrao was forced to return from Miraj as the disease progressed. An English physician was consulted, but his condition did not improve. He spent his final days at the Ganesha Chintamani Temple in Theur. Historian James Grant Duff argued that the death of Madhavrao I had a more significant impact on the Maratha Empire's decline than the defeat at the Third Battle of Panipat.

Madhavrao died on 18 November 1772 at the temple premises of Chintamani in Theur. His wife, Ramabai, committed sati during the cremation.

== In popular culture ==
- In the 1987 Marathi TV series Swami, Madhavrao's character was portrayed by Ravindra Mannkani.
- In the 1994 Hindi TV series The Great Maratha, Madhavrao's character was portrayed by Rahul Awasthee.
- Alok Rajwade portrayed Madhavrao in the 2014 Indian Marathi-language historical drama, Rama Madhav
- Chinmay Patwardhan plays Madhavrao in the Indian Marathi-language television serial Swamini which airs on Colors Marathi.

== See also ==
- Mahadaji Pant Guruji
- Maratha Peshwa and Generals from Bhat Family
- Maratha emperors

== Sources ==
- Rice, Lewis (1897b), Mysore: A Gazetteer Compiled for the Government, Volume II, Mysore, By Districts, Westminster: Archibald Constable and Company. Pp. xii, 581
- Ranjit Desai, Swami (26th Edition March 2007, published by Mehta Publishers, Marathi Literature).
- Govind Sakharam Sardesai, A New History of Marathas
- James Grant Duff, History of the Marathas London, Longman, Rees, Orme, Brown, and Green (1826)
- Maharashtra Times, माधवराव पेशव्यांचे चित्र आले उजेडात
- श्रीमंत माधवराव पेशवा:व्यक्ति आणि कार्य, लेखक: गुरुप्रसाद कानिटकर, पराग पिंपळखरे
