= Battle of Alegaon =

Ancient Indian war

Internal Maratha civil war and Nizam-Maratha clashes
Date	1762
Location	Alegaon, Taluka: Shirur, District : Pune. 55 km east of Pune Maharashtra
Result	Allied victory

Belligerents
Maratha Empire	Hyderabad State; Maratha Empire

Commanders and leaders
Madhavrao I (surrendered)	Nizam Ali Khan; Raghunathrao

Units involved
15,000-20,000 soldiers (including 2,000 Gardi Infantry)	~50,000 Allied army (40-60 artillery pieces of Nizam)

The Battle of Alegaon was fought between Nizam Ali Khan of Hyderabad and Raghunathrao of the Maratha Empire against Madhavrao I of the Maratha Confederacy. Raghunathrao had established an alliance with Nizam Ali Khan of Hyderabad.

When conflict arose between Raghunathrao and Madhavrao I, a joint campaign by Nizam Ali Khan and Raghunathrao resulted in Madhavrao I being heavily defeated. Madhavrao I surrendered on 12 November 1762. Nizam Ali Khan got all of his territories lost at the Battle of Udgir. Madhavrao I submitted to his uncle, Raghunathrao.
