= Vitthal Sundar =

Prime Minister of Hyderabad

Vitthal Sundar Parshurami
- Raja Pratapwant Bahadur
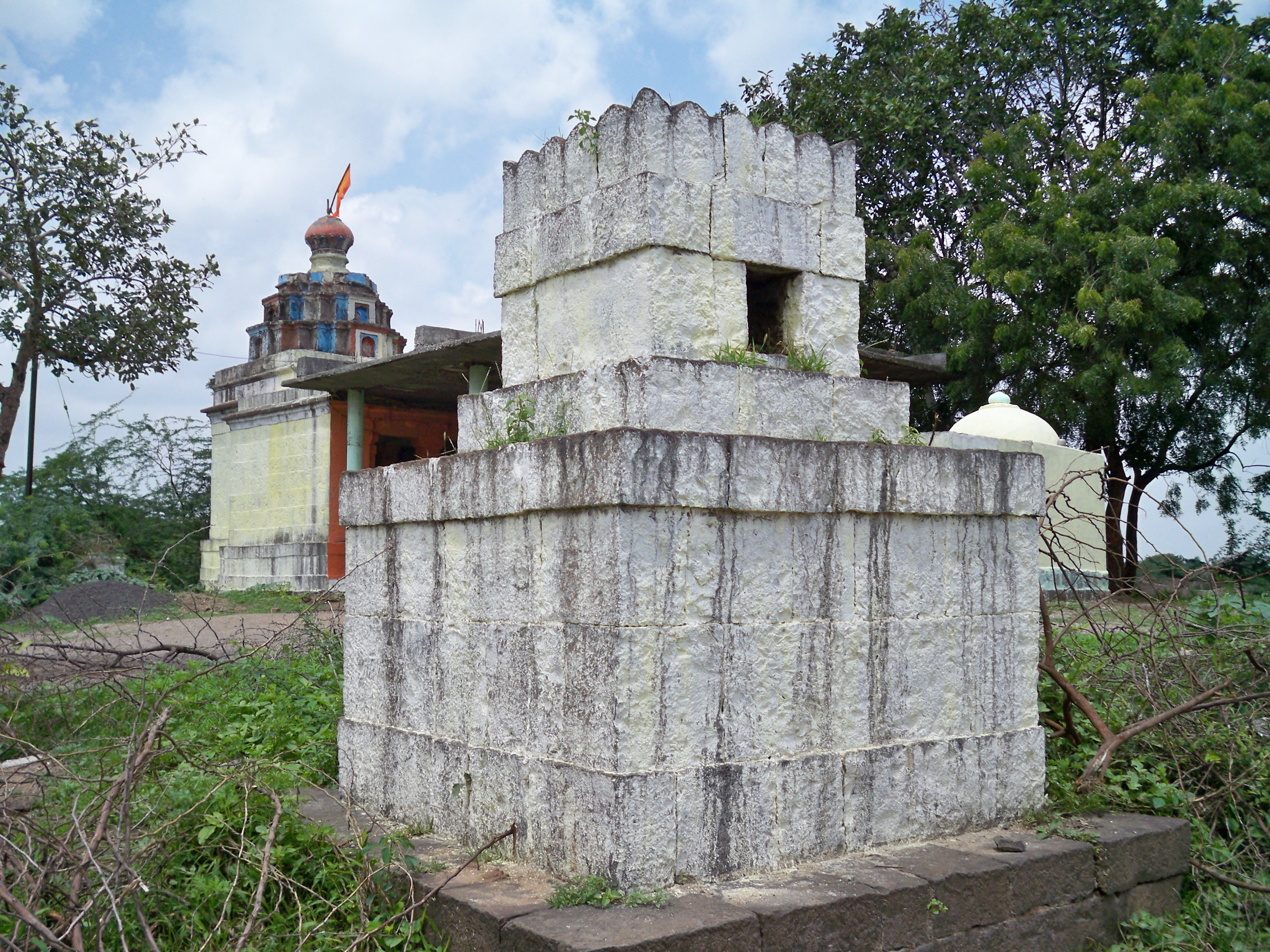
- Samadhi (memorial commemorating the dead) of Vitthal Sundar Parashurami

Prime Minister of the Hyderabad
- Reign: 8 July 1762 – 10 August 1763
- Predecessor: Basalat Jung
- Successor: Musa Khan Nawab Rukn ud-Daula
- Died: 10 August 1763; Rakshasbhuvan (present day in Beed district, Maharashtra)
- Father: Sundar Narayan Parshurami

Vitthal Sundar Parshurami, also Vithal Sundar (died 10 August 1763), was a diplomat and the Prime Minister of Hyderabad (or Diwan) during the reign of Nizam Ali Khan (Asaf Jah II). When Khan was appointed Subedar of the Deccan on 8 July 1762, he immediately appointed Sunder his Diwan and conferred upon him the title Raja Pratapwant. Sunder belonged to the Hindu Deshastha Brahmin sub-caste of Maharashtra. Sundar was the Nizam's commander-in-chief during the Battle of Rakshasbhuvan against the Maratha Confederacy on 10 August 1763, and was killed in the battle.
