= Madhavrao II =

Peshwa of the Maratha Empire from 1774 to 1795

Shrimant Peshwa (Regent of the Empire) Madhavrao II
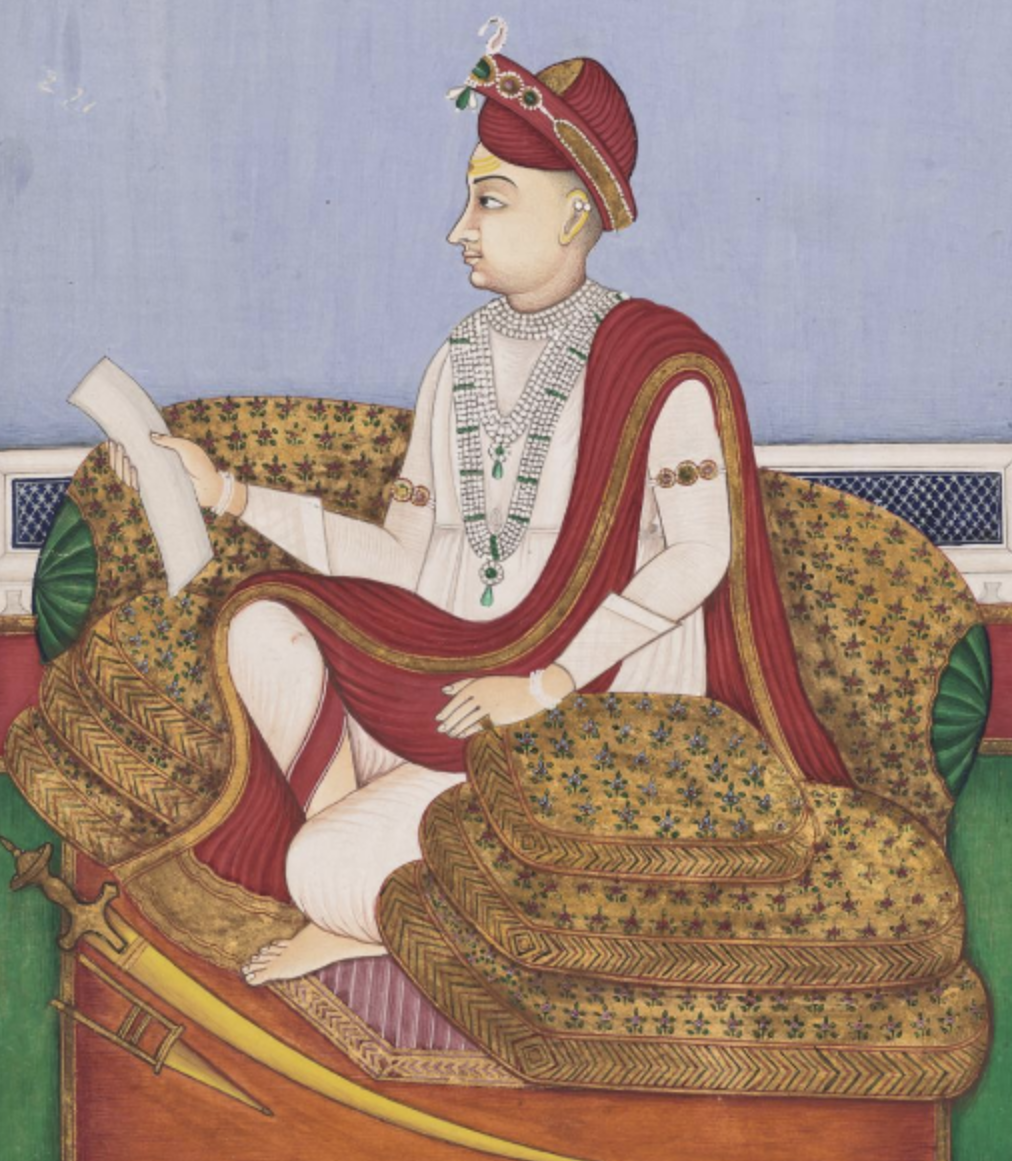
- Portrait of Madhavrao II c.1790–1792

12th Peshwa of the Maratha Empire
- In office 28 May 1774 – 27 October 1795
- Monarch: Rajaram II
- Preceded by: Raghunathrao
- Succeeded by: Baji Rao II

Personal details
- Born: 18 April 1774
- Died: 27 October 1795 (aged 21) Shaniwar Wada, Pune, Maratha Confederacy
- Parents: Narayanrao (father); Gangabai Sathe (mother)
- Relatives: Vishwasrao (uncle); Madhavrao I (uncle); Balaji Baji Rao (grandfather); Gopikabai (grandmother)

Madhavrao II (18 April 1774 – 27 October 1795), also known as Sawai Madhav Rao or Madhav Rao Narayan, was the 12th Peshwa of the Maratha Empire, ascending the throne during infancy. He was the posthumous son of Peshwa Narayanrao, who was murdered in 1773 on the orders of Narayanrao's uncle Raghunathrao. Despite his young age, Madhavrao II was recognized as the legal heir and installed as Peshwa following the Treaty of Salbai in 1782, after the conclusion of the First Anglo-Maratha War.

During his reign, the Maratha Confederacy was effectively administered by regents and influential generals, including the minister Nana Fadnavis, who maintained internal stability and oversaw military campaigns. Madhavrao II's rule marked a period of relative recovery and consolidation of Maratha power after the turbulence following the Third Battle of Panipat. He was also known for being a symbolic figurehead around whom the Maratha nobility rallied, despite his limited personal involvement in governance due to his early death at the age of 21.

== Early life ==
Madhavrao II (18 April 1774 – 27 October 1795), also known as Sawai Madhav Rao, was the posthumous son of Narayanrao and his wife Gangabai. Following Narayanrao's murder in 1773 by supporters of his uncle Raghunathrao, the infant Madhavrao II was declared Peshwa. However, Raghunathrao was soon deposed by Nana Fadnavis and eleven other influential administrators in a political coup known as the Baarbhaai Conspiracy ("Conspiracy of the Twelve"). Raghunathrao was tried and convicted by the justice Ram Shastri Prabhune and sentenced to death, though the sentence was never executed. Instead, the council installed Gangabai's newborn son, Madhavrao II, as Peshwa. The twelve administrators formed a governing council, the Bara Bhai, which conducted the affairs of the Maratha state in the name of the infant Peshwa, who was barely 40 days old at the time.

Madhavrao II's early life was marked by political instability, and his reign was largely dominated by the influence of Nana Fadnavis and the council. Though he held the title of Peshwa, real authority rested with the regents, who worked to maintain the unity of the Maratha Confederacy during his minority. He received traditional education in administration, military strategy, and literature, and was raised with a strong sense of loyalty to the Maratha state. His upbringing also emphasized balancing the interests of the powerful Maratha houses, such as the Shindes and Holkars, preparing him for leadership despite his limited early autonomy.

== Reign ==
=== First Anglo-Maratha War ===
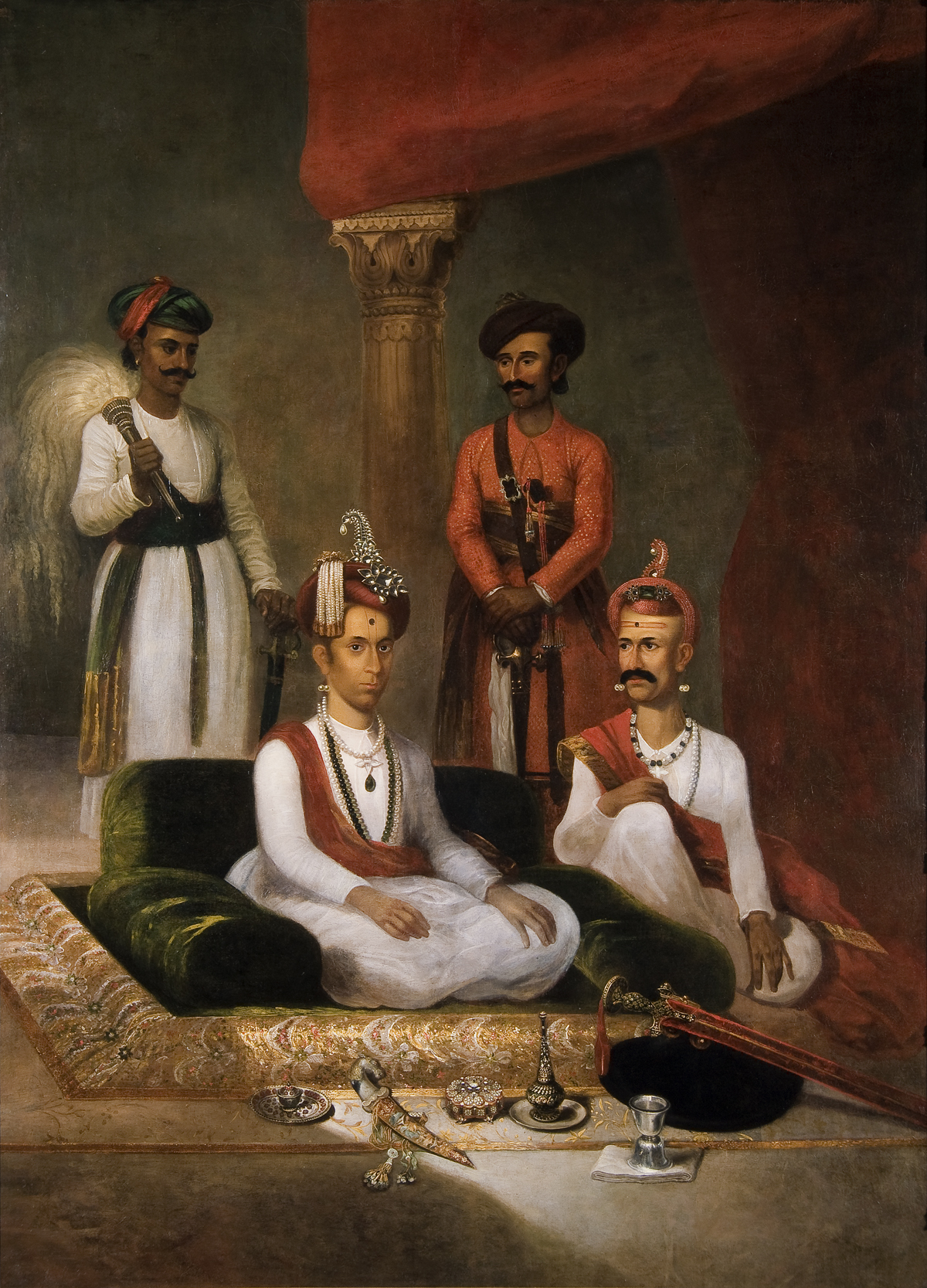
1792 portrait of Madhavrao II (left, seated) with Nana Fadnavis

After the inconclusive First Anglo-Maratha War, Mahadji Scindia secured recognition of Madhavrao II as the legitimate Peshwa by the British. Despite this formal acknowledgment, actual administrative and military authority remained largely in the hands of influential ministers such as Nana Fadnavis, Scindia, and other members of the Maratha council.

This arrangement was formalized through the Treaty of Salbai, signed on 17 May 1782. The treaty was subsequently ratified by Warren Hastings in June 1782 and by Nana Fadnavis in February 1783. The agreement effectively ended the First Anglo-Maratha War, restored the pre-war status quo, and established a period of relative peace between the Marathas and the British East India Company that lasted for approximately two decades.

=== Involvement in Anglo-Mysore Wars ===
Mysore had been a persistent threat to the Maratha Confederacy since 1761. To counter the military challenges posed by Mysore's rulers, Hyder Ali and later Tipu Sultan, the Peshwa of the Marathas allied with the British when necessary.

The Maratha–Mysore conflict reached its climax during the Battle of Gajendragad, fought from March 1786 to March 1787, in which Tipu Sultan was defeated by the Marathas. Following this victory, the Maratha frontier extended up to the Tungabhadra River.

The war formally ended with the Treaty of Gajendragad in April 1787. As per the treaty, Tipu Sultan agreed to pay a war indemnity of ₹4.8 million to the Marathas, along with an annual tribute of ₹1.2 million. He also agreed to return all territories previously captured by Hyder Ali and pay four years’ arrears of tribute owed to the Marathas.

Under the treaty, Tipu also agreed to release the Maratha officer Kalopant and return the territories of Adoni, Kittur, and Nargund to their former rulers, while Badami was ceded to the Marathas. In exchange, Tipu retained control over territories captured during the war, including Gajendragarh and Dharwar, and was granted the honorary title "Nabob Tipu Sultan, Fateh Ali Khan" by the Marathas.

The conclusion of the Maratha–Mysore War allowed Tipu Sultan to concentrate on his rivalry with the British. During the subsequent Third Anglo-Mysore War, the British East India Company became increasingly concerned about the military strength and territorial gains of the Maratha Confederacy across India.

=== Chaos in Delhi, Mughal Darbar ===
In 1788, Isma'il Beg, a Persian general in the Mughal army, led a large-scale revolt against the Marathas, which at the time dominated much of North India. Commanding a few hundred Mughal-Rohilla troops, Isma'il Beg's uprising was quickly suppressed by the armies of Mahadji Scindia. He was captured and executed, effectively ending the rebellion.

Following this, a Rohilla warlord named Ghulam Kadir, a descendant of the treacherous Najib-ud-Daualh and former ally of Isma'il Beg, seized control of Delhi, the Mughal capital. Ghulam Kadir deposed and brutally blinded the Mughal emperor Shah Alam II and installed a puppet ruler on the throne. He committed widespread atrocities against both the royal family and the populace, killing thousands and looting an estimated ₹22 crore.

Upon receiving news of the chaos in Delhi, Mahadji Scindia swiftly mobilized his forces. On 2 October 1788, he recaptured the city, punished Ghulam Kadir, who was tortured and executed, and restored Shah Alam II to the throne.

=== Subjugation of Rajputs ===
In 1790, Mahadji Scindia successfully brought several Rajput states under Maratha influence through victories at the Battle of Patan and the Battle of Merta. Following Mahadji Scindia's death in 1794, the effective control of the Maratha Confederacy shifted to Nana Fadnavis, who became the central figure in managing the empire's political and administrative affairs.

=== Defeat of Nizam ===
The Battle of Kharda was fought in February 1795 between the forces of the Nizam of Hyderabad, Asaf Jah II, and the Maratha Confederacy under Peshwa Madhavrao II. The Marathas achieved a decisive victory, and the Nizam suffered a humiliating defeat. Despite the Nizam being under British protection, Governor-General John Shore followed a policy of non-intervention, which caused a significant loss of trust between the Nizam and the British. The battle marked the last time that all major Maratha chieftains—Peshwa, Scindias, Holkars, and Gaekwads—fought together as a unified force.

=== Doji Bara famine ===
The oldest famine in the Deccan with sufficiently preserved local documentation for analytical study is the Doji Bara famine of 1791–1792. Relief measures were undertaken by the Peshwa, Madhavrao II, which included imposing restrictions on grain exports and importing large quantities of rice from Bengal through private trading networks. However, surviving evidence is often too limited to fully assess the actual effectiveness of these relief efforts during this period.

=== Personal interests ===
Madhavrao II was fond of the outdoors and maintained a private collection of animals, including lions and rhinoceroses. The area where he hunted later became the Peshwe Park zoo in Pune. He was particularly known to be attached to his herd of trained dancing deer.

== Death ==
Madhavrao II committed suicide at the age of 21 by jumping from the high walls of the Shaniwar Wada in Pune. The reasons behind his suicide are believed to include his inability to tolerate the highhandedness of Nana Fadnavis. Just before his death, it is said that Madhavrao, in ordering the execution of the despised police commissioner Ghashiram Kotwal, was able to defy Nana Fadnavis’ wishes for the first time.

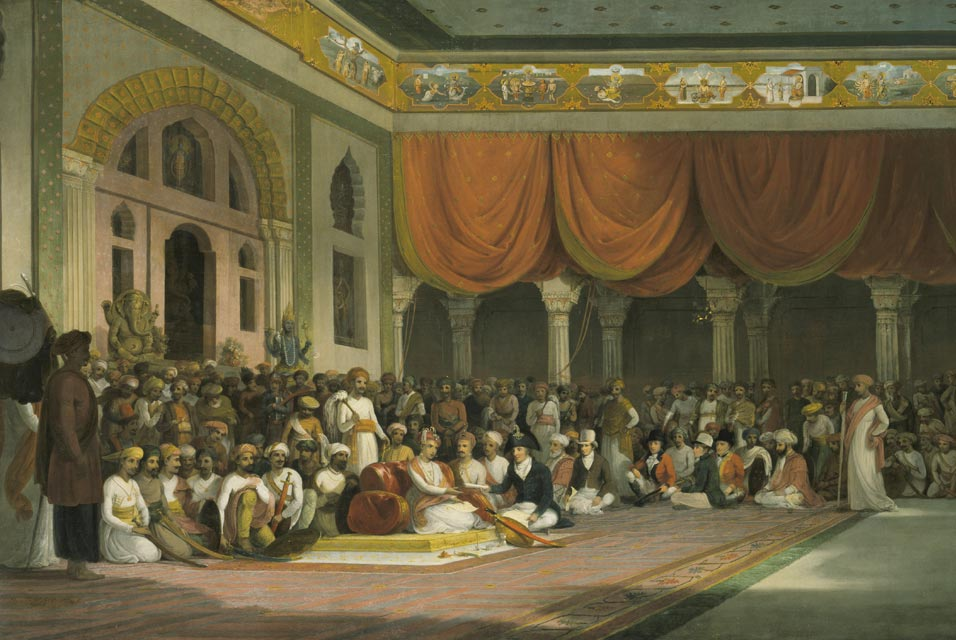
Representation of the delivery of the Ratified Treaty of 1790 by Sir Chas Warre Malet Bart to His Highness Soneae Peshwa, in full durbar or court as held upon that occasion at Poonah on 6 July 1790

== Succession ==
Madhavrao II died in 1795 without leaving an heir. Following his death, the Peshwa position was succeeded by Raghunathrao's son, Baji Rao II. The succession was orchestrated by the influential ministers of the Maratha Confederacy, particularly Nana Fadnavis, who sought to maintain stability and continue the council-based administration established during Madhavrao II's reign. Baji Rao II was relatively young at the time of his accession, which ensured that the real power remained largely in the hands of the Maratha ministers, continuing the precedent of ministerial control over the Peshwa's authority. This period also marked the consolidation of power by regional Maratha chieftains such as Scindias and the Holkars, who continued to play decisive roles in political and military affairs.

== See also ==
- Nana Fadnavis
- Mahadaji Pant Guruji
- Mahadaji Scindia
- Narayan Rao
