= Raghunath Rao =

Peshwa of the Maratha Confederacy from 1773 to 1774

Raghunathrao Bhat
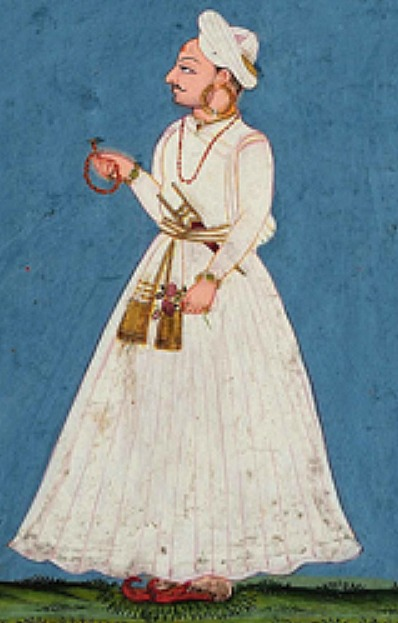
- Painting of Raghunath Rao by an unknown artist

11th Peshwa of the Maratha Empire
- In office 5 December 1773 – 28 May 1774
- Monarch: Rajaram II
- Preceded by: Narayanrao
- Succeeded by: Madhavrao II

Personal details
- Born: 18 August 1734 Satara, Satara State, Maratha Confederacy
- Died: 11 December 1783 (aged 49) Kopargaon, Maratha Confederacy
- Spouses: Janakibai; Anandibai; Latabai Ketkar
- Children: Bajirao II; Chimaji Rao II; Yesubai Ketkar; Amrut Rao
- Parents: Bajirao I (father); Kashibai (mother)
- Relatives: Balaji Baji Rao (brother)
- Profession: Peshwa

Military service
- Battles/wars
- Military career
- Branch: Maratha Army
- Rank: Peshwa
- Unit: Peshwa's Cavalry
- Conflicts: See list: Afghan–Maratha War; Battle of Delhi (1757); Battle of Attock (1758); Capture of Peshawar (1758); Battle of Lahore (1759); Battle of Multan (1759); Battle of Dera Gazi (1759); Against Rajputs; Battle of Gwalior (1754); Siege of Barwara (1757); Against Jats; Battle of Kumher (1754); Against Nizam; Battle of Uruli (1762); Battle of Alegaon (1762); Battle of Rakshasbhuvan (1763); Maratha–Mysore Wars; Siege of Sira (1767); Alliance with the British; First Anglo-Maratha War (1775-82); Battle of Wadgaon (1779)

Raghunathrao (18 August 1734 – 11 December 1783), also known as Ragho Ballal or Raghoba Dada, was the younger son of Peshwa Bajirao I who served as the 11th Peshwa of the Maratha Empire for a brief period from 1773 to 1774.

The army led by him defeated the Rohillas at the Battle of Delhi (1757), resulting in the Marathas becoming the de facto rulers of Delhi, with the Mughal Emperor Alamgir II retaining only nominal authority. He also led successful campaigns against the Durrani Empire at Sirhind and Attock, bringing northwestern India and parts of present-day Pakistan—mainly Punjab up to Peshawar—under Maratha rule (1758–59) for a brief period.

Ahmad Shah Durrani later sought revenge against the Marathas for capturing Punjab and defeating the Durrani armies. He began preparing for another campaign in India. Raghunathrao requested substantial financial assistance to check Abdali's advance, which was refused by Peshwa Balaji Baji Rao. Balaji Baji Rao's decision not to send Raghunathrao as the main commander of the Maratha armies against Ahmad Shah Abdali—along with other factors—ultimately culminated in the defeat at Panipat in 1761.

After the death of Balaji Baji Rao, his son Madhavrao I became the new Peshwa under the regency of Raghunathrao. The untimely death of Madhavrao I created a vacuum in the Peshwa position. Raghunathrao aspired to become Peshwa himself but was opposed by many Maratha nobles who viewed Madhavrao I's younger brother, Narayanrao, as the legitimate successor. Seeking to seize power, Raghunathrao was involved in the assassination of his nephew Peshwa Narayanrao in 1773.

However, his reign was short-lived, as Narayanrao's infant son Madhavrao II was recognized as the legitimate Peshwa by the Maratha nobles in 1774. After being deposed, Raghunathrao allied with the East India Company during the First Anglo-Maratha War, attempting to regain power. The attempt failed when the Marathas defeated the Company forces.

Raghunathrao later withdrew from active politics and died of unknown causes in 1783 at Kopargaon.

== Early life ==
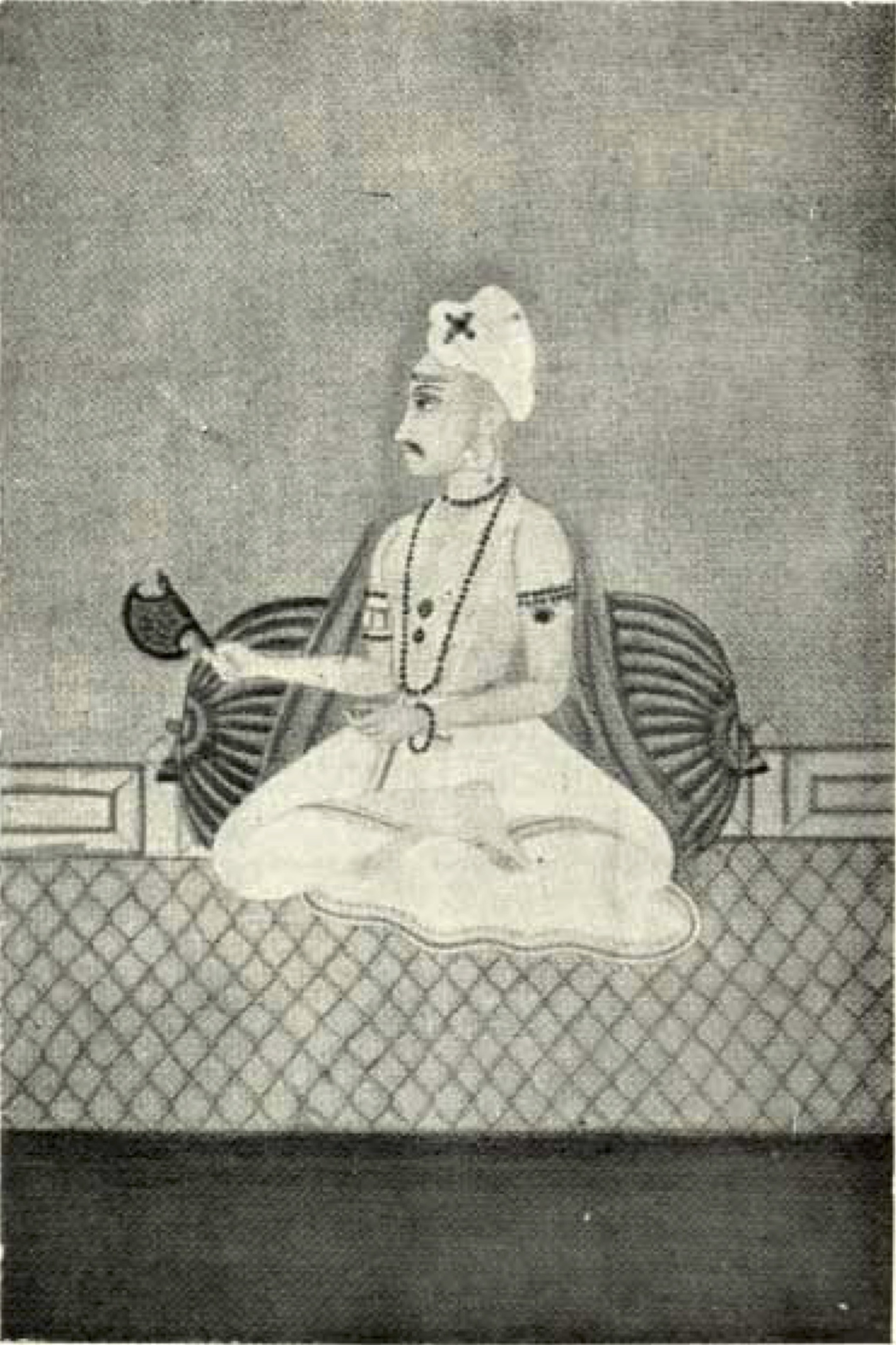
Painting of Raghunath Rao (Raghunathrao) seated leaning against a bolster, c. 18th-century

Raghunathrao Bhat, also known as "Raghoba", "Raghoba Dada" and "Ragho Bharari", was the younger brother of Balaji Baji Rao. He was born in a Marathi Bramhin family to Peshwa Bajirao I and Kashibai. He was born in Mahuli near Satara on 8 December 1734. Much of his early childhood was spent in Satara. Shortly after his birth, his stepmother Mastani gave birth to his half-brother Krishna Rao, later known as Shamsher Bahadur I.

Raghunathrao was born into the Bhat family of Chitpavan Brahmin origin, which held the hereditary office of the Peshwa in the Maratha Empire. During his early years, the Maratha Empire was at the height of its territorial expansion under the leadership of his father Bajirao I and grandfather Balaji Vishwanath. Growing up in this political environment, Raghunathrao was exposed to administrative affairs, military organization, and statecraft from an early age.

He received an education in Sanskrit, Marathi and Persian, and was trained in horseback riding, swordsmanship, and the use of traditional Maratha weapons. Contemporary accounts describe him as intelligent, energetic, and ambitious. His enthusiasm for warfare and quick decision-making on the battlefield earned him the nickname "Ragho Bharari" (literally, "Ragho the Charger") due to his preference for rapid cavalry movements.

In his youth, Raghunathrao assisted his elder brother Peshwa Balaji Baji Rao in various administrative and military responsibilities. Over time, however, differences in political and military judgment developed between the two brothers, which later contributed to factional divisions within the Peshwa administration. Despite these differences, Raghunathrao remained an influential figure within the Maratha polity and played an active role in several important military campaigns during the mid-18th century.

== First Northern Expedition (1753–1755) ==
In his early years, Raghunathrao led successful military campaigns in northern Indian subcontinent. His expedition between 1753 and 1755 was concluded by an advantageous treaty with the Jat rulers of Bharatpur, which secured Maratha influence in parts of the Doab region and strengthened their position in the north.

During this period, Raghunathrao allied with Imad-ul-Mulk, the powerful Mughal vizier, in a bid to assert Maratha authority over the Mughal Empire. With Maratha support, Imad-ul-Mulk deposed Ahmad Shah Bahadur in 1754, who was subsequently imprisoned along with his mother. The Mughal throne was then offered to Alamgir II, who ruled as a puppet monarch under the influence of the Marathas and Imad-ul-Mulk. This intervention made the Marathas the de facto power in Delhi for several years.

Raghunathrao’s northern campaign extended Maratha control over several key territories and forts in Doab and the Delhi Subah, consolidating their presence in the region. However, despite these military gains, the expedition did not yield significant economic benefits for the Maratha treasury. The cost of maintaining garrisons and managing distant territories proved burdensome, and internal political divisions within the Maratha leadership limited the long-term success of these operations.

== Second Northern Expedition (1757–1758) ==
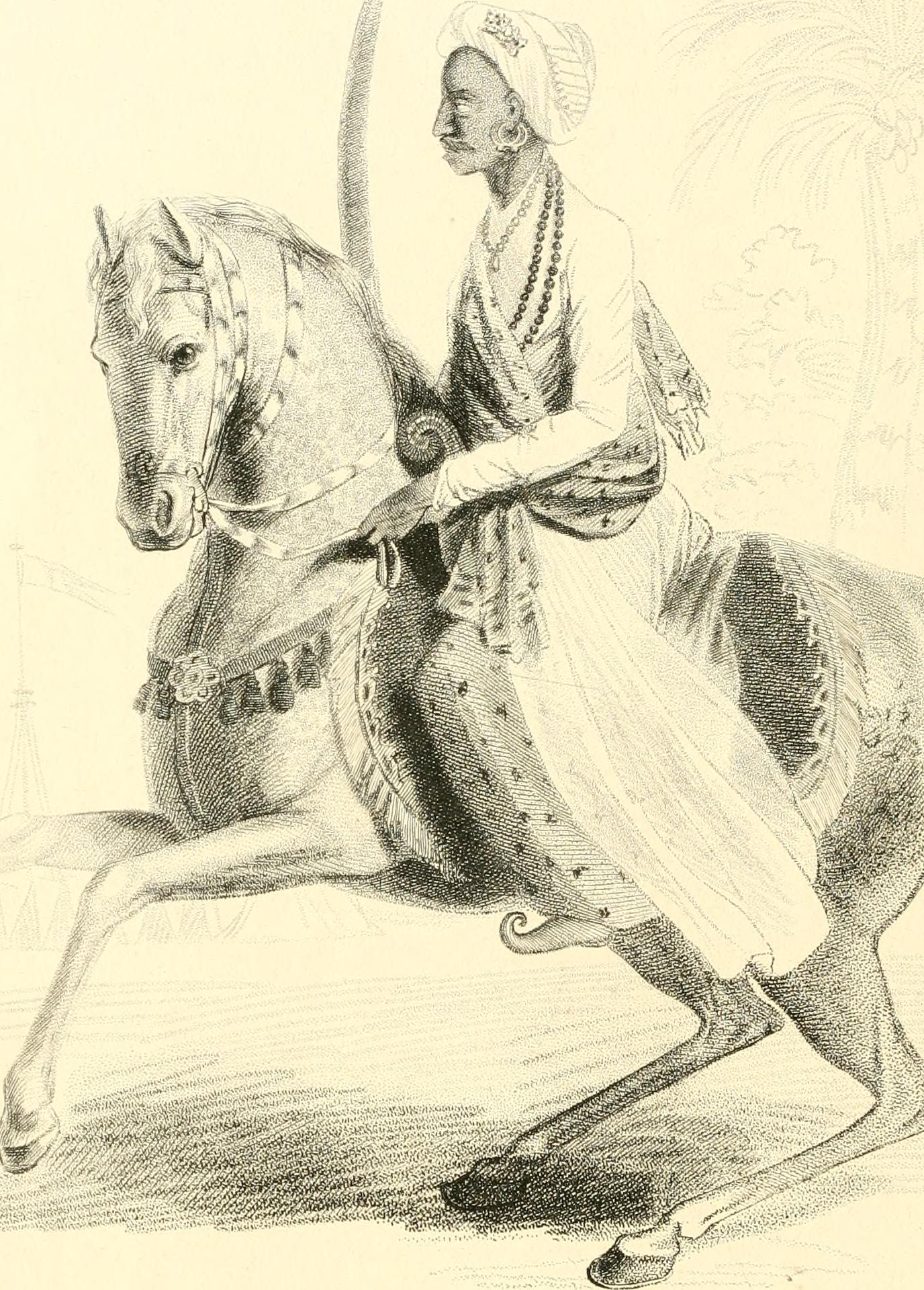
Raghunath Rao on horseback

At the end of 1756, Ahmad Shah Abdali began preparations for another invasion of the Indian subcontinent and a march toward Delhi. In response, Peshwa Balaji Baji Rao directed his brother Raghunathrao, along with Malharrao Holkar, Dattaji Shinde and Sidojiraje Gharge-Desai-Dehmukh, to organize a northern expedition aimed at repelling the Afghan advance. The Marathas, as protectors of the Mughal Emperor, sought to restore stability in the north and defend imperial authority from Durrani incursions.

Balaji Baji Rao appointed Raghunathrao as the chief commander of this campaign, with Malharrao Holkar assigned to assist him in leading the Maratha forces. Their objective was to strengthen Maratha influence in the Doab and Punjab regions, secure Delhi from Afghan control, and ensure that the Mughal court remained under Maratha protection.

Malharrao Holkar departed for Indore at the end of 1756 to assemble his cavalry and logistical support. Raghunathrao followed a few weeks later, setting out from Pune in October 1756 with the Maratha army. His march northward was methodical, gathering local allies and reinforcements along the route through Malwa and Bundelkhand. The campaign marked the beginning of the Marathas’ final push to reassert dominance in the northern territories before the events leading to Panipat unfolded a few years later.

=== Maratha affairs in Rajputana (February 1757 - July 1757) ===
Raghunathrao reached Indore on 14 February 1757, accompanied by Santajirao Wable, where he was joined by Malharrao Holkar. The objectives of Raghunathrao’s northern expedition were twofold: first, to defend the Mughal Emperor from the advancing Afghan forces, and second, to collect outstanding taxes and tributes from northern states to meet the Peshwa's growing financial obligations.

In mid-May 1757, Raghunathrao dispatched an advance force of 20,000 troops into the Ganga–Yamuna Doab region to recover territories previously held by the Marathas. Meanwhile, with Malharrao Holkar and the remaining army, he turned toward Rajputana to levy contributions from local rulers. However, the fortified nature of Rajput strongholds and the martial resistance of the local population made revenue collection difficult. Raghunathrao repeatedly wrote to the Peshwa in Pune requesting funds to sustain his forces, stating:

I am feeding myself only by looting villages. In this country most places are fortified, and not a grain of food can be obtained without fighting. I have no money, and cannot even raise a loan. My soldiers have been fasting for one or two days at a time.

— Raghunathrao's letter to Peshwa

Advancing through Mewar, the Maratha army extracted a ransom of ₹1 lakh from Jawad and attacked Ranikheda in March 1757. Reaching Jaipur in April, Raghunathrao demanded pending payments from Madho Singh, the ruler of Jaipur, and laid siege to Barwada, a fort held by the Shekhawat clan. The Marathas lacked adequate siege equipment, and the prolonged blockade strained their resources. Kaniram, Jaipur’s chief minister, offered payments as per previous agreements with the Marathas, but Raghunathrao insisted on a higher tribute, demanding ₹40–50 lakhs and territory valued at ₹14 lakhs. Madho Singh rejected these terms and instructed his feudatories to fortify their estates and remain on alert.

By July 1757, realizing that his army lacked the strength to capture the forts of Barwada or Jaipur, Raghunathrao agreed to negotiate. A settlement was reached on 12 July 1757, under which Jaipur paid ₹11 lakhs, six of which were paid immediately. On the same day, Raghunathrao wrote again to the Peshwa, noting:

I have no money, nor is any loan available. My troops are in debt. Prices here are very high. I am daily getting my food only by sacking the villages.

— Raghunathrao's letter to Peshwa on 12 July 1757

Despite his repeated appeals, no financial assistance arrived from Pune. Having concluded operations in Rajputana, Raghunathrao and Malharrao Holkar marched toward Delhi at the end of July 1757 to expel Afghan garrisons and reassert Maratha control over the Mughal capital. By this time, Ahmad Shah Abdali had already withdrawn to Afghanistan following his invasion of northern Indian subcontinent.

=== Marathas enter the Ganga Doab (May 1757 - July 1757) ===
The Maratha forces dispatched by Raghunathrao to recover lost territories in Ganga Doab were commanded by Sakharam Bapu, Vithal Shivdev, Tatya Gangadhar, and Antaji Mankeshwar. They reached Agra in May 1757, where the Marathas negotiated peace with Suraj Mal before advancing toward the Yamuna. Crossing the river at Agra, the Marathas captured Etawah and Sikandra and established a camp at Kasganj on the southern bank of the Ganges on 17 June 1757.

On 2 July 1757, Antaji Mankeshwar advanced toward Anupshahr. The town of Meerut, then held by agents of Najib Khan, resisted the Marathas but was quickly subdued. Imad-ul-Mulk sent his diwan, Nagar Mal, to Anupshahr to renew friendly relations with the Marathas. Meanwhile, Shuja-ud-daulah agreed to remain neutral in the conflict between Najib ad-Dawlah and the Marathas. As a result, most of the Ganga Doab was cleared of Najib’s agents and came under Maratha control.

=== Battle of Delhi (July 1757 - September 1757) ===
Before returning to Afghanistan, Ahmad Shah Abdali retained Alamgir II on the Mughal throne, appointing Imad-ul-Mulk as his wazir. However, Abdali vested real authority in Najib-ud-Daulah, his chief agent in India, and appointed him Mir Bakhshi. Both Alamgir II and Imad-ul-Mulk sought to free themselves from Najib Khan’s dominance and requested Maratha assistance to liberate Delhi from Afghan influence.

Raghunathrao agreed and marched towards Delhi in July 1757. Meanwhile, Sakharam Bapu, already present in the Doab region, occupied Patparganj, and Shamsher Bahadur, commanding the artillery division, reached Rewari on 27 July 1757. Grain supplies were blocked from entering Delhi. In preparation for the impending battle, Najib Khan dug trenches at Khizrabad outside the city to hinder the advance of the Maratha cavalry. Upon learning of Raghunathrao’s approach, Najib Khan sent his wakil, Meghraj, to Imad-ul-Mulk to negotiate terms of peace. Imad, however, proposed humiliating conditions unacceptable to Najib, leaving war as the only viable solution.

==== Raghunathrao reaches Delhi and the attack begins (August 1757 – September 1757) ====
Raghunathrao reached Khizrabad on 11 August 1757 with his lieutenants, where he was joined by Sakharam Bapu, who had crossed over from the Doab. He dispatched two Maratha divisions to attack Delhi. The first division advanced through Lal Darwaza and captured the old city after defeating Najib Khan's troops under Bakhtawar Khan. The second division attacked from the south-east, where Qutb Shah, commanding 2,500 troops, fired bombardments on the Maratha soldiers from the Blue Bastion. Upon realizing that the old city had fallen, Najib Khan and Qutb Shah retreated to the inner city with their Rohilla forces. In retaliation, the Rohillas plundered Imad-ul-Mulk's house in Delhi and dishonored the women in his harem. Imad-ul-Mulk subsequently met with Raghunathrao and formalized an alliance with the Marathas.

Unable to storm the fort from the south, Raghunathrao decided to encircle it and lay siege from all sides. Grain supplies to the fort were cut off, and Maratha troops surrounded it. Najib Khan responded by placing guards and cannons on all sides, preventing the Marathas from approaching within effective range.

Malharrao Holkar and Vithal Shivdev led Maratha forces to attack the fort from the northern side near Kashmir Gate, supported by Imad-ul-Mulk's troops under Bahadur Khan Baluch and Jamil-ud-din Khan. Meanwhile, Santajirao Wable and Manaji Paygude entrenched opposite Kabul Gate in the north-western section of the fort. On 25 August 1757, Bahadur Khan and Nagar Mal attacked the outskirts of the fort, forcing the Rohilla defenders to retreat inside. Najib Khan positioned long-range cannons on the northern section of the fort and commenced bombardment, resulting in the deaths of several hundred of Bahadur Khan's troops. The fighting subsequently paused.

With his forces reduced to around 2,000 men, Najib Khan attempted to negotiate through his wakil, Meghraj. Raghunathrao’s terms required Najib to resign as Mir Bakhshi, vacate the fort with his troops, withdraw to his Rohilla jagirs, and pay an indemnity of ₹50 to 60 lakhs. Najib Khan refused, considering the terms humiliating and excessive, and prepared to continue the defense of the fort.

==== Peace talks crumble and battle resumes (30 August 1757 – 1 September 1757) ====
The battle resumed on the night of 29 August 1757, when Raghunathrao attacked the Delhi Gate from the south, while Imad-ul-Mulk assaulted the Lahore Gate in the north-west. The fort was bombarded by Maratha cannons from multiple directions, resulting in the demolition of two bastions of Delhi Gate. The cannonade continued until 31 August 1757. Najib Khan's soldiers attempted a counterattack, driving back the forces of Imad-ul-Mulk and Ahmad Khan Bangash from Lahore Gate. Another sortie at Turkman Gate was also executed by Najib’s troops, during which Dilel Singh, the diwan of Wazir, suffered casualties.

==== Najib-ud-daulah surrenders and agrees for peace talks (September 1757) ====
With famine affecting the city, many of Najib Khan's soldiers began deserting, leaving only a small contingent loyal to him. Outnumbered and facing inevitable defeat, Najib recognized that surrender was the only option. Malharrao Holkar persuaded Raghunathrao and Imad-ul-Mulk to agree to peace, while Abdul Ahad Khan urged Najib to accept the terms. On 3 September 1757, Qutb Shah and Najib Khan visited Malharrao's camp at Qudsiabad and accepted the surrender conditions. This created some tension between Malharrao and Raghunathrao, as Raghunathrao commanded the northern expedition, but the peace negotiations were conducted by Malharrao.

The terms of peace were implemented on 6 September 1757. Najib vacated his position along with his Rohilla soldiers and their belongings and encamped at Wazirabad. Raghunathrao released all Rohilla prisoners, while grain was brought in from ferries to supply the starving city. Maratha troops were stationed to maintain order, and Imad-ul-Mulk replaced Najib's agents with his own officials in key positions. Ahmad Shah Bangash was appointed imperial Paymaster-General. As a result, Delhi was effectively freed from Rohilla and Afghan influence by the combined efforts of the wazir and the Marathas.

On 22 October 1757, Raghunathrao and Malharrao Holkar departed Delhi after celebrating the Dussehra festival and entered the Doab region. Raghunathrao proceeded to Garh Mukteshwar to perform ritual bathing, while Malharrao Holkar conducted raids in Saharanpur district, part of Najib Khan's former jagir. Najib, along with his Afghan forces, retreated to his interior territories. Subsequently, Raghunathrao and Malharrao withdrew from Doab, leaving its administration to Imad-ul-Mulk, and began preparations for the Punjab campaign aimed at liberating the province from the Durrani Empire.

=== Maratha Invasion of Punjab (October 1757 – May 1758) ===
==== Siege of Sirhind (February 1758 – March 1758) ====
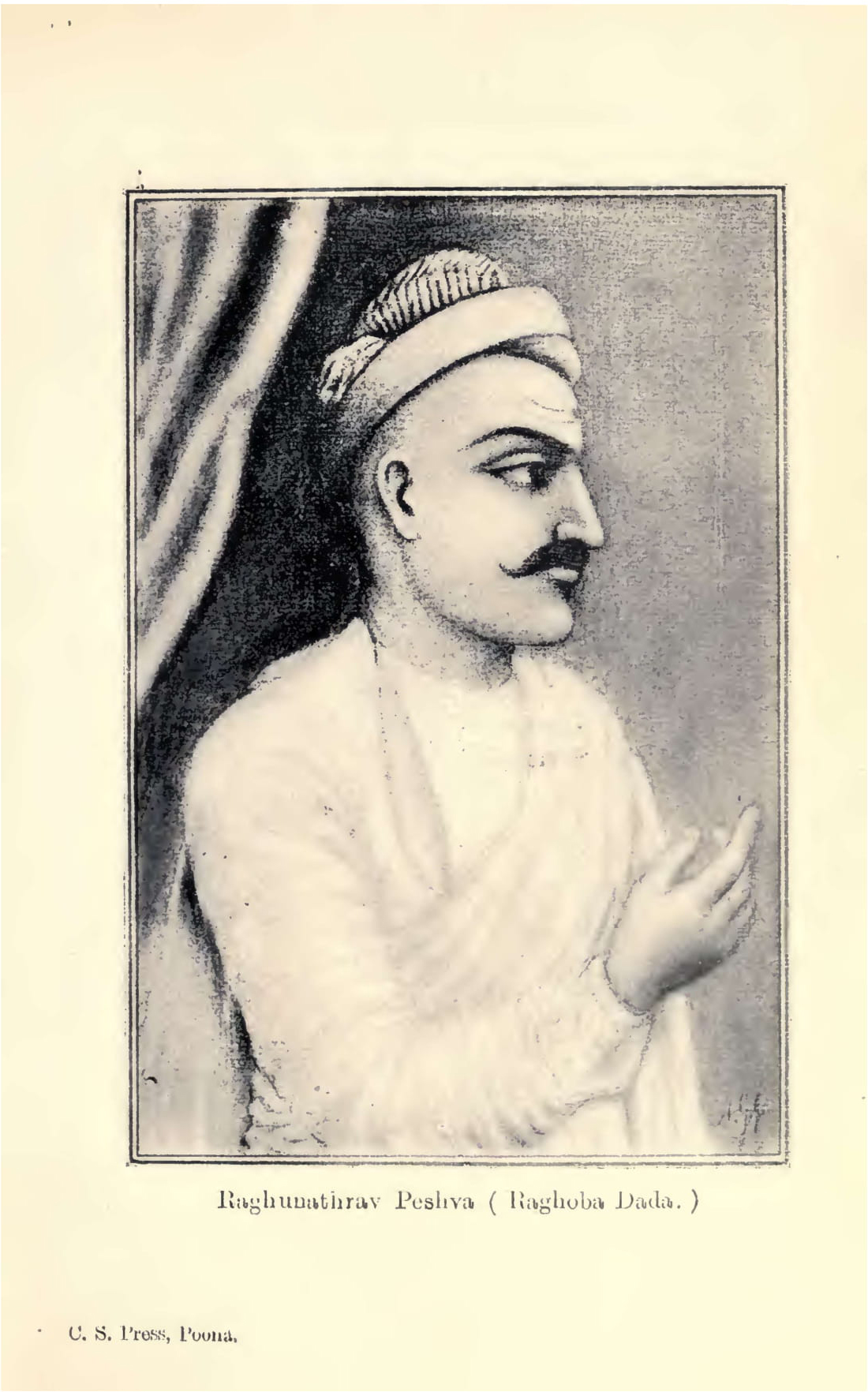
Posthumous portrait of Raghunathrao

Ahmad Shah Durrani of present-day Afghanistan had annexed the province of Punjab from the Mughal Empire during his 1757 invasion. He appointed his son, Timur Shah, as the governor of the province. Timur Shah began consolidating his position in Punjab by sending Sarfaraz Khan to subdue Adina Beg, the Mughal governor of the region. Although Adina Beg successfully repelled Sarfaraz Khan's advance, he recognized the vulnerability of his position, as he commanded only 10,000 troops. Consequently, he entered into negotiations with Raghunathrao, who was then in Delhi, agreeing to pay ₹1 lakh for each day of the Maratha march and half a lakh for each day of halt.

In response, Abdus Samad Khan Muhammadzai of Sirhind, a close ally of Ahmad Shah Durrani, marched to Thaneshwar in October 1757, joined by the son of Najib-ud-Daulah. Raghunathrao and Malharrao Holkar avoided direct confrontation and temporarily circled around Delhi. In December 1757, Malharrao laid siege to Kunjpura and raided territories stretching from Delhi to Thaneshwar. Abdus Samad Khan, then on an expedition against Ala Singh, was alarmed by the Maratha advance. He quickly concluded his campaign and returned to Sirhind Fort on 12 January 1758 to prepare defenses. Malharrao, however, did not engage directly and withdrew from Kunjpura after extracting a tribute of ₹5 lakhs.

Raghunathrao entered Punjab in February 1758, accompanied by Mallharrao Holkar, Dattaji Shinde, Jankoji Shinde, and Shamsher Bahadur I. He laid siege to Sirhind Fort, joined by Adina Beg's forces and Sikh mercenaries. Maratha raiding parties spread across the district to plunder surrounding villages. The siege lasted for several days, and on 21 March 1758, Abdus Samad Khan, along with Jangbaz Khan and other Afghan commanders, were captured while attempting to escape, though they were treated respectfully by Raghunathrao. This resulted in the Marathas capturing Sirhind. Subsequently, the combined forces of the Marathas and Adina Beg advanced toward Lahore to liberate it from Afghan control.

==== Siege of Lahore (April 1758) ====
Timur Shah's position at Lahore was precarious. Ahmad Shah Durrani was occupied in Khurasan suppressing a rebellion, the Lahore Fort was in a state of disrepair, and the region was largely hostile due to the Sikh population. Additionally, Timur Shah commanded a relatively small force, making the defense of Lahore untenable. Consequently, he decided to retreat in the face of the Maratha advance. On 19 April 1758, Timur Shah crossed the Ravi River with his troops and supplies, abandoning Lahore.

When the Marathas and their Mughal allies arrived, they captured Lahore Fort without resistance. Pursuing Timur Shah and his forces, the Marathas first crossed the Ravi River and defeated the rear guard commanded by Mir Hazar Khan. Alarmed at the prospect of being captured, Timur Shah crossed the Chenab River with his core Durrani clansmen, leaving behind the majority of his troops and supplies, which were seized by the Marathas and Mughal forces. Subsequently, the Marathas extended their control by capturing Attock, Multan, Rohtas Fort, Dera Ghazi Khan, and Peshawar.

Raghunathrao highlighted these achievements in a letter to the Peshwa:

We have already brought Lahore, Multan, Kashmir and other subahs on this side of Attock under our rule for the most part... Ahmad Khan Abdali's son, Timur Sultan, and Jahan Khan, have been pursued by our troops, and their forces completely routed. Both of them have now reached Peshawar with a few broken troops... we have decided to establish our rule up to Kandahar. – Raghunathrao, Letter to the Peshwa

On 15 September 1758, only a few months after the Maratha victory, Adani Beg died at Khanpur near Hoshiarpur. Following his death, the Marathas appointed Dattaji Scindia and later Sabaji Shinde as governors of Punjab.

In 1760, Ahmad Shah Durrani’s forces defeated and killed Dattaji Scindia at the Battle of Barari Ghat near modern-day Delhi. In response, Raghunathrao was instructed to lead a northern campaign. He requested substantial military and financial support, noting that the death of Adina Beg had left them without a key ally. However, his request was denied by Sadashivrao Bhau, his cousin and the Diwan of the Peshwa. As a result, Raghunathrao declined to march north, and Sadashivrao Bhau was appointed commander-in-chief of the Maratha Army, under whom the Third Battle of Panipat was later fought.

== Regency ==
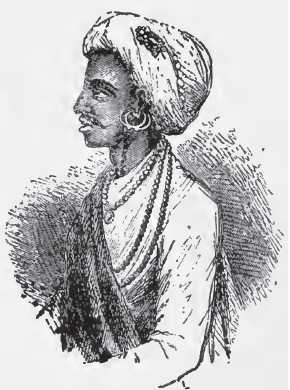
Raghunathrao

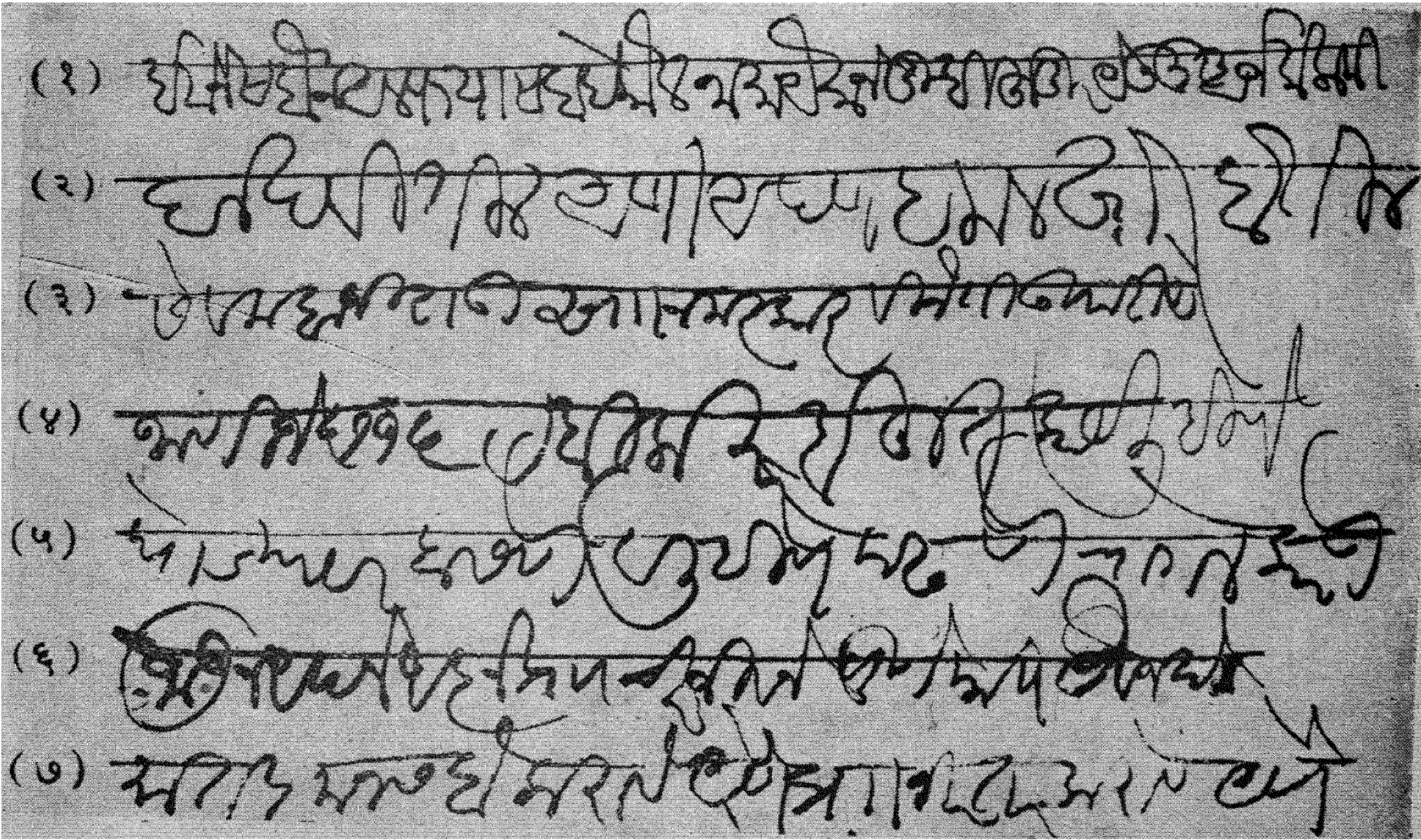
Handwriting of Raghunathrao (7th line)

After the Maratha defeat at the Third Battle of Panipat in 1761, and the deaths of his brother Balaji Baji Rao and half-brother Shamsher Bahadur I, the Peshwa title passed to Madhavrao I, the second son of Nanasaheb. As Madhavrao was a minor at the time, Raghunathrao was appointed regent of the young Peshwa.

Raghunathrao soon fell out of favor with Madhavrao and conspired against him by allying with the Nizam of Hyderabad. This alliance was defeated at Ghodegaon, and Raghunathrao was placed under house arrest. After Madhavrao's death in 1772, he was released and became regent for Madhavrao's younger brother, Narayanrao. Together with his wife Anandibai, Raghunathrao orchestrated the murder of Narayanrao.

Legend holds that a written order originally read "Hyala Dharaava" (“Have him seized”), but Anandibai altered it to "Hyala Maraava" (“Have him killed”). When the assassins attacked, Narayanrao reportedly ran outside, crying “Kaakaa, malaa waachwaa” (“Uncle, save me”), but Raghunathrao did not intervene, and Narayanrao was killed. Raghunathrao assumed the Peshwa position, but he was soon overthrown by Nana Fadnavis and eleven other administrators in the “Baarbhaai Conspiracy” (Conspiracy of the Twelve). He was tried, convicted, and sentenced to death by Ram Shastri Prabhune, though the sentence was never executed.

In 1774, the first battle between Raghunathrao and the Baarbhai took place at Kasegaon near Pandharpur. He then moved to Khambhat seeking assistance from the British, who did not support him militarily but transported him to Surat.

At Surat, Raghunathrao signed a treaty with the British East India Company on 6 March 1775, under which Thane, Vasai, and Sashti were to be handed over to the Company, and the Company would assist Raghunathrao in claiming the Peshwa position.

However, the Company was not yet prepared for war, and after the Treaty of Purandar (1776), openly distanced themselves from Raghunathrao, asking him to live as a pensioner. Fearful of the Baarbhai, he remained in Surat, where the Company allowed him to stay.

In 1776, Raghunathrao unsuccessfully sought assistance from the Portuguese and subsequently moved to Bombay, where the Company provided him ₹15,000. During this period, the East India Company suffered defeat at the Battle of Talegaon. Following this, a treaty was signed at Vadgaon, in which Raghunathrao’s claim to the Peshwa position was formally rescinded.

== Assassination of Peshwa Narayanrao ==
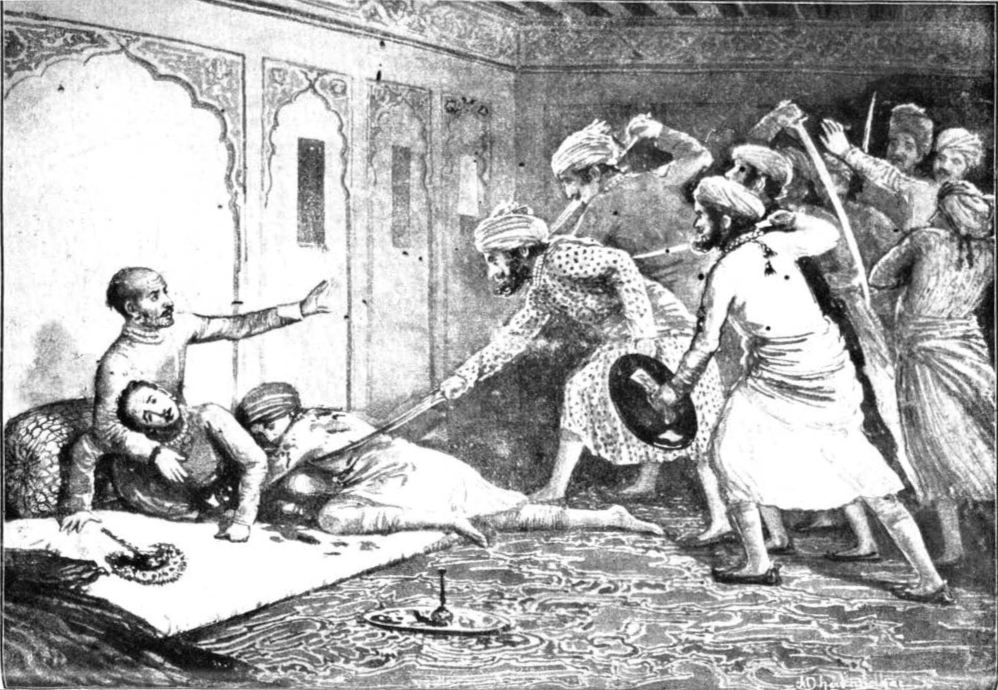
Assassination of Narayanrao

On 30 August 1773, Peshwa Narayanrao was assassinated by his uncle Raghunathrao and Raghunathrao's wife, Anandibai. As Raghunathrao was confined and could not directly orchestrate the act, the preparations were carried out by Tujali Pawar, an influential personal servant.

Tujali Pawar reportedly held personal grievances against Narayanrao and possibly Madhavrao, and whether or not these perceived offenses were justified, they motivated him to play a central role in the plot. While the original plan had been to capture Narayanrao, it was later amended to involve murder. This revised plan relied, in part, on the assumption that Sakharam Bapu would remain neutral regarding the conspiracy.

=== Legal consequences ===
Ram Shastri, the Nyayadhish ("Chief Justice") of the Maratha Empire, began investigating the assassination of Narayanrao immediately after the incident, despite Raghunathrao's opposition. The investigation lasted approximately six weeks and was conducted in accordance with established judicial practices.

Shastri concluded that Raghunathrao was the main culprit and identified about fifty additional individuals as being more or less responsible for the murder (forty-nine men and one female servant). Among the forty-nine men, thirteen were Gardis (eight Hindus and five Muslims), twenty-six were Brahmins, three were Prabhus, and seven were Marathas. The twenty-six Brahmins primarily served as clerks who acted as agents in planning and executing the details of the conspiracy. Vyankatrao Kashi, his brother Laxman, and Sakharam Hari Gupte were the three Prabhus identified as having played prominent roles in the plot.

When Shastri confronted Raghunathrao, the latter attempted to downplay the murder as a private matter and urged Shastri not to concern himself with it. Shastri, however, fearlessly declared Raghunathrao the main culprit in the murder of his nephew, demonstrating the power of an independent judiciary in a well-governed state. Despite his principled stance, Shastri was subsequently dismissed from his office by Raghunathrao. Shastri returned to his native village.

==== Barabhai Council ====
While Shastri was conducting the investigation, Sakharam Bapu took measures to ensure the safety of the pregnant Gangabai, the widow of Narayanrao. Her unborn child would determine the succession: if she gave birth to a male, he would become the heir to the Peshwa throne; if female, Sakharam Bapu considered installing Ali Bahadur, the grandson of Baji Rao I, as Peshwa of the Maratha Empire.

To secure this outcome, Sakharam Bapu persuaded many Maratha chiefs from Raghunathrao's camp to switch allegiance without raising his suspicion. He subsequently laid the foundations of a council of twelve influential Maratha officials and chiefs, collectively known as the Barabhai Council ("Twelve Comrades"). Key members of this council included Nana Fadnavis, Haripant Fadnavis, Babuji Naik, Maloji Ghorpade, Bhavanrao Pratinidhi, the Raste and Patwardhan families, along with Mahadji Shinde and Tukoji Holkar.

== Death and aftermath ==
Raghunathrao moved to Kopargaon to reside with his trusted Sardar, Santajirao Wable, and died there on 11 December 1783 of unknown causes. He had two sons, Baji Rao II and Chimaji Rao II, and had also adopted Amrut Rao. After his death, his wife Anandibai and his three sons were kept in confinement by the Peshwa's minister Nana Fadnavis. Following the death of Peshwa Madhavrao II, Nana Fadnavis, together with the influential chief Daulat Rao Scindia, installed Chimaji Rao and Baji Rao II as puppet Peshwas in quick succession.

== In popular culture ==
- In the 1994 Hindi TV series The Great Maratha, Raghoba's character was portrayed by Bhushan Jeevan.
- In the 2014 Indian Marathi-language film, Rama Madhav, he is portrayed by Prasad Oak.
- In 2019 Hindi film Panipat, he was portrayed by Kashyap Parulekar.

== See also ==
- Battle of Attock
- Javji Bamble

Preceded by Narayanrao	Peshwa; 1773–1774	Succeeded by Madhavarao Narayan
