= Nana Fadnavis =

Historical Indian statesman (1742–1800)

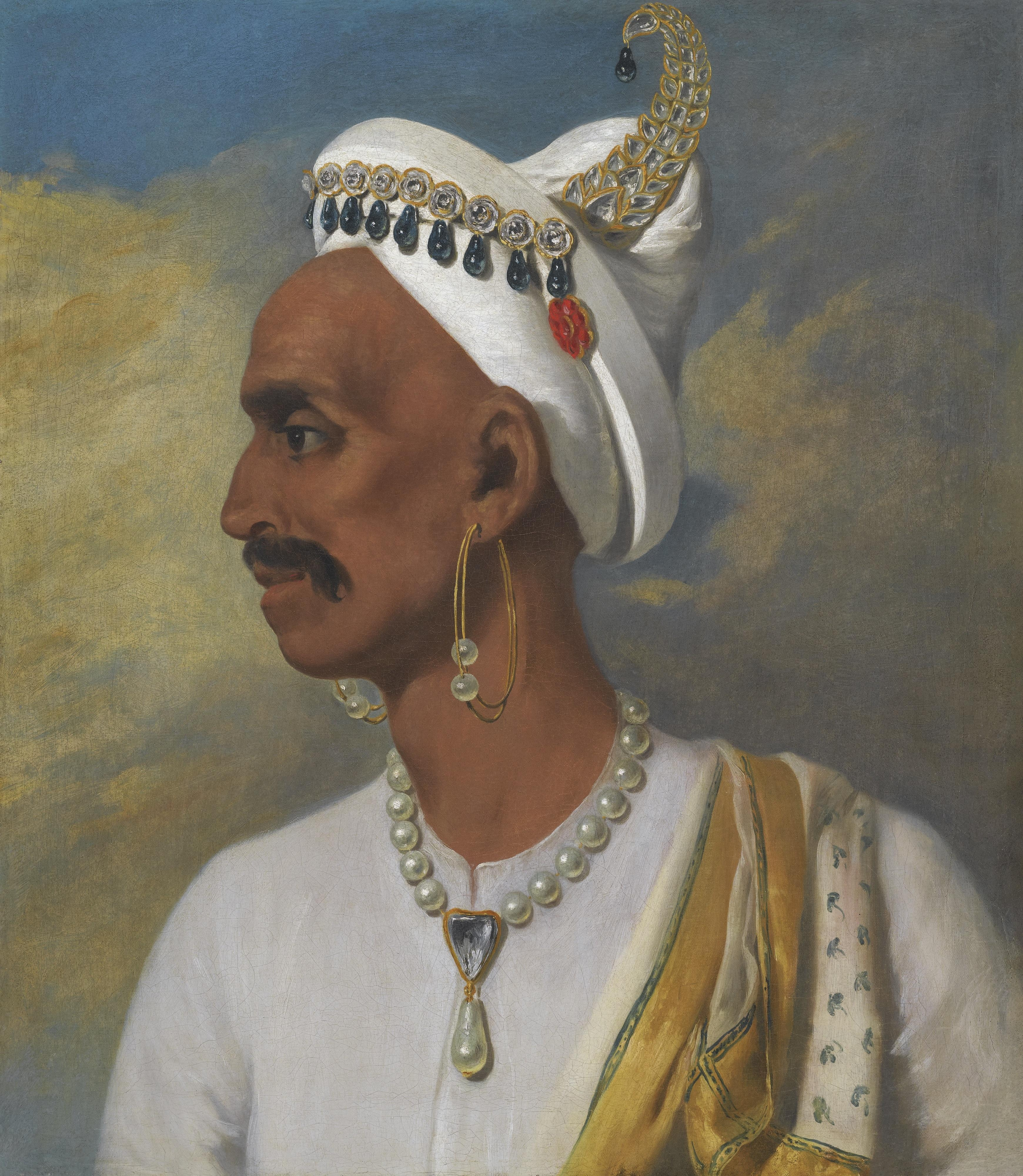
- Portrait by John Thomas Seton, 1778
- Born: Balaji Janardan Bhanu; 12 February 1742; Satara, Maratha Empire (present-day Maharashtra, India)
- Died: 13 March 1800 (aged 58); Pune, Maratha Empire (present-day Maharashtra, India)
- Religion: Hinduism
- Occupation: Prominent minister and statesman of the Maratha Empire during the Peshwa administration

Nana Fadnavis (Pronunciation: [naːna pʰəɖɳəʋiːs, fəɖ-]; also Phadnavis and Furnuwees and abbreviated as Phadnis) (12 February 1742 – 13 March 1800), born Balaji Janardan Bhanu, was a Maratha minister and statesman during the Peshwa administration in Pune, India. James Grant Duff states that he was called "the Maratha Machiavelli" by the Europeans.

== Early life ==
Balaji Janardan Bhanu was born into a Chitpavan Brahmin family in Satara in 1742 and was nicknamed "Nana". His grandfather Balaji Mahadaji Bhanu had migrated from a village called Velas near Shrivardhan during the days of the First Peshwa Balaji Vishwanath Bhat. The Bhats and the Bhanus had family relations and a very good friendship existed between them. The two families had respectively inherited the 'Mahajan' or village-head positions of the towns of Velas and Shrivardhan. Balaji Mahadji had once saved the Peshwa from a murderous plot by the Mughals. The Peshwa therefore recommended Chattrapati Shahu to award the title of Phadnavis (one of the Ashtapradhan) on Bhanu. Later, when the Peshwa became the de facto head of state, Phadnavis became the main minister who held key portfolios of Administration and Finance for the Maratha Empire during the Peshwa regime.

Nana was the grandson of Balaji Mahadji Bhanu and had inherited his grandfather's name, keeping up with the tradition. The Peshwa treated him like family and extended to him the same facilities of education and diplomatic training as his sons, Vishwasrao, Madhavrao, and Narayanrao. He continued to be the Phadnavis, or the finance minister, for the Peshwa.

== Peshwa administration ==
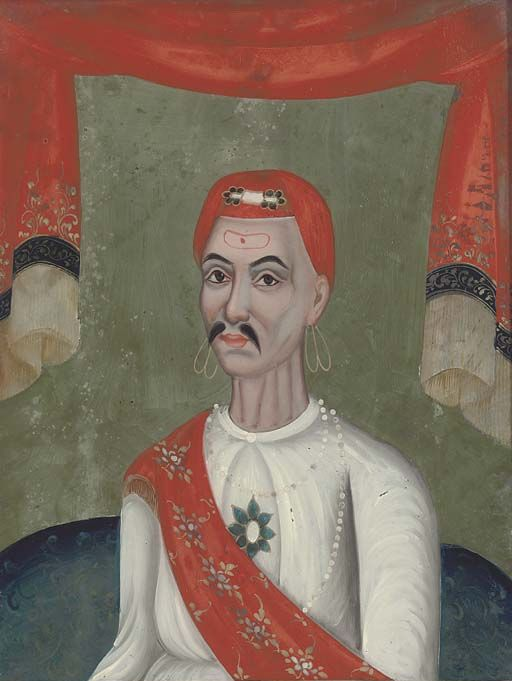
Early 19th-century portrait of Nana

In 1761, Nana escaped to Pune from the Third Battle of Panipat and rose to great heights, becoming a leading personage directing the affairs of the Maratha Confederacy, although he was never a soldier himself. This was a period of political instability as one Peshwa was rapidly succeeded by another, and there were many controversial transfers of power. Nana Phadnavis played a pivotal role in holding the Maratha Confederacy together in the midst of internal dissension and the growing power of the British East India Company.

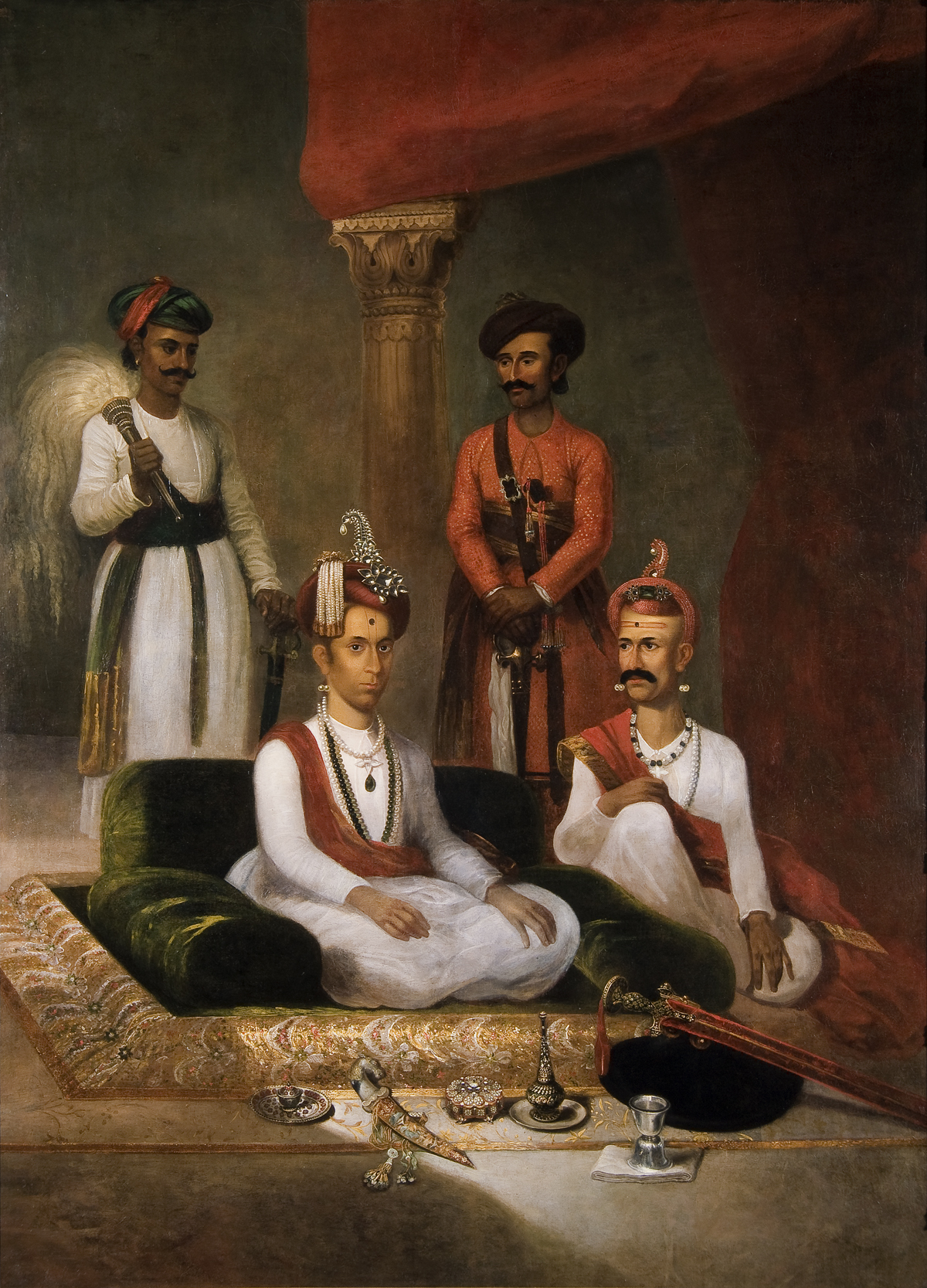
1792 portrait of Nana (seated, right)

Nana's administrative, diplomatic, and financial skills brought prosperity to the Maratha Empire and his management of external affairs kept the Maratha Empire away from the thrust of the British East India Company. He displayed his best warfare skills in various battles won by Maratha forces against the Nizam of Hyderabad, Hyder Ali and Tipu Sultan of Mysore, and the English Army. However, Nana's policy of fighting the Mysoreans, forming a confederation against Tipu Sultan in the Third Anglo-Mysore War with Hyderabad and the British, weakened Tipu Sultan, whose advanced armies had at that point been the bulwark against British control. Furthermore, his policy of remaining neutral in the Fourth Anglo-Mysore War, between the British and Tipu Sultan, weakened support for the latter, paving the way for British dominance in the Indian subcontinent. On hearing of the death of Tipu, Nana remarked that the Marathas had only now realized that they were next, and there was "no escape from [this] destiny".

After the assassination of Peshwa Narayanrao in 1773, Nana Phadnavis managed the affairs of the state with the help of a twelve-member regency council known as the Barabhai council. The council was Nana's mastermind plan to protect Madhavrao II, son of Narayanrao, born posthumously to Gangabai, the widow of Narayanrao, from the Peshwa family's internal conflicts. The Barabhai Council was an alliance of influential Sardars (generals) led by Nana. Other members of the council were Haripant Phadke, Moroba Phadnis, Sakaram Bapu Bokil, Trimbakraomama Pethe, Mahadji Shinde, Tukojirao Holkar, Phaltankar, Bhagwanrao Pratinidhi, Maloji Ghorpade, Sardar Raste, and Babuji Naik. During this time, the Maratha Empire was significant in size with a number of vassal states under a treaty of protection who recognized the Peshwa as the supreme power.

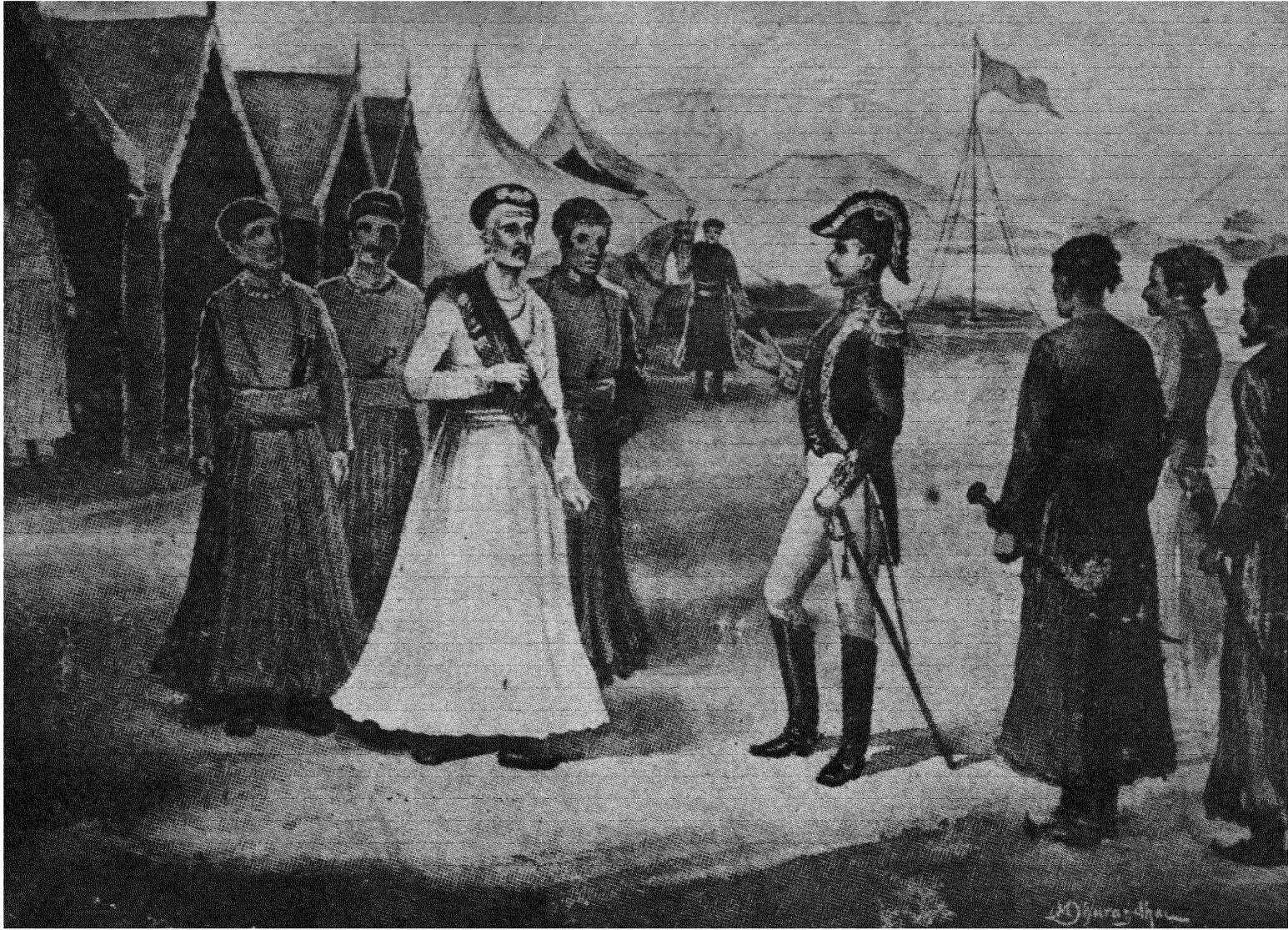
Capture of Nana Fadnavis

While visiting Daulat Rao Sindhia's camp one day in 1798, Nana was suddenly imprisoned, leading to unprecedented looting and anarchy in Pune. He was released a few months later. After a short illness, Nana died at Pune on 13 March 1800. Following his death, Peshwa Baji Rao II placed himself in the hands of the British, provoking the Second Anglo-Maratha War that began the breakup of the Maratha confederacy.

== Menavali palace ==
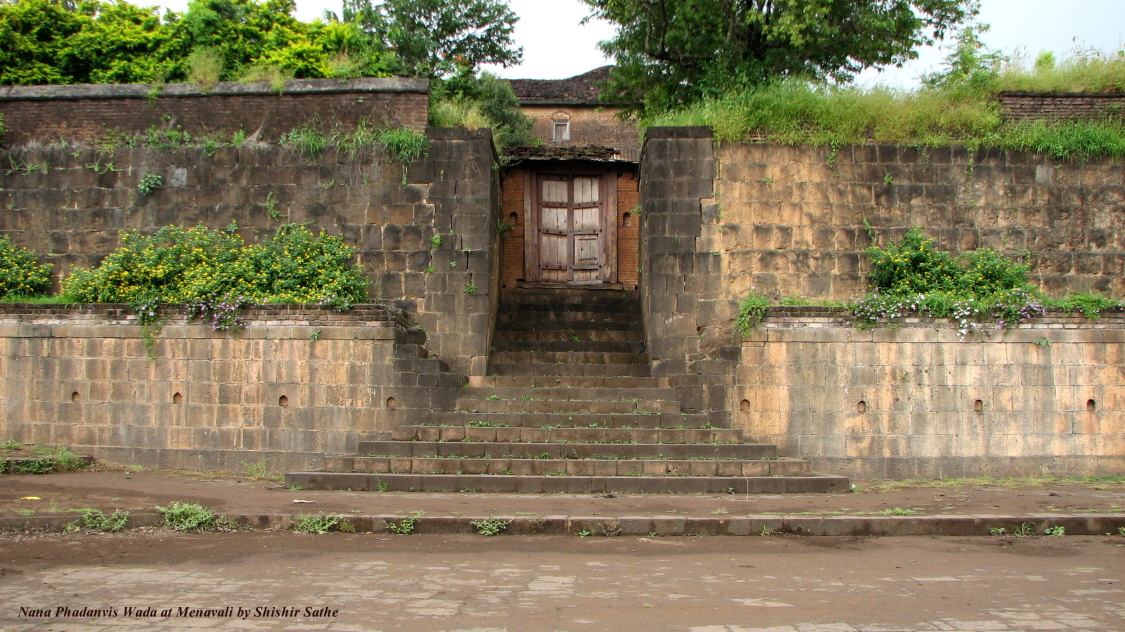
Rear entrance to Nana Phadanvis' house (Nana phadanvis wada), which is still preserved today in the same condition as when Nana built it in 1780. Location: Menawali near Wai in Satara district of Maharashtra

Bhavan Rao Trymbak Pant Pratinidhi of Aundh and Raghunath Ghanshyam Mantri (of Satara) bestowed the village of Menavali upon Nana Phadnavis in December 1768. Nana Phadnavis settled the village and built a Wada (A mansion with inner courtyards), a Ghat (steps) leading from the mansion to the Krishna river, and two temples, one dedicated to Lord Vishnu and another to Meneshwar (मेणेश्वर) Lord Shiva. The architectural combination of a wada-type residence, a ghat on a waterbody, and a temple was typical of the Peshwa era. However, most of these palatial structures fell into disuse and disrepair after the lands and estates of the owners were taken away by the government after India became a republic in 1947. The Nana Phadnavis Wada on the bank of the river Krishna at Menavali is one of the very rare places where such a combination is preserved intact. The Nana Phadnavis wada is a large structure with six quadrangles, or courtyards, and a perimeter-protection wall. This construction of the complex was completed around 1780. Other notable wadas nearby are the Raste Wada and Ranade wada in Wai.

After Nana Phadnavis died in 1800, the Peshwa Baji Rao II confiscated the wada. Governor-General Wellesley (brother of the Duke of Wellington) returned the property to Nana's wife Jeeubai on 25 March 1804. After her death, Sir Bartle Frere (Governor of Bombay) handed over the property to Nana's descendants. The Nana Phadnavis wada today remains with his descendants. Having split the major part of his properties between themselves, the wada is still owned jointly by them all.

Ghats, which were originally nothing more than simple stone steps descending into a river, evolved during the Peshwa era into an elaborate arrangement of terraces with separate areas for different activities such as bathing, washing, filling water, and performing religious rites. Temples were traditionally built on ghats.

Nana, being the Peshwas' "Phadnavis", transcribed and maintained their documents of accounts and administrative letters in the ancient "Modi" script. These documents, known as the famous "Menavli Daptar", were preserved in the wada at Menavali.

There is a dark, musty, narrow, steep staircase concealed in the metre-thick wall, leading to the floor above. The staircase was once secret and easily secured, admitting only one person at a time into Nana Phadnavis's darbar hall. Nana Phadnavis's reception "darbar" hall has an attached bedroom with a teakwood bedstead. The bedstead is an intricately carved four-poster. The floor is paved with clay and cow dung.

Wadas are systems of open courtyards with increased security. Nana's corridors on the upper floor are lined with teakwood lattice work. A concealed escape stairway in the wall leads out of the wada. Descending the stone steps leads to the ghat on the river Krishna. On descending the steps and turning right, one sees a peaceful and rather drab view of Pandavgarh in the distance.

The bell house of the Meneshwar temple houses a six-hundred-and-fifty-kilogram bell. This bell was captured by Bajirao I's brother Chimaji Appa from a cathedral in the Portuguese fort at Bassein. Dating from 1707, the five-alloy bell bears a bas-relief of Mary carrying the infant Jesus Christ cast into it. An ancient tree with a massive coniform trunk has a platform constructed around it as old as the wada itself. This tree featured in the Bollywood movie Swades. In the movie, the village elders hold a Panchayat on the stone platform around this tree.

Several Bollywood movies have been shot there, using the wada as an exotic location, notably Yudh (Jackie Shroff/Tina Munim), Mrityudand (Madhuri Dixit), Goonj Uthi Shehnai, Jis Desh Mein Ganga Rehta Hain (Govinda), Gangaajal (Ajay Devgan), Sarja (Ajinkya Deo), and Swades (Shahrukh Khan, Gayatri Joshi). The film crew of the movie Swades once camped at the ghat to shoot some footage. The crew cleaned and painted the old stone walls of the ghat and the temples.

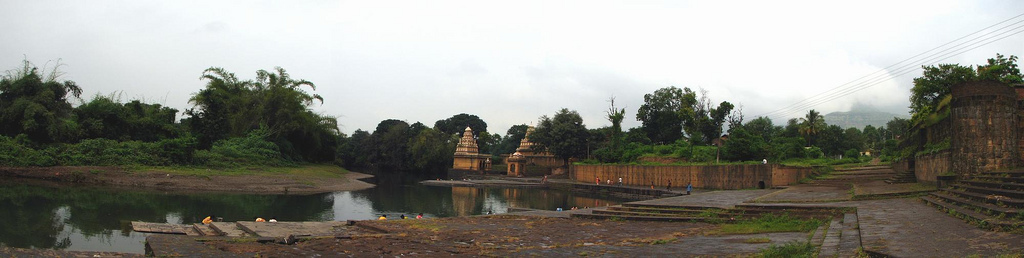
Nana Fadnavis Wada

== In popular culture ==
- In the 1994 Hindi TV series The Great Maratha, Nana is portrayed by Hariom Parashar.
- In the 2019 film Panipat, Nana is portrayed by Dushyant Wagh.
