= Rakshasbhuvan =

Village in Maharashtra, India

Rakshasbhuvan is a place in Beed district, Maharashtra, Marathawada, India which is situated on the bank of the river Godavari.
