= Gopikabai =

Indian noble (1724–1788)

Peshwin' Gopika Bai
- Born: 20 December 1724; Supa, Parner, India
- Died: 11 August 1788 (aged 63); Nashik
- Spouse: Peshwa Balaji Baji Rao
- Children: Vishwasrao; Madhavrao I; Narayan Rao
- Father: Bhikaji Naik Raste
- Relatives: Anandrao Raste (brother)

Gopika
- House: Bhat (by marriage); Raste (by birth)

Gopikabai (20 December 1724 – 11 August 1778) was Peshwin of Maratha Empire, as the wife of Peshwa Balaji Baji Rao (also called Nanasaheb Peshwa). She had a very orthodox religious upbringing and belief. After the death of Nanasaheb Peshwa, she tried to expand her power over the Peshwa and the administration. She influenced her son Madhavrao Peshwa, who by sidelining Raghunathrao at her urging, assumed control. However, after trying to interfere in administrative matters, namely to save her brother from punishment, she was confined to Nashik. In 1773 she was freed after the death of Madhavarao and went back to Pune. Afterwards, Gopikabai became part of the priestly class. She developed a rivalry with other women in the Peshwa's household. She was the mother of two successive Peshwas.

== Childhood ==
Gopikabai was the daughter of Bhikaji Naik Raste of Wai, near Pune. Gopikabai was noticed by Radhabai, the mother of Peshwa Baji Rao I, during her visit to the Raste family. She was impressed by Gopikabai's orthodox observance of religious fasting and rituals and selected her to marry Balaji Bajirao (Nanasaheb), the eldest son of Baji Rao I and grandson of Radhabai. Gopikabai was well versed in priestly religious matters and the prevailing customs followed in priestly Brahmin families.

== Orthodox upbringing ==
Gopikabai faced severe drawbacks in her later life as she was underexposed or never given proper training in handling court administrative or military matters. Her orthodox religious upbringing was thought to be a major cause of her haughty behaviour and narrow-minded outlook. Some of the crueler decisions which Gopikabai took in later life, including severing relations with her second son Madhavrao are traced to her orthodox upbringing. Gopikabai's religious upbringing left her unable to understand court politics which Shahu and Nanasaheb Peshwa were pursuing.

== Envy and ego ==
After her husband became Peshwa, Gopikabai was unable to get along with the other women in the Peshwa's household and developed a rivalry with her cousin Anandibai who was married to the Peshwa's brother Raghunathrao. There was also a rift between Gopikabai and Parvatibai, the wife of the Peshwa's cousin Sadashivrao Bhau which occurred when Shahu and Nanasaheb Peshwa selected Parvatibai's niece Radhikabai to marry her eldest son Vishwasrao. Gopikabai insisted on sending Vishwasrao along with Sadashivrao Bhau (Bhausaheb) to battle against Abdali as she did not want Bhausaheb to take all the accolades after defeating Abdali and wanted Vishwasrao to play a bigger role. She did this to ensure that Vishwasrao becomes the next Peshwa after Nanasaheb. She suspected Nanasaheb of planning to make Bhausaheb the next Peshwa.

== Death of Nanasaheb Peshwa ==
Gopikabai blamed Radhikabai for being a bad omen and causing the death of her son Vishwasrao during the Third battle of Panipat. Instead of giving emotional support, Gopikabai continually nagged Nanasaheb Peshwa that he was responsible for the death of her son which was a major cause of Nanasaheb Peshwa's death from depression at Parvati near Pune.

== Ascendency and reign of Madhavrao ==
After the death of Nanasaheb Peshwa, a dispute arose about appointments in the Peshwa administration. Chhatrapati Shahu had died without an heir and by this time the post of Peshwa had become hereditary. Gopikabai, advised by her brother, attempted to involve herself in administrative matters. Since Vishwasrao, Nanasaheb's first son and legal heir, had already died, a dispute arose whether Madhavrao, Nanasaheb's second son, or Raghunathrao, Nanasaheb's younger brother should ascend the post. This was fueled by the fact that Gopikabai's relations with Anandibai, the wife of Raghunathrao, were not cordial.

Finally, it was decided that Madhavrao would ascend the post of Peshwa, under the guidance of Raghunathrao. This decision was a setback for Gopikabai who had hoped to have a controlling influence over her son on becoming the Peshwa but now would have to take up matters with Raghunathrao, who in turn was under the strong influence of his wife Anandibai. Moreover, Gopikabai's lack of proper training for court administration made her susceptible to poor advice from courtiers spoiling her relationship with her son. With help from her brother Sardar Raste, who had become an influential moneylender, she tried to influence her son Madhavrao Peshwa.

Madhavrao Peshwa started taking an active part in administrative matters and displayed an intelligent decision-making ability. Gopikabai urged him to be assertive and do away with Raghunathrao's control over his administration. A few wrong decisions on Raghunathrao's part caused a wide rift in the administration. Sardar Raste collaborated with Nizam of Hyderabad and Bhonsale of Nagpur during their invasion of Pune against Raghunathrao's administration.

== Confinement at Nashik ==
By sidelining Raghunathrao, Madhavrao Peshwa assumed control of the Peshwa administration. One of his first acts was to punish those who had assisted Nizam, prominent among them Sardar Raste. Gopikabai, who pleaded for mercy for her brother, was sternly warned of the consequences of such an act and was told not to interfere in administrative matters. When she persisted, she was confined to Nashik. Gopikabai remained at Nashik, performing orthodox Hindu rituals, until the death of Madhavrao in 1773 from tuberculosis. As Madhavrao died without an heir, Raghunathrao again made his claim for control of the Peshwa administration at Anandibai's insistence.

== Return to Pune ==
Narayanrao, Gopikabai's third son, was appointed Peshwa. Upon Narayanrao's appointment, Gopikabai returned to Pune and again began to interfere in the administration. During this time, Gopikabai involved herself increasingly in religious rituals. This was during an era when the Brahmin way of life was at its zenith, and huge monetary grants were given for performing religious rituals. The priestly class occupied important administrative posts.

Narayanrao's administration was paralyzed by debt and increasing opposition to him especially from Raghunathrao and Anandibai led to him being murdered. This incident was another setback for Gopikabai, and she again lost the control which she had gained a year and a half earlier and had to return to Nashik.

== In popular culture ==
- In the 1994 Hindi TV series The Great Maratha, Gopikabai's character was portrayed by Shama Deshpande.
- In the 2014 Indian Marathi-language film, Rama Madhav, she is portrayed by Mrinal Kulkarni.
- In the 2019 Hindi film, Panipat, Gopikabai's character was portrayed by Padmini Kolhapure.
- In 2019 Marathi TV series, Swamini, she was portrayed by Aishwarya Narkar.
