= Parvati Temple =

Parvati Temple is a temple dedicated to the goddess Parvati. It may specifically refer to:

- Parvati Temple, Khajuraho
- Parvati Temple, Odisha
- Parvati Temple, located on Parvati Hill, Pune
