= Rama Madhav =

- Directed by: Mrinal Kulkarni
- Story by: Mrinal Kulkarni
- Starring: Alok Rajwade; Parna Pethe; Ravindra Mankani; Mrinal Kulkarni; Prasad Oak; Sonalee Kulkarni; Amol Kolhe; Shruti Marathe
- Edited by: Jayant Jathar
- Music by: Anand Modak
- Release date: 8 August 2014
- Country: India
- Language: Marathi

Rama Madhav is a 2014 Indian Marathi-language historical drama directed by Mrinal Kulkarni, It takes place during the Peshwa era. Rama Madhav was released on 8 August 2014.

== Plot ==
The story starts from where Chhoti Rama is playing. All she knows as a child is that she was married to the son of a Peshwa. As a child, Rama enters Shaniwarwada for the first time wearing saree and at a very young age she has a responsibility. Nanasaheb Peshwa, who was devastated by the defeat at Panipat and was disappointed by Vishwasrao's death, Madhavrao gets the post of Peshwa at very young age.

== Cast ==
- Alok Rajwade as Madhavrao I
- Parna Pethe as Ramabai Peshwa
- Ravindra Mankani as Peshwa Nanasaheb
- Mrinal Kulkarni as Gopikabai
- Prasad Oak as Raghunathrao
- Sonalee Kulkarni as Anandibai
- Amol Kolhe as Sadashivrao Bhau
- Shruti Marathe as Parvatibai
- Shruti Karlekar
- Suchitra Bandekar
- Aditi Rao Hydari in special appearance

== Critical response ==
Namita Nivas of Indian Express praised Kulkarni's direction as well as the cinematography, costuming and set design, but felt that the second half of the film was paced too slowly.
