= Balaji Baji Rao =

Peshwa of the Maratha Empire from 1740 to 1761

Shrimant Peshwa Nana Saheb I
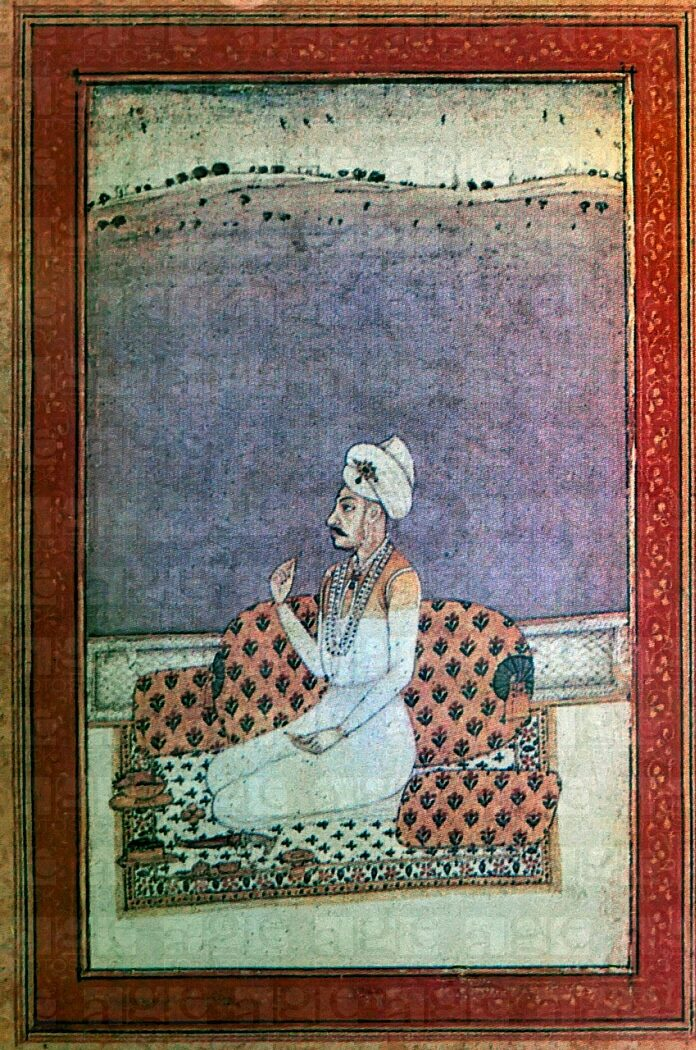
- 18th-century portrait of Balaji Bajirao

8th Peshwa of the Maratha Empire
- In office August 1740 – 23 June 1761
- Monarchs: Shahu I; Rajaram II
- Preceded by: Bajirao I
- Succeeded by: Madhavrao I

Personal details
- Born: Balaji Rao Bhat; 8 December 1720 Sate Mawal, Pune, Maratha Empire (modern day Maharashtra, India)
- Died: 23 June 1761 (aged 40) Parvati Hill, Pune, Maratha Empire (modern day Maharashtra, India)
- Spouse: Gopikabai (m. 1730)
- Children: Vishwasrao; Madhavrao I Narayanrao
- Parent(s): Bajirao I (father); Kashibai (mother)
- Relatives: Raghunathrao (brother); Sadashivrao Bhau (cousin); Shamsher Bahadur I (half-brother)
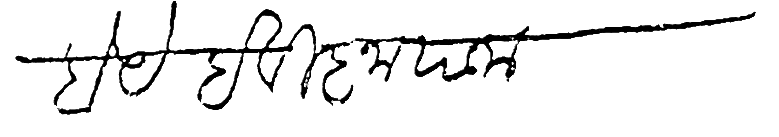
- Signature

Balaji Baji Rao (8 December 1720 – 23 June 1761), commonly known as Nana Saheb I, was the eighth Peshwa of the Maratha Empire. He succeeded his father, Bajirao I, as Peshwa in 1740.

During his tenure, the Chhatrapati (Maratha monarch) served largely as a titular head, while effective power remained with the Peshwa. Under Balaji Baji Rao’s administration, the Maratha Empire evolved into a confederation, with prominent chiefs such as the Holkars, the Scindias, and the Bhonsles of Nagpur gaining semi-autonomous authority. The Maratha domains reached their greatest territorial extent during his period.

Balaji Baji Rao’s administration, assisted by his paternal cousin Sadashivrao Bhau, introduced several fiscal and administrative reforms. Under his leadership, the boundaries of the Maratha Empire extended from Peshawar (in present-day Pakistan) in the northwest to Srirangapatna in Karnataka, and to Midnapore in West Bengal.

Balaji Baji Rao sponsored public works across the empire, including the construction of canals, bridges, temples, and travellers’ rest houses, particularly in Pune, the imperial capital. During his twenty-year reign, he brought under Maratha dominance several major powers of the Indian subcontinent—subduing the Mughals in the north, the Nizam of Hyderabad in the south, and the Nawab of Bengal in the east. He also weakened Afghan control over Punjab, curtailed their incursions toward Delhi, subdued the Rajput and Rohilla states, and effectively neutralized the State of Oudh.

== Early years and family ==
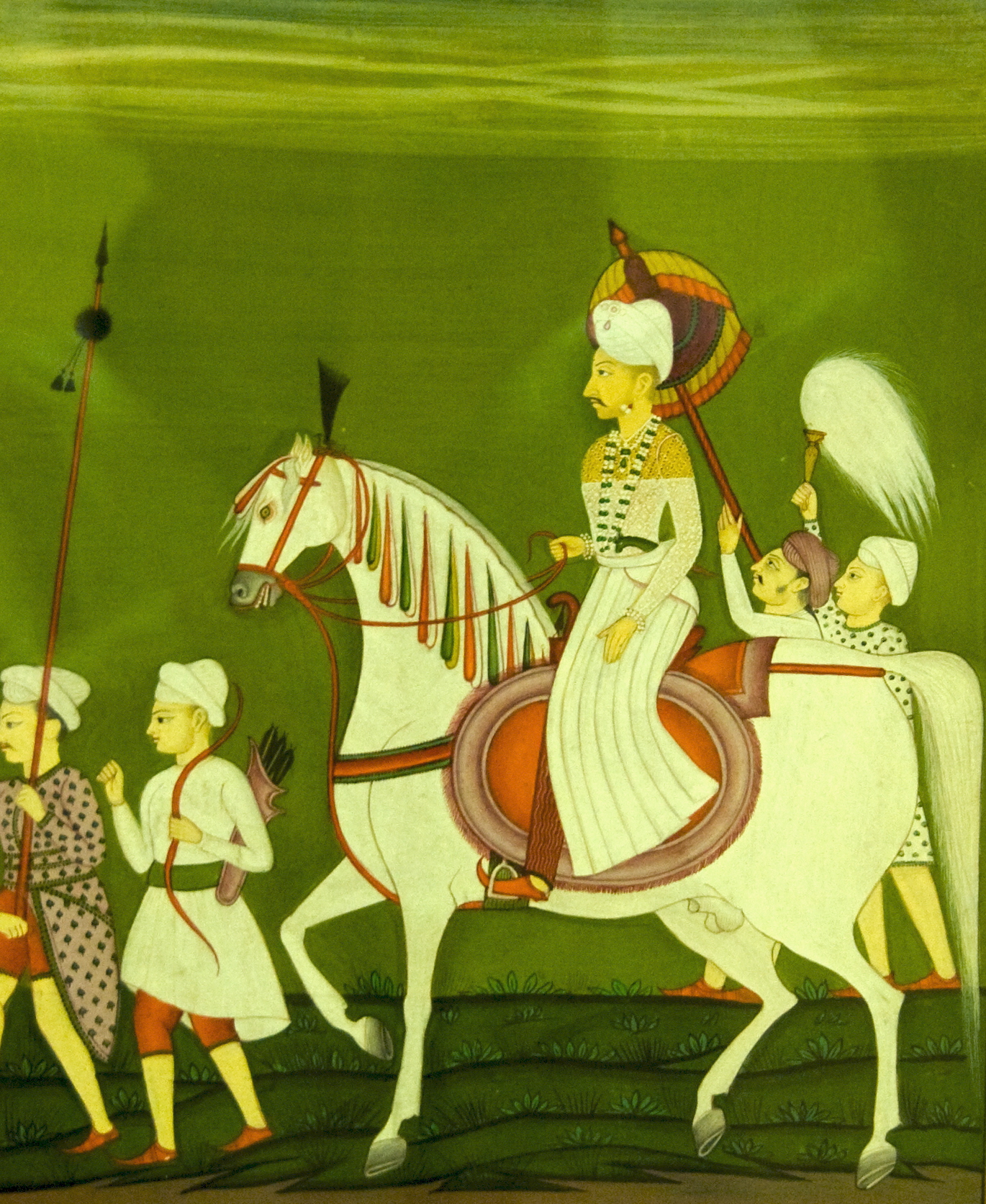
Painting of Balaji Baji Rao riding a horse at Chhatrapati Shivaji Maharaj Museum, Mumbai

Balaji Rao, later known as Balaji Baji Rao or Nanasaheb, was born on 8 December 1720 into the Bhat family to Peshwa Baj Rao I and Kashibai.

After the death of Baji Rao I in April 1740, the fifth Maratha ruler, Chhatrapati Shahu I appointed the 19-year-old Balaji Rao as Peshwa in August of the same year, despite opposition from several Maratha chiefs, including Raghoji I Bhonsle.

When Balaji Rao was ten years old, his grandmother, Radhabai, met Gopikabai—a young girl from the prominent Raste family of Pune—during a family visit. Gopikabai was six years old at the time, and Radhabai was impressed by her orthodox upbringing, piety, and knowledge of religious customs typical of a devout Brahmin household. Impressed by her virtues, Radhabai proposed her marriage to Balaji Rao. The two were married on 11 January 1730.

The couple had three sons: Vishwasrao, who was killed in the Third Battle of Panipat in 1761; Madhavrao I, who succeeded Nanasaheb as Peshwa; and Narayan Rao, who later succeeded Madhavrao during his late teens. Nanasaheb’s brother, Raghunathrao, was an able administrator but his ambitions to become Peshwa ultimately proved disastrous for the Maratha Empire.

== Rivalry with Raghoji Bhonsle ==
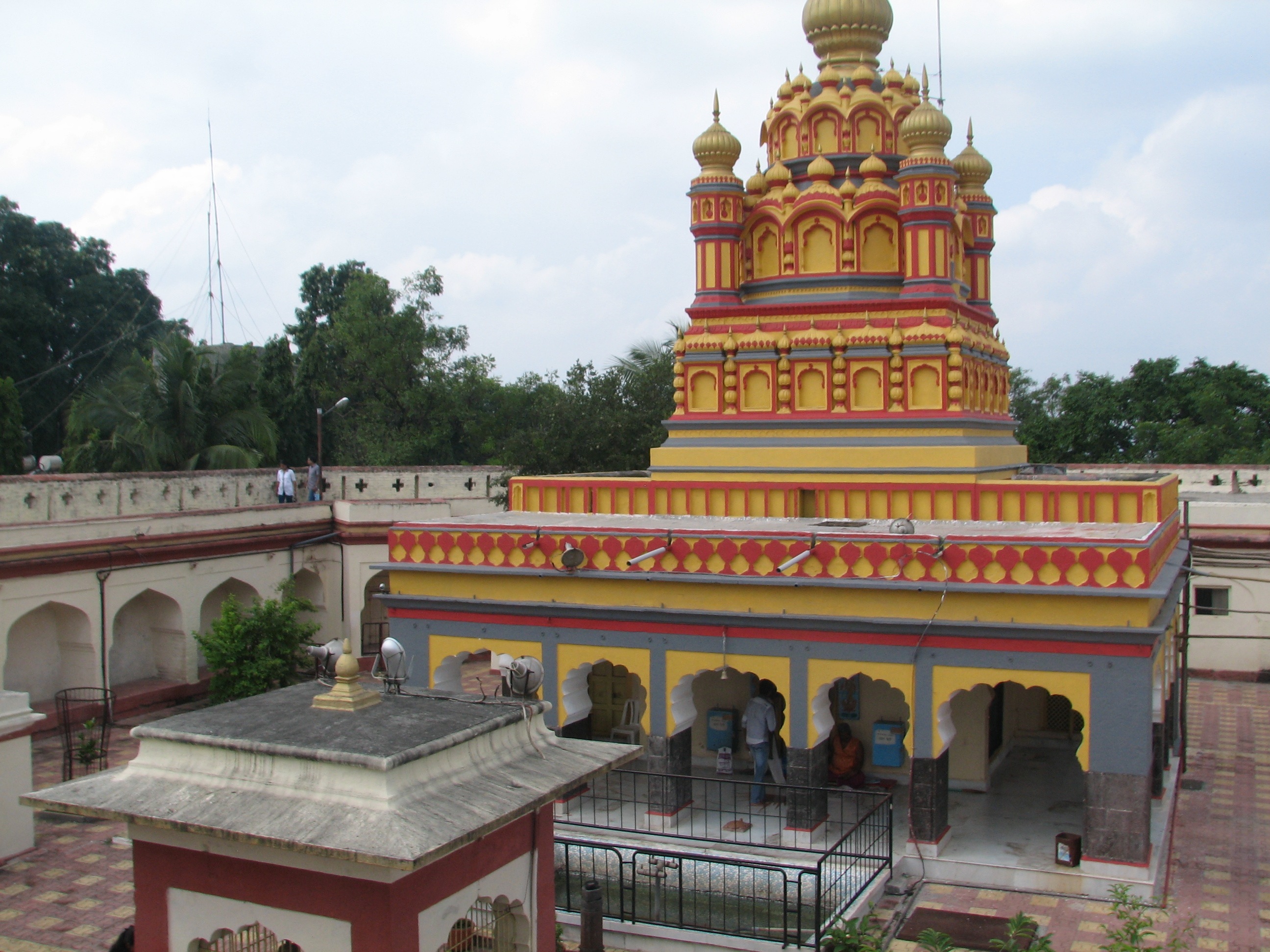
Parvati Hill in Pune, built by Balaji Baji Rao in 1749

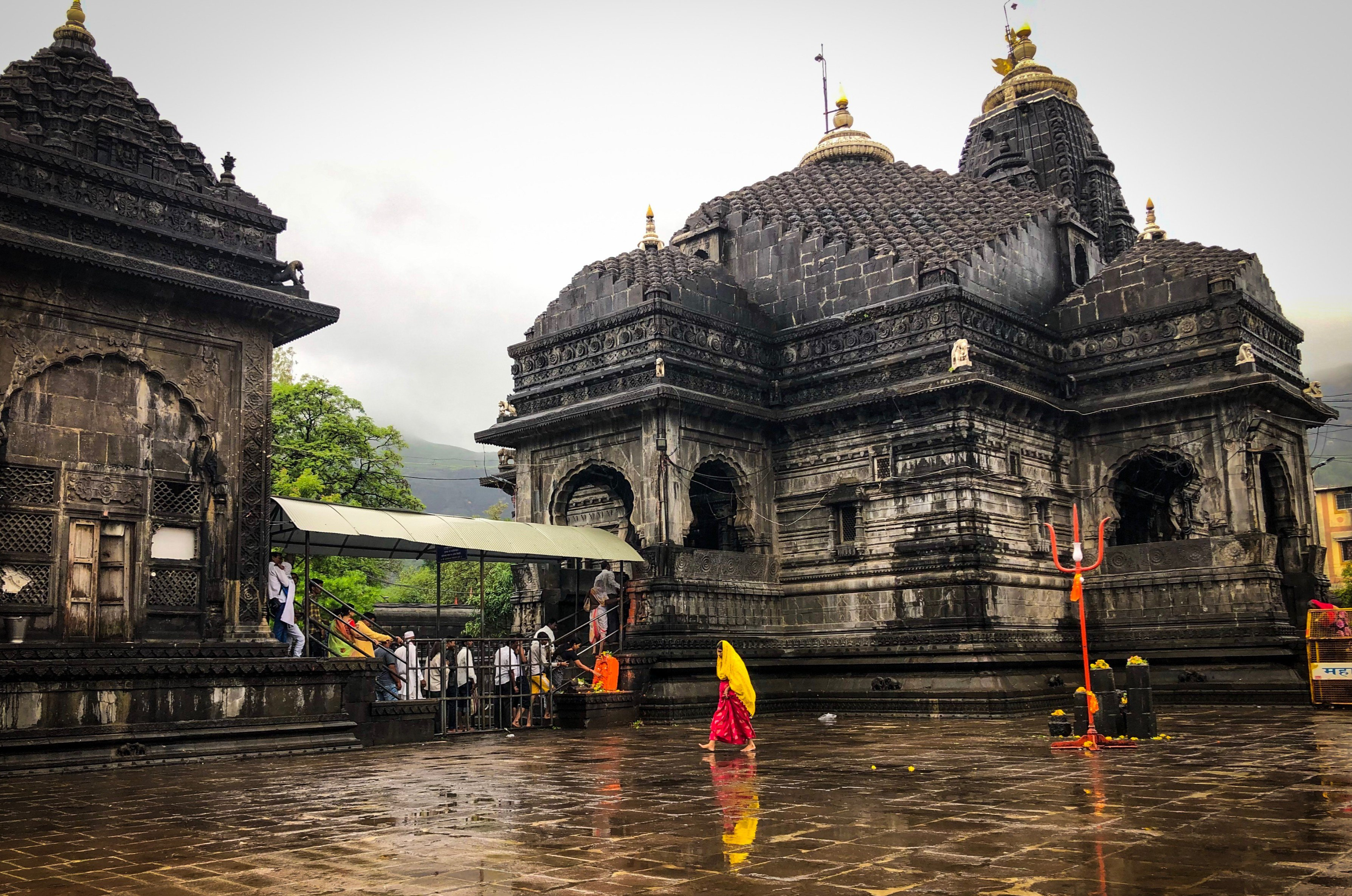
Trimbakeshwar Shiva Temple in Nasik, rebuilt by Balaji Baji Rao in 1755

In the early years of Balaji Baji Rao’s tenure as Peshwa, Raghoji I Bhonsle played a key role in extending Maratha influence in the southern and eastern regions of the Indian subcontinent. However, his relationship with the Peshwa was strained from the outset.

Shortly before Balaji Baji Rao’s appointment as Peshwa, Raghoji had led a Maratha force to the southern territories to assist Pratap Singh of Thanjavur, a member of the Bhonsle clan, against Dost Ali Khan. Raghoji killed Dost Ali in May 1740 and installed Dost Ali’s son, Safdar Ali Khan, as the Nawab of Arcot. Upon returning to Satara, Raghoji unsuccessfully protested Balaji Baji Rao’s appointment as Peshwa before returning south. There, in March 1741, he defeated Chanda Sahib but was soon forced to retreat due to the intervention of Chanda Sahib’s French allies from Pondicherry. After returning to Satara, Raghoji continued to oppose Balaji Baji Rao’s authority.

In 1743, Raghoji Bhonsle attacked the forces of Alivardi Khan in Orissa. Alivardi Khan subsequently paid ₹2,000,000 to Balaji Baji Rao, who assisted him in driving Raghoji out of Orissa in 1744. Raghoji then appealed directly to Shahu I, who appointed him in charge of Maratha affairs in Orissa, Bengal, and Bihar. By 1752, Raghoji had taken over the administration of Orissa and was conducting regular raids into Bengal and Bihar to collect chauth (tribute). The political instability caused by his campaigns in Bengal later facilitated the rise of the East India Company in the region.

== Rebellion by Tarabai and Umabai ==
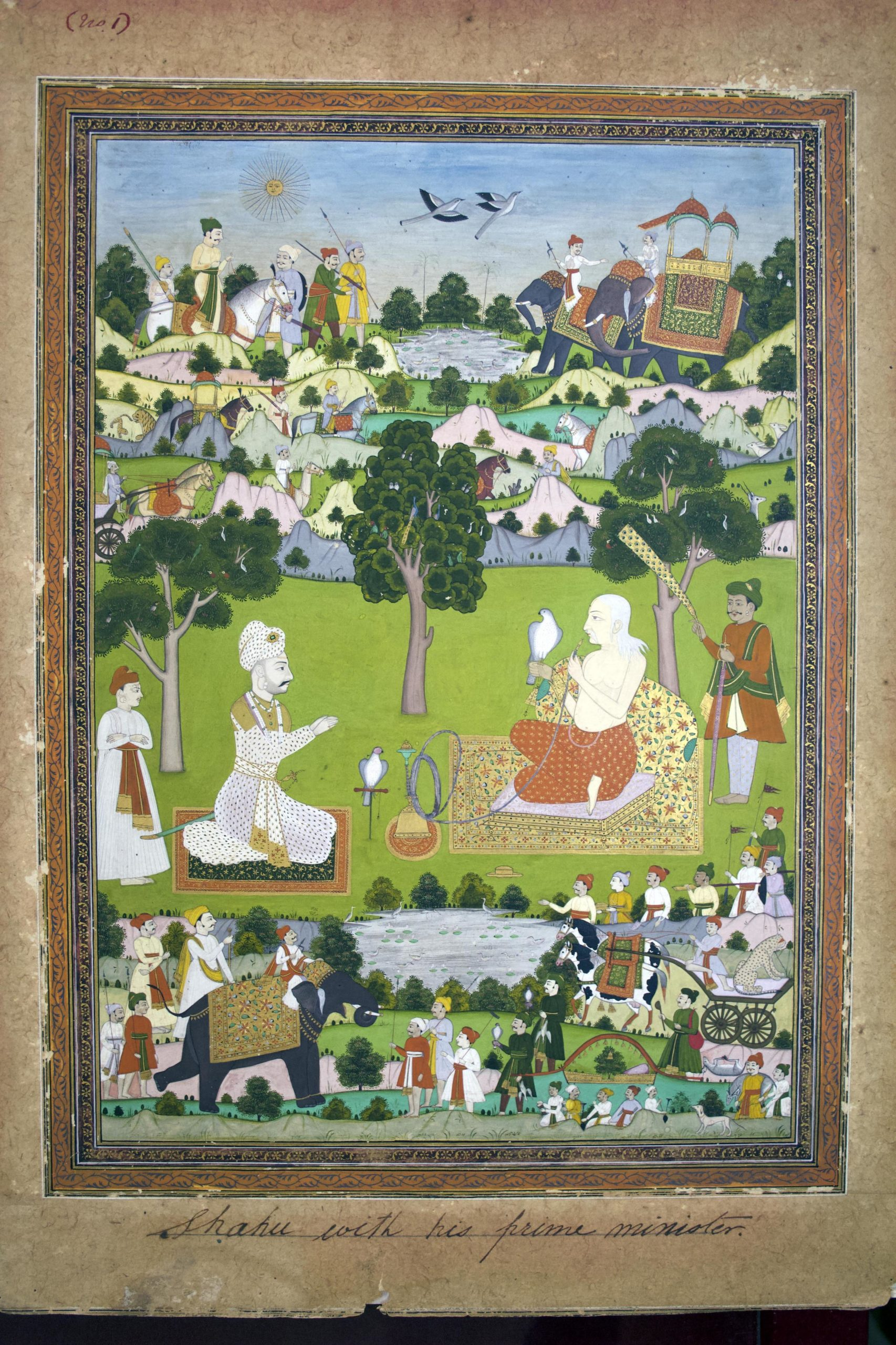
Balaji Baji Rao meets Chatrapati Shahu I, by Shivram Chitari c. 1750

Tarabai, the senior widow of the third Maratha ruler, Rajaram I, was granted asylum by her nephew, Chhatrapati Shahu I, after being released from captivity by her stepson Sambhaji II of Kolhapur. During the 1740s, in Shahu I’s final years, Tarabai presented to him a boy named Rajaram II, claiming he was her grandson and a direct descendant of the first Maratha ruler, Shivaji I. Shahu I accepted this claim and adopted the boy. Upon Shahu I’s death in 1749, Rajaram II succeeded him as Chhatrapati.

In 1750, while Balaji Baji Rao was campaigning against the Nizam of Hyderabad, Tarabai urged Rajaram II to dismiss him from the office of Peshwa. When the Chhatrapati refused, she imprisoned him in a dungeon at Satara on 24 November 1750, claiming that he was an impostor whom she had falsely presented as her grandson. Tarabai failed to secure support from other Maratha nobles or from the Nizam, Salabat Jung, but she managed to gain the backing of Umabai Dabhade. Umabai was the matriarch of the Dabhade family, hereditary Senapati or commanders-in-chief of the Maratha Empire and controllers of large territories in Gujarat. Her husband had been killed by the Mughals, and her eldest son by Baji Rao I for rebelling against Shahu I. Although Shahu I had pardoned the Dabhades and allowed them to retain their jagirs and titles on the condition that they remit half their Gujarat revenues to the royal treasury, the family had never done so. After Shahu I’s death, Balaji Baji Rao—facing an empty treasury—insisted that they honor this agreement. When Umabai met him in 1750, she argued that the arrangement had been made under duress; the Peshwa rejected her claim.

In support of Tarabai’s rebellion, Umabai dispatched a force of 15,000 troops under her lieutenant Damaji Rao Gaekwad. Gaekwad advanced toward Pune, causing Balaji Baji Rao’s mother Kashibai and grandmother Radhabai to flee to Sinhagad. While encamped at Pargaon near Pune, Gaekwad received a letter from the Peshwa loyalist Mahadji Purandare, denouncing him as a traitor. Gaekwad then redirected his march toward Satara. He defeated Mahadji’s brother, Trimbakrao Purandare, at Nimb—a small town north of Satara—but was later defeated on 15 March 1751 at the Venna River and forced to retreat with heavy losses.

On learning of the rebellion, Balaji Baji Rao marched swiftly from the Mughal frontier, covering 400 miles in 13 days. He reached Satara on 24 April 1751, captured the Yavateshwar garrison, and defeated Tarabai’s troops. After Gaekwad’s forces were surrounded, Balaji Baji Rao demanded that he cede half of Gujarat and pay a war indemnity of ₹2,500,000. Gaekwad refused, saying he was only a subordinate acting under Umabai’s orders. On 30 April, Balaji Baji Rao launched a surprise attack, forcing Gaekwad’s surrender. Balaji Baji Rao then besieged Satara Fort, demanding that Tarabai release Rajaram II, whose health had declined during captivity. She refused, and Balaji Baji Rao withdrew to Pune rather than engage in a prolonged siege.

A subsequent mutiny by Tarabai’s own troops weakened her position. Realizing the futility of continued resistance, she sought peace. She met Balaji Baji Rao in Pune, dismissed her adviser Baburao Jadhav, and accepted the supremacy of the Peshwa’s office. On 14 September 1752, both swore mutual peace at the Khandoba temple in Jejuri, where Tarabai declared under oath that Rajaram II was not her grandson but an impostor of the Gondhali caste. Despite this, Balaji Baji Rao retained Rajaram II as the titular Chhatrapati, a ceremonial and powerless figurehead.

In May 1751, Balaji Baji Rao arrested Damaji Gaekwad and his relatives and imprisoned them in Pune. The Dabhades were later detained and stripped of their jagirs and titles. When Damaji refused to yield half of Gujarat’s territory, he was confined in Lohagad Fort. Eventually, after prolonged negotiations, he agreed in March 1752 to abandon the Dabhades and ally with the Peshwa. In return, Balaji Baji Rao appointed him as the Maratha chief of Gujarat and promised military support against the Mughals. Damaji consented to pay an annual tribute of ₹525,000 and a one-time payment of ₹1,500,000, and to maintain a cavalry of 20,000 horses for the Peshwa's services.

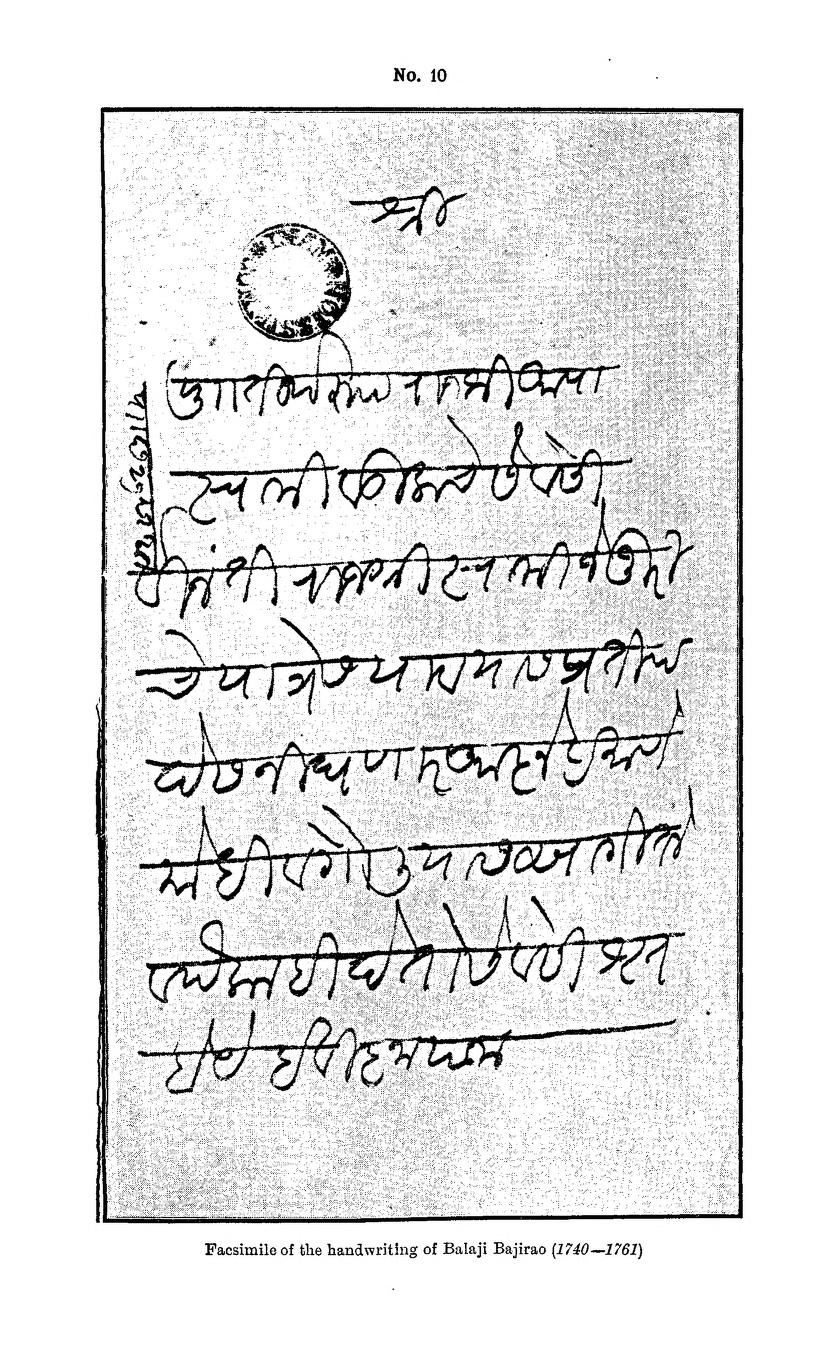
24 Feb 1731. Balaji Baji Rao writes to his paternal uncle Chimaji Appa referring Chhatrapati Shahu I's pilgrimage to Jejuri

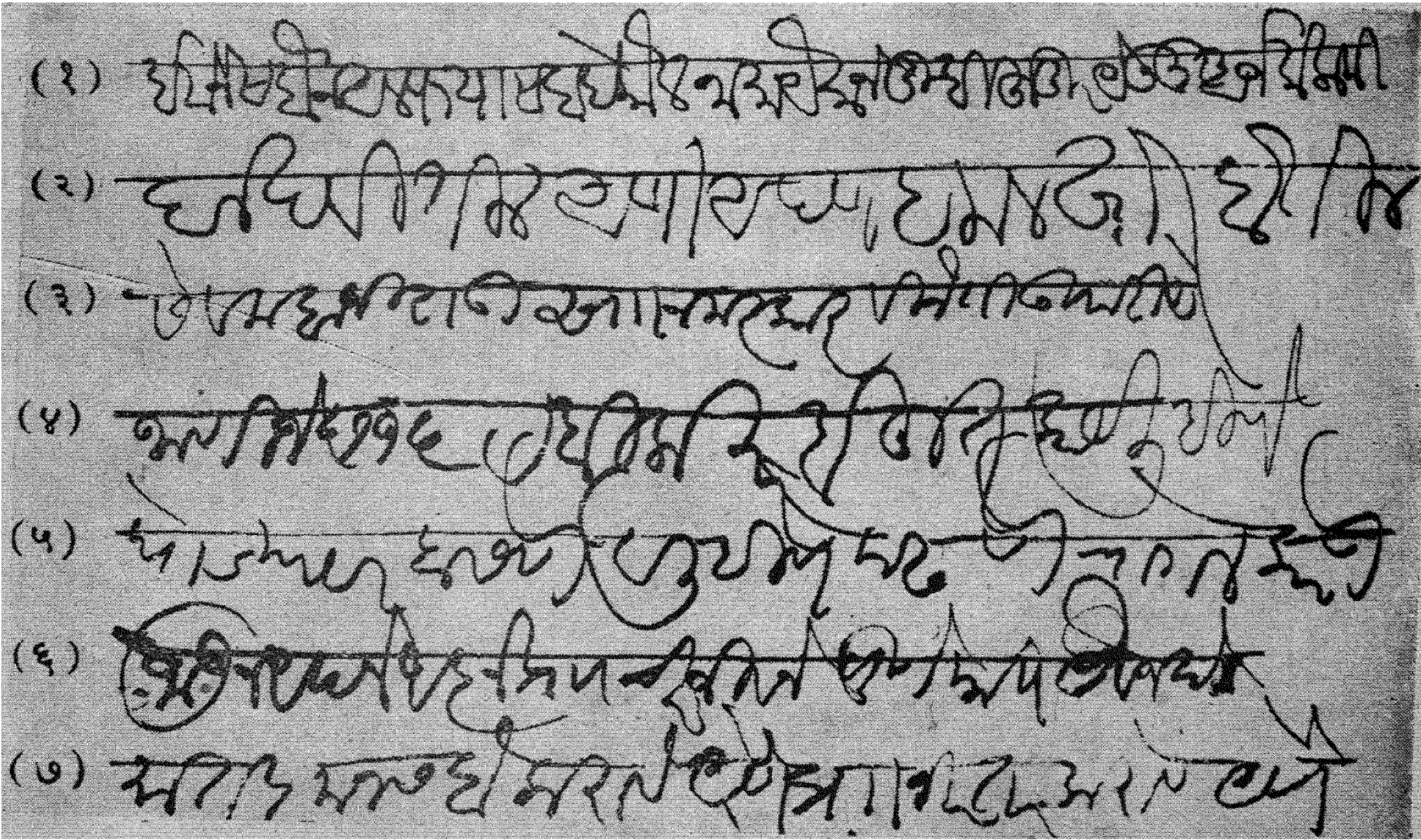
Signatures of the Marathas, Line 4 is written by Balaji Baji Rao

== Campaign against the Nizam ==
In 1751, Balaji Baji Rao launched an invasion of the territories of Salabat Jang, the Nizam of Hyderabad, who was supported by the French Governor-General of Pondicherry, Marquis de Bussy-Castelnau. However, due to Tarabai's rebellion and the growing strength of French-trained forces allied with Maratha rivals, Balaji was compelled to withdraw temporarily from his campaigns.

After restoring internal stability in 1752, Balaji renewed his offensive against the Nizam. Seeking to counter French influence in the Deccan, he approached the British East India Company for military assistance, but the British declined to intervene. The Marathas supported Salabat Jung’s brother, Ghazi ud-Din Khan, as a candidate for the Nizamship, since he had promised them a payment of ₹6,000,000 along with other concessions. However, Ghazi ud-Din was later poisoned by his stepmother, thwarting Maratha plans.

Ultimately, Balaji Baji Rao and de Bussy-Castelnau concluded a peace agreement, bringing an end to hostilities. Around the same time, Raghoji I Bhonsle also agreed to peace on the condition that the Nizam would grant him several jagirs in Berar.

== Relations with Rajputs ==
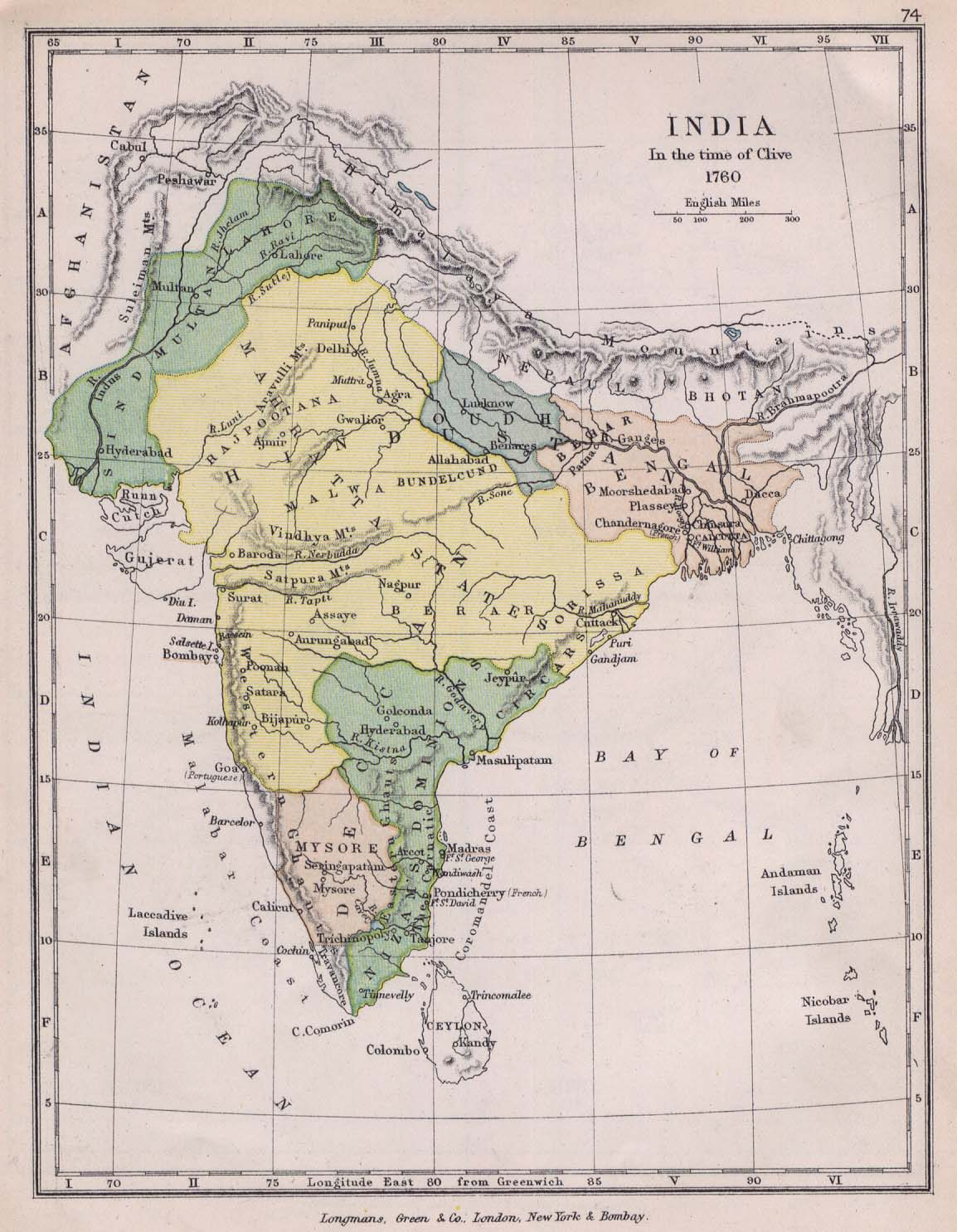
Maratha Confederacy at its zenith in 1760 (yellow areas)

Balaji Baji Rao’s father, Baji Rao I, had aimed to establish a Hindu Padshahi (Hindu kingship) across the Indian subcontinent and therefore maintained cordial relations with the Rajput rulers. However, during Balaji Baji Rao’s tenure as Peshwa, relations between the Marathas and the Rajputs deteriorated.

Following the death of Jai Singh II of Jaipur in 1743, a war of succession broke out between his sons, Ishwari Singh and Madho Singh I. Madho Singh I was supported by Jagat Singh II of Mewar and Ummed Singh of Bundi. The Marathas initially supported Ishwari Singh, who had offered them greater financial incentives. Later, Jagat Singh secured the support of Malhar Rao Holkar for Madho Singh, while Jayappa Rao Scindia continued to back Ishwari Singh. This conflict strained Maratha–Rajput relations and also caused divisions among the Maratha leaders themselves.

Madho Singh subsequently sought arbitration from Balaji Baji Rao, who personally visited Jaipur and persuaded Ishwari Singh to cede four mahals to Madho Singh. Although Ishwari initially agreed, he reneged on the agreement after Balaji returned to Pune. In response, Malhar Rao Holkar captured the mahals by force and imposed a tribute on Ishwari Singh. When Ishwari failed to pay the arrears, the Marathas declared war on him in 1750. Unable to raise the required funds or further tax his subjects, Ishwari Singh committed suicide by consuming poison.

After Ishwari Singh’s death, Madho Singh ascended the Jaipur throne but grew distrustful of the Marathas due to their treatment of his brother. He later fought against them until Safdar Jang, the Nawab of Awadh, intervened and mediated peace, compelling the Marathas to withdraw after offering an apology and some compensation. Following Safdar Jang’s death, the Marathas once again invaded Rajput territories, prompting Madho Singh to seek assistance from Safdar Jang’s successor, Shuja-ud-Daula, and the Afghan ruler Ahmad Shah Abdali.

In 1749, Abhai Singh of Jodhpur died, leading to a succession dispute between his sons Ram Singh and Bakht Singh. Ram Singh sought support from Jayappa Rao Scindia. By the time Scindia marched to Jodhpur in September 1752, Bakht Singh had died and was succeeded by his son, Vijay Singh (also spelled Bijay Singh). Vijay Singh allied with the Mughals, the Rohillas, and Madho Singh of Jaipur to resist the Marathas. After about a year of conflict, Vijay Singh entered into peace negotiations with Scindia. During one such meeting in July 1755, Jayappa Rao Scindia was assassinated by emissaries of Vijay Singh. This incident renewed hostilities between the Marathas and the Rajputs until Dattaji Rao Scindia concluded a peace treaty in February 1756.

== Relations with the Jats ==
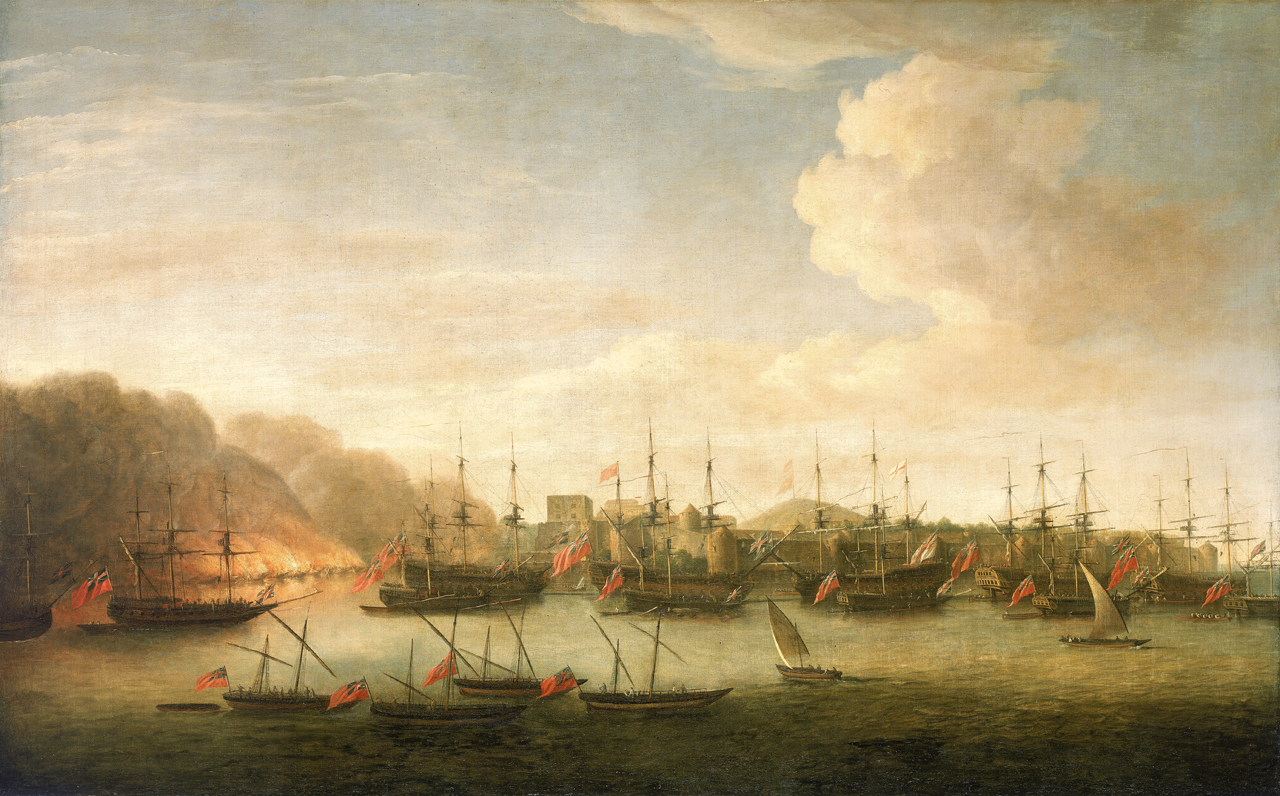
British and Maratha forces raid Vijaydurg Fort during the Battle of Vijaydurg c. 1756

Maratha–Jat relations also deteriorated during Balaji Baji Rao’s tenure as Peshwa. Balaji’s younger brother, Raghunathrao demanded a share of revenue from the prosperous Bharatpur State. Suraj Mal, the ruler of Bharatpur, had earlier interfered in Jaipur’s succession disputes in support of Ishwari Singh, which had antagonized Maratha chiefs such as Malhar Rao Holkar, who supported Madho Singh.

In 1754, the Mughal wazir Safdar Jang sought Suraj Mal’s assistance against the Mughal emperor. To counter this alliance, the imperial loyalist Ghazi ud-Din Khan Feroze Jung III requested Maratha support. Seizing the opportunity, Raghunathrao dispatched a Maratha force under Malhar Rao Holkar to Bharatpur.

Suraj Mal attempted to avert conflict by offering a payment of ₹4,000,000, but Raghunathrao rejected the proposal. Consequently, the Marathas laid siege to the fort of Kumher in early 1754. The siege lasted for about four months before both sides agreed to peace. Under the resulting treaty, the Marathas accepted Suraj Mal’s offer to pay ₹3,000,000 in three annual installments.

== Relations with the Mughals ==
During the tenure of Baji Rao I, the Mughals had nominally granted the Malwa province to the Marathas, although actual control was not transferred. After becoming Peshwa, Balaji Baji Rao sought to regularize Maratha authority in Malwa. Through the mediation of Jai Singh II of Jaipur, he obtained formal recognition from the Mughal emperor, who appointed him as the Deputy Governor of Malwa, with Ahmad Shah Bahadur serving as the titular governor. In return, Balaji pledged allegiance to the Mughal emperor and agreed to maintain a contingent of 500 soldiers at the imperial court, along with an additional force of 4,000 troops to be provided when required.

In 1748, Javed Khan, a rival of the Mughal wazir Safdar Jang, invited the newly appointed Nizam of Hyderabad, Nasir Jung, to join an alliance against the wazir. Safdar Jang sought Maratha assistance, and Balaji Baji Rao dispatched the Scindia and Holkar contingents to intercept Nasir Jung’s forces before they could reach Delhi, thereby safeguarding Safdar Jang’s position.

Beginning in 1748, the Afghan ruler Ahmad Shah Durrani (also known as Ahmad Shah Abdali) launched a series of invasions into northern parts of the Indian subcontinent, compelling the Mughals to once again seek Maratha support. In 1752, the Rohillas of the Doab region rebelled against the emperor and defeated Safdar Jang in battle. The Rohillas subsequently invited Ahmad Shah Durrani to invade Indian territories. Safdar Jang appealed to the Marathas, who assisted him in suppressing the rebellion.

Later in 1752, the Marathas and the Mughals concluded a formal agreement under which the Marathas pledged to assist the empire in repelling both external invasions and internal revolts. In return, the Mughal emperor appointed Balaji Baji Rao as the Governor of Ajmer and Agra. The Marathas were also granted the right to collect chauth from Lahore, Multan, Sindh, and several districts of Hisar and Moradabad. However, to placate Ahmad Shah Durrani, the emperor simultaneously ceded Lahore and Multan to him. Moreover, he did not ratify the transfer of Rajput-ruled regions such as Ajmer to the Marathas, which later brought the Marathas into conflict with both the Durranis and the Rajput states.

== Maratha Expansion into Bengal ==
Between 1741 and 1751, the Marathas under Raghuji Bhonsle of Nagpur invaded the Bengal Subah five times.

In 1743, two separate Maratha armies invaded Bengal—one under Raghuji Bhonsle and the other under Balaji Baji Rao. Facing heavy pressure, Alivardi Khan agreed to pay a subsidy and promised to provide the Marathas with the chauth (one-fourth of the revenue) of Bengal. The prolonged warfare devastated Bengal’s economy and population.

The Maratha forces occupied large parts of western Bengal, advancing up to the Hooghly River. During this period, Maratha raiders known as the "Bargis" committed atrocities against local civilians. Contemporary accounts from the Burdwan Kingdom and European sources report that the Bargis plundered villages extensively. Jan Kersseboom, chief of the Dutch East India Company factory in Bengal, estimated that approximately 400,000 civilians in western Bengal and Bihar perished as a result of the invasions. The destruction wrought by the Bargis is regarded as among the deadliest episodes of mass violence in pre-colonial Indian history.

The 18th-century Bengali text Maharashtra Purana by Gangaram vividly describes the terror caused by the Bargis.

In 1751, a peace treaty was concluded between the Marathas and the Nawab of Bengal. Under its terms, Mir Habib, a former courtier of Alivardi Khan who had defected to the Marathas, was appointed as the provincial governor of Orissa under nominal Bengal authority. The Nawab agreed to become a tributary of the Marathas, paying ₹1.2 million annually as the chauth of Bengal and Bihar, while the Marathas pledged to cease further invasions. In addition, the Nawab paid ₹3.2 million toward arrears of chauth for previous years. The annual chauth payments continued until 1758, when the East India Company took control of Bengal following the Battle of Plassey.

== Conflict with the Durrani Empire ==
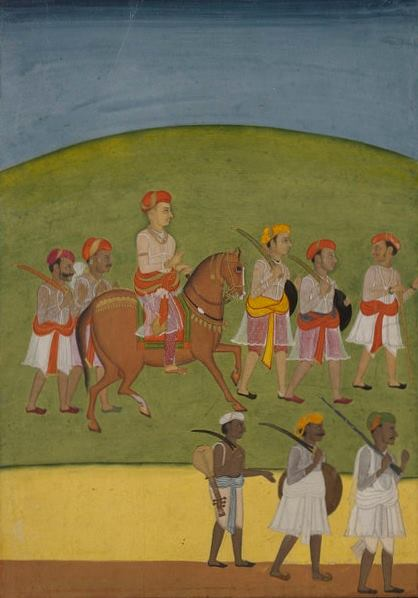
Balaji Baji Rao's troops under the command of his cousin Sadashivrao Bhau fighting at Panipat

After his initial invasions of India, Ahmad Shah Durrani appointed his son Timur Shah Durrani as governor of Punjab and Kashmir. In response, Balaji Baji Rao dispatched his brother Raghunathrao to check Durrani expansion. In 1758, Raghunathrao captured Lahore and Peshawar, driving Timur Shah out of the region. This marked the high point of Maratha territorial expansion — their influence extended from north of the Sindhu River to northern Kerala. The Marathas had now emerged as the principal rivals of the Durranis in north-western India.

By this time, the Marathas had reduced the Mughal emperor to a mere figurehead, and Balaji Baji Rao even considered placing his son Vishwasrao on the Mughal throne. Alarmed by these developments, Mughal loyalist scholars and nobles in Delhi appealed to Ahmad Shah Durrani to intervene and curb Maratha ascendancy.

Responding to these appeals, Durrani launched a fresh invasion of India, reaching Lahore by the end of 1759. He was joined by key Indian allies, including the Rohilla leader Najib-ud-Daula and the Nawab of Awadh Shuja-ud-Daula. Balaji Baji Rao responded by sending a large army under his cousin Sadashivrao Bhau, supported by contingents from the Holkar, Scindia, Gaekwad and Govind Pant Bundele families. The Jat ruler Suraj Mal of Bharatpur initially allied with the Marathas but later withdrew following a dispute with Bhau.

Between 1759 and 1761, the Durrani and Maratha forces clashed in several engagements with mixed outcomes. The prolonged siege of eventually left the Maratha army weakened and undersupplied. Reinforcements from Balaji Baji Rao never reached beyond the Narmada River, and on 14 January 1761, the Durrani forces decisively defeated the Marathas in the Third Battle of Panipat.

According to historian Suresh K. Sharma, Balaji Baji Rao’s preoccupation with courtly pleasures contributed to the debacle:

“It was Balaji Bajirao’s love of pleasure which was responsible for Panipat. He delayed at Paithan celebrating his second marriage until December 27th, when it was too late.”

== Death ==
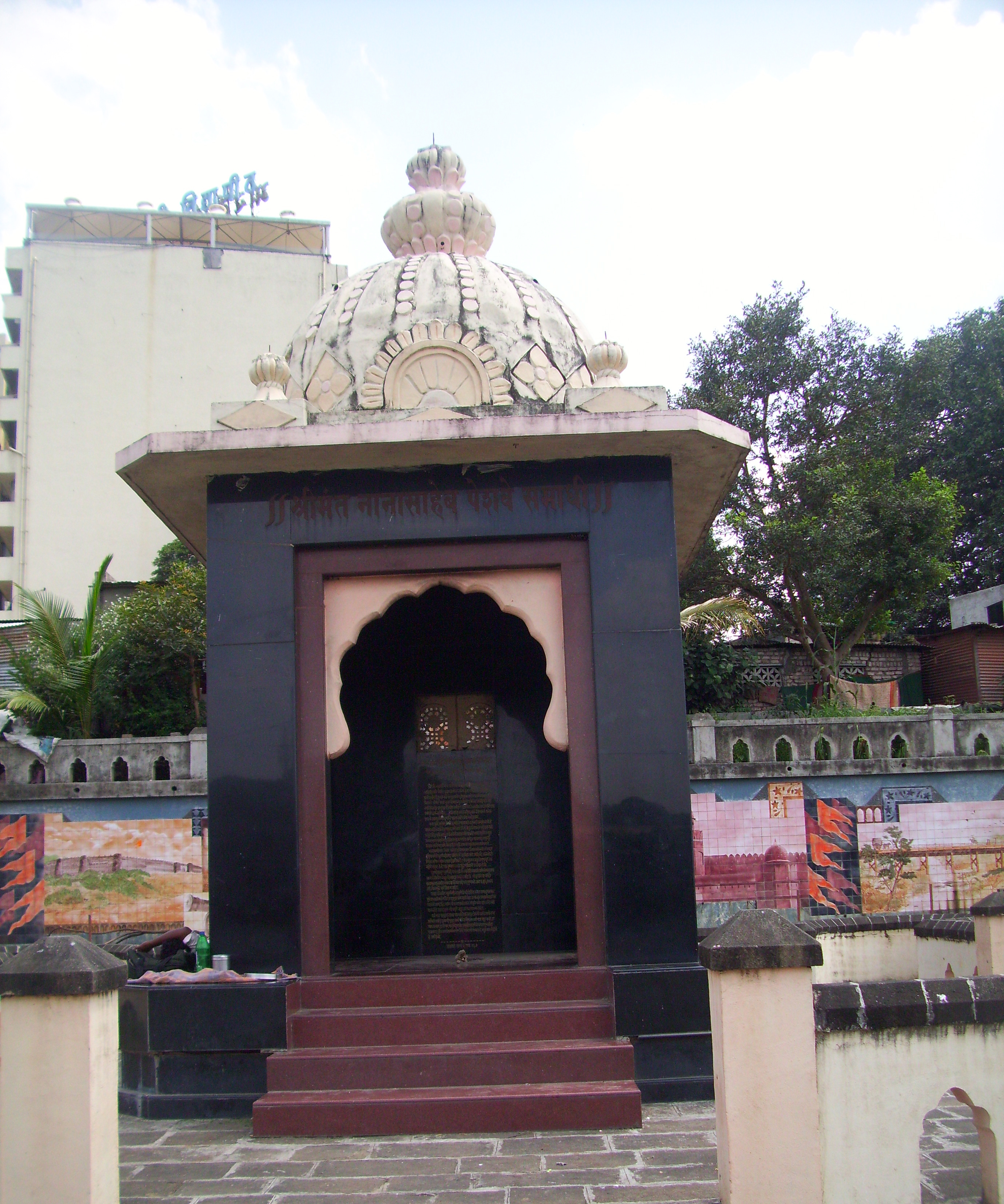
Samadhi (memorial) dedicated to Balaji Baji Rao at Pune

The defeat at Panipat proved catastrophic for the Marathas and marked a severe personal and political setback for Balaji Baji Rao. He received news of the defeat on 24 January 1761 at Bhilsa, where he was leading a reinforcement force toward the north. Among the heavy casualties were several of his key generals, as well as his own son Vishwasrao and cousin Sadashivrao Bhau.

The loss deeply affected Balaji, who fell into depression following the disaster. He died a few months later, on 23 June 1761, at Parvati Hill near Pune. He was succeeded by his younger son, Madhavrao I.

== Gallery ==
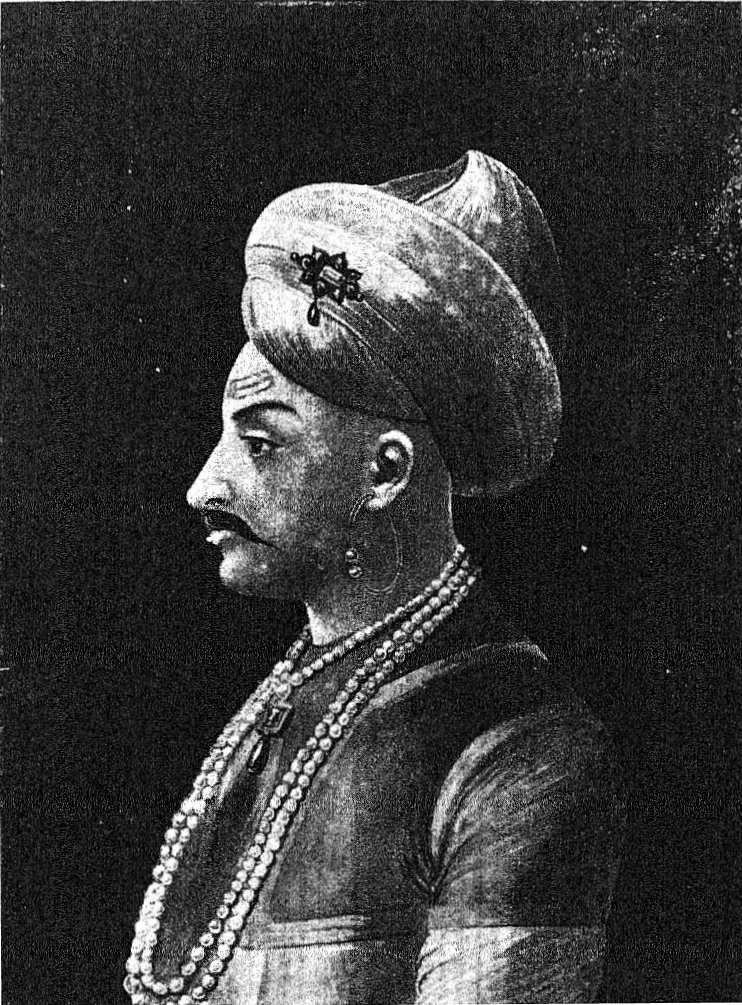
A 19th-century portrait of Balaji Baji Rao

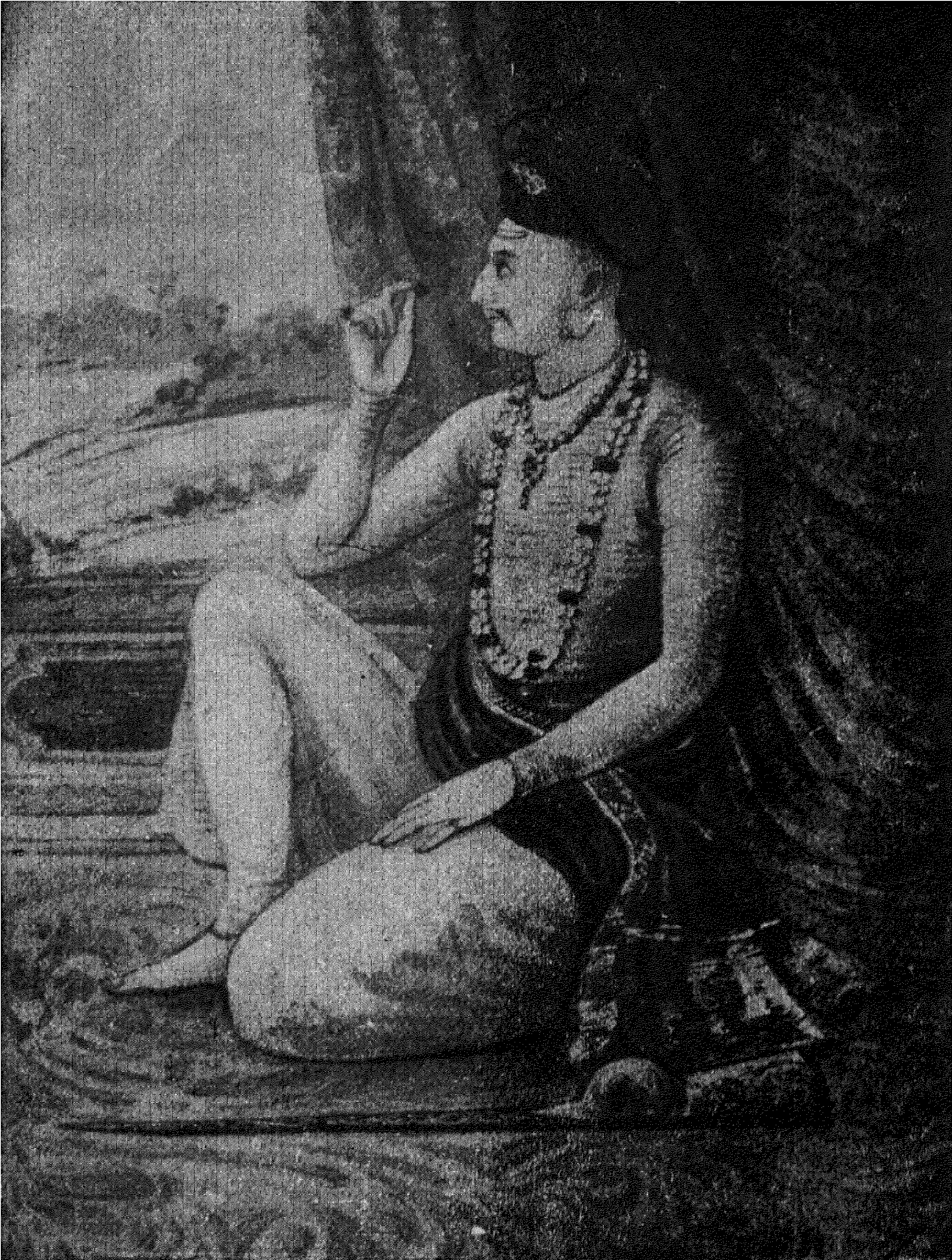
19th-century depiction of Balaji Baji Rao

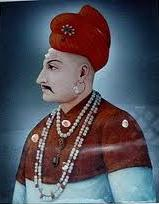
Artist impression of Balaji Baji Rao

== In popular culture ==
- In 1994 Hindi TV series The Great Maratha, Peshwa Balji Bajirao's character was portrayed by Bal Dhuri.
- In the 2014 Indian Marathi-language film, Rama Madhav, he is portrayed by Ravindra Mankani.
- In the 2015 Bollywood film Bajirao Mastani, Ayush Tandon essays the role of a young Balaji Bajirao.
- In the 2019 Bollywood film, Panipat, Peshwa Balaji Bajirao was portrayed by Mohnish Bahl.
- "The Extraordinary Epoch of Nanasaheb Peshwa" (published in 2020) a book written by Uday S. Kulkarni about the life and tenure of Nanasaheb Peshwa.
- "Dhurandhar Peshwa Nanasaheb", a Marathi novel written by Kaustubh S. Kasture on the life of Nanasaheb Peshwa.

Preceded by Baji Rao I	Peshwa; 1740–1761	Succeeded by Madhava Rao I
