= Ramachandra Baba Sukthankar =

Diwan of Ranoji Scindia in the Maratha Empire (13th-century)

Ramachandra Malhar Shenvi Sukhathankar, popularly known as Sukhathankar Ramachandra Baba Shenvi (Ramachandra Malhar), was a diwan of Ranoji Scindia in the Maratha Empire.

== Early life ==
Ramachandra Baba Sukthankar was born into the Shenvi subsect of the Goan Gaud Saraswat Brahmin family in Marcel, Goa.

== Occupation ==
Ramachandra Baba shenvi served as the teacher of Sadashivrao Bhau. During their time together in Satara, Sadashivrao Bhau received instruction from Ramchandra Baba Shenvi in various aspects of administration. Shenvi referred to Sadashivrao Bhau as a bright student. Notably, he played a crucial role in the Battle of Bagru, compelling Ishwari Singh to cede territory to his brother Madhav Singh. Ramachandra Baba was a key figure in shaping the administration of the state of Scindias, managing it efficiently.

== Reconstruction of Mahakaal Jyotirling Temple ==
The temple complex was destroyed by Iltutmish during his raid of Ujjain in 1234–35, a mosque was built in that place named vriddha or old mahakal. The Jyotirlinga was dismantled and believed to be thrown into a nearby 'Kotiteerth Kunda' (a pond neighbouring the temple) with the Jaladhari (a structure supporting the Lingam) stolen during the invasion. It was later reconstructed and revived by Maratha Diwan, Ramchandara baba shenvi by razing the mosque constructed on that place.
