= Panipat (film) =

2019 Indian film by Ashutosh Gowarikar

- Theatrical release poster
- Directed by: Ashutosh Gowariker
- Written by: Ashok Chakradhar (dialogue); Chandrashekhar Dhavalikar; Ranjeet Bahadur; Aditya Rawal; Ashutosh Gowariker
- Produced by: Sunita Gowariker; Rohit Shelatkar
- Starring: Arjun Kapoor; Sanjay Dutt; Kriti Sanon
- Narrated by: Kriti Sanon (as Parvati Bai); Ashutosh Gowariker (Climax)
- Cinematography: C. K. Muraleedharan
- Edited by: Steven Bernard
- Music by: Ajay–Atul
- Production companies: Ashutosh Gowariker Productions; Vision World Films
- Distributed by: Reliance Entertainment
- Release date: 6 December 2019
- Running time: 162 minutes
- Country: India
- Language: Hindi
- Budget: ₹90–92 crore
- Box office: est. ₹49.29 crore

Panipat is a 2019 Indian Hindi-language epic historical war film directed by Ashutosh Gowariker, who co-produced it with Sunita Gowariker, Rohit Shelatkar and Firoz Nadiadwala. The film stars Arjun Kapoor, Kriti Sanon and Sanjay Dutt in the lead roles, with Mohnish Bahl, Padmini Kolhapure, Zeenat Aman, Kunal Kapoor and Ravindra Mahajani in supporting roles. Set during the Third Battle of Panipat, the film depicts the conflict between the Maratha Empire and the forces of Afghan ruler Ahmad Shah Abdali, focusing on Maratha commander Sadashiv Rao Bhau.

The film was announced in 2017, with Gowariker developing the project as a historical epic based on the events surrounding the battle. Principal photography began in 2018 and took place primarily in Mumbai and Rajasthan. The production involved large-scale sets, period costumes and visual effects to recreate 18th-century India and the battle sequences. The soundtrack was composed by Ajay–Atul, with lyrics by Javed Akhtar.

Panipat was theatrically released in India on 6 December 2019. It received mixed reviews from critics, who praised the performances, production design, costumes and battle sequences, while criticism was directed towards its screenplay, pacing and historical liberties. The film was a commercial failure at the box office, grossing approximately ₹49 crore against a production budget of ₹92 crore. The film was nominated for several awards, including nominations at the 65th Filmfare Awards, where it received recognition for its technical and supporting performances.

== Plot ==
By 1758, the Maratha Empire has reached its height under Peshwa Balaji Baji Rao (Nana Saheb). Maratha commander Raghunath Rao defeats the Nizam of Hyderabad and recruits his artillery commander, Ibrahim Khan Gardi, into the Maratha Army. After returning to Pune, Sadashiv is appointed finance minister over the Peshwa's son Vishwas Rao, despite his reluctance.

Sadashiv discovers that Najib ad-Dawlah, the chief of Rohillakhand, owes a large amount of unpaid taxes to the Marathas. Fearing Maratha expansion, Najib seeks the assistance of Afghan ruler Ahmad Shah Abdali. When Najib subsequently kills Maratha general Dattaji Shinde, the Peshwa orders an expedition to defend Delhi and confront Abdali. Raghunath Rao refuses to lead the campaign without additional funding, so Sadashiv is appointed commander of the Maratha army, with Vishwas Rao accompanying him.

The Marathas march north and attempt to form alliances with regional rulers, including Maharaja Suraj Mal and Nawab Shuja-ud-Daulah. Their army grows substantially, but Shuja ultimately joins Abdali. After capturing Delhi, the Marathas move toward Kunjpura and defeat the Afghan forces stationed there. Abdali responds by crossing the Yamuna and cutting off the Maratha army's supply routes. With food supplies dwindling, the Marathas become increasingly weakened while Abdali's forces surround them near Panipat. Abdali and Sadashiv briefly negotiate a truce, but the talks collapse over Abdali's demands. Both armies then prepare for a decisive battle. Before the fighting, Sadashiv entrusts Malhar Rao Holkar with protecting the civilians accompanying the Maratha army, while Vishwas Rao promises to remain on his elephant for his own safety.

The Battle of Panipat begins with artillery and infantry attacks. Ibrahim Khan's artillery initially gives the Marathas an advantage, and Abdali's forces begin to retreat. However, Vishwas Rao leaves his elephant after seeing Shamsher Bahadur wounded. While protecting him, Sadashiv is unable to prevent Vishwas from being fatally shot. His death severely damages Maratha morale, and the battle turns against them. Several Maratha commanders are killed or wounded, while Ala Singh's forces unexpectedly withdraw after secretly siding with Abdali. Malhar Rao retreats with the non-combatants, while Sadashiv remains behind to fight. Seriously wounded and surrounded by Afghan soldiers, he eventually dies on the battlefield.

After returning to Pune, Parvati Bai dies from grief. Abdali sends Nana Saheb a letter acknowledging Sadashiv's bravery. Although Abdali wins the battle, he does not remain in India. Ten years later, under Peshwa Madhav Rao, Maratha commanders Mahadaji Shinde and Tukoji Rao Holkar recapture Delhi, restoring Maratha influence in northern India.

== Cast ==
The cast has been listed below:

- Arjun Kapoor as Sadashivrao Bhau
- Sanjay Dutt as Ahmad Shah Abdali
- Kriti Sanon as Parvatibai
- Zeenat Aman as Sakina Begum
- Mantra as Najib ad-Dawlah
- Mohnish Bahl as Balaji Baji Rao aka Nana Saheb
- Padmini Kolhapure as Gopikabai (Peshwinbai)
- Sahil Salathia as Shamsher Bahadur I
- Kunal Kapoor as Shuja-ud-Daula
- Fahim Fazli as Shah Barakzai
- Mir Sarwar as Imad-ul-Mulk
- Milind Gunaji as Dattaji Rao Scindia
- Abhishek Nigam as Vishwasrao
- Ravindra Mahajani as Sardar Malhar Rao Holkar
- Gashmeer Mahajani as Sardar Jankoji Shinde
- Nawab Shah as Ibrahim Khan Gardi
- Kashyap Parulekar as Raghunath Rao
- Suhasini Mulay as Radhabai, Sadashiv Rao Bhau's Grandmother
- S. M. Zaheer as Mughal Emperor Alamgir II
- Arun Bali as Ala Singh
- Manoj Bakshi as King Suraj Mal
- Paresh Shukla as Govind Pant Bundela
- Pradeep Patvardhan as Lingoji Narayan
- Krutika Deo as Radhikabai, Vishwasrao's wife
- Vinita Mahesh as Mehrambai, Shamsher Bahadur I's wife
- Archana Nipankar as Anandibai, Raghunath Rao's wife
- Shailesh Datar as Pant
- Dyanesh Wadkar as Sardar Balwantrao Mehendale
- Shyam Mashalkar as Bhanu
- Dushyant Wagh as Nana Fadnavis
- Sanjay Khapre as Mahadaji Shinde
- Rajesh Ahir as Sardar Biniwale
- Sagar Talashilkar as Sardar Raste
- Ajit Shidhaye as Shahwali Khan, wazir and commander in chief to Ahmed Shah Abdali)
- Ashutosh Gowariker as Narrator (Climax)

== Production ==
=== Development ===
Director Ashutosh Gowariker announced Panipat in March 2018 as a historical epic based on the Third Battle of Panipat of 1761. Having previously directed period films such as Jodhaa Akbar and Mohenjo Daro, Gowariker stated that historical subjects had long interested him and that the film would explore the events leading up to the battle. He developed the screenplay from historical sources relating to the conflict and enlisted historian Pandurang Balkawade as a consultant during the research process.

Gowariker later said that he was drawn to the subject because he considered the battle an important yet comparatively underrepresented episode in Indian history. He described the project as a "tragic battle story" and noted that historical defeats were as significant to portray as victories. He was also particularly interested in depicting the life of Maratha commander Sadashiv Rao Bhau, who had rarely been the focus of major Hindi-language films. During the film's promotion, Gowariker stated that authenticity was a guiding principle in the project's development and that he sought to remain as faithful as possible to historical accounts while adapting them for a feature film.

Art Director Nitin Chandrakant Desai recreated Shaniwar Wada at ND Studios, Karjat. Neeta Lulla designed the costumes. Padmini Kolhapure joined the cast in October 2018 as Gopika Bai. In June 2019, Zeenat Aman joined the cast to portray Sakina Begum.

=== Filming ===
On 30 November 2018, Gowariker and the cast tweeted a promotional poster to announce the beginning of principal photography. On 30 June 2019, Sanon wrapped up the shoot by posting pictures and notes for Gowariker and Kapoor.

== Soundtrack ==
Panipat

Soundtrack album by Ajay–Atul
- Released: 28 November 2019
- Genre: Feature film soundtrack
- Length: 16:48
- Label: Zee Music Company
- Producer: Ajay–Atul

Ajay–Atul chronology
Super 30 (2019)	Panipat (2019)	Tanhaji (2020)

Ajay–Atul were the composers of the music for the film. The songs were written by Javed Akhtar.

Track list
No.	Title	Singer(s)	Length
1.	"Mard Maratha"	Ajay–Atul, Sudesh Bhosle, Kunal Ganjawala, Swapnil Bandodkar, Padmanabh Gaikwad, Priyanka Barve	6:05
2.	"Mann Mein Shiva"	Kunal Ganjawala, Deepanshi Nagar, Padmanabh Gaikwad	5:17
3.	"Sapna Hai Sach Hai"	Abhay Jodhpurkar, Shreya Ghoshal	5:26
Total length:			16:48

== Release and reception ==
The film was released on 6 December 2019 in theatres and on 14 February 2020 on Netflix.

=== Critical reception ===
The film received mixed reviews from critics. On Rotten Tomatoes, the film scored 43% by critics. Monika Rawal Kukreja of Hindustan Times wrote "Panipat is an honest attempt at recreating the war that we only read in history books until now. It’s a tribute to the Maratha community in its truest form and even it was shorter by an hour, it could have had the same impact". The Times of India gave 3.5 out of 5 stars stating "Panipat delves into a significant chapter in history and is a war drama that lauds the unshakable bravery, courage and the strong principles of the Maratha's". India Today gave 2.5 out of 5 stars stating "Ashutosh Gowariker may not be able to do grandeur like Sanjay Leela Bhansali, but he can do war. Yet, a lacklustre cinematography and terrible CGI mars this solid attempt. It would have worked 10 years ago".

Namrata Joshi of The Hindu wrote "Gowariker may have taken liberties with history, but doesn’t play around with the form. He sticks to the tried and tested, the long and langourous and old-fashioned". Bollywood Hungama gave 3 out of 5 stars stating "Panipat throws light on an important chapter of Indian history with the battle scenes as its USP". Zee News gave 3 out of 5 stars stating "The film is a great effort by Gowariker and deserves to be watched for some impeccable performances and adrenaline-pumping action".

News18 gave 2.5 out of 5 stars stating "Panipat, a film about Maratha warrior Sadashiv Rao Bhau who staves off Afghan ruler Ahmad Shah Abdali, disappoints only because of a linear screenplay that fails to rouse dramatic emotions so important to historicals". NDTV gave 2 out of 5 stars stating "The burden on Arjun Kapoor is too heavy for him though he rises manfully to the challenge. Panipat definitely isn't Mohenjo Daro. But is that saying much? It will take three hours of your life and a whole lot of patience to sit through this laboured film". Deccan Chronicle gave 2.5 out of 5 stars stating "Directors like Gowariker do no service to the nation or their audience by twisting the truth, ignoring military, diplomatic, common sense follies and rewriting history with jingoistic fervour".

=== Box office ===
Panipat's opening day domestic collection was ₹4.12 crore. On the second day, the film collected ₹5.78 crore. On the third day, the film collected ₹7.78 crore, taking the total opening weekend collection to ₹17.68 crore.

As of 10 January 2020, with a gross of ₹40.81 crore in India and ₹8.48 crore overseas, the film has a worldwide gross collection of ₹49.29 crore.

== Controversies ==
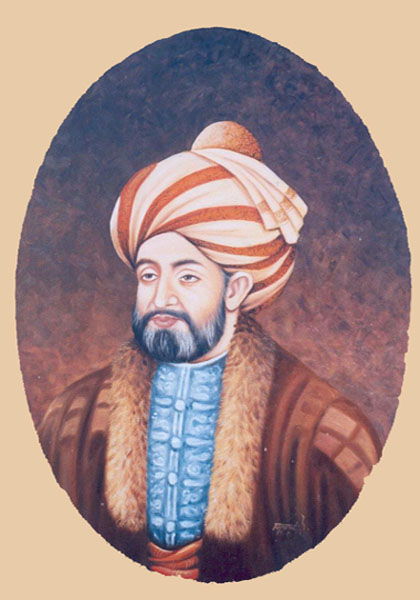
Portrait of Ahmad Shah Durrani in Afghan Costume

BBC News and Al Jazeera reported that the film received criticism from different parts of the world, especially from Afghanistan since Ahmad Shah Abdali is the national hero and the founder of modern day Afghanistan. Afghan viewers pointed that the film's portrayal of Abdali was that of an Arab, rather than an Afghan. Critics linked the rising number of Bollywood films with negative Muslim characters, such as the portrayal of Alauddin Khilji as a cruel and vicious ruler in the film Padmaavat (2018), as an attempt by the industry executives to align with India's ruling Bharatiya Janata Party, a Hindu nationalist party led by Prime Minister Narendra Modi.

The Panipat trailer depicted Ahmed Shah Durrani as a ruthless and brutal ruler and Afghans as 'battle-hardened, blood-thirsty savages'. While the film presented Marathas as "sophisticated and righteous". Consul General of Afghanistan in Mumbai, Naseem Sharifi, said that 'Afghans would not tolerate any insult to Ahmad Shah Durrani'. Afghan journalists stated that the film will create more Islamophobia and racism towards Afghans. The Telegraph India reported that films like Padmaavat (2018), Kesari (2019) and Panipat have stereotyped and vilified Afghans as brutal, cold-blooded and treacherous. Afghanistan's Ambassador to India, Tahir Qadiri, claimed that he was in contact with Indian officials and have shared the Afghan concerns with them. Ajmal Alamzai, the cultural attache at the Afghan embassy in New Delhi, claimed that he had made several unsuccessful attempts to contact the director of the film. Pajhwok Afghan News reported that the Panipat film trailer depicted the Maratha Empire as victorious in the Third Battle of Panipat despite the fact that it was Ahmad Shah Durrani, who had won the battle. Khaama Press, another Afghan newspaper, reported that some Afghan social media users have welcomed the film as reality while others criticised it and claimed that parts of history have been forged in favour of specific groups.

== See also ==
- List of Asian historical drama films
