= Parvatibai =

Second wife of Sadashivrao Bhau

Peshwin Parvati Bai
- Born: 6 April 1734; Phaltan
- Died: 23 September 1763 (aged 29); Satara
- Occupation(s): Wife and administrator
- Spouse: Sadashivrao Bhau
- Family: Kolhatkar (by birth) Bhat (by marriage)

Parvatibai (6 April 1734 – 23 September 1763) was second wife of Sadashivrao Bhau. She was from the Kolhatkar family of Pen and was married to Sadashivrao Bhau after the death of his first wife Umabai and hence became a member of the Peshwa family. She was also a trusted confidante of Shahuji. Her niece Radhikabai was married to Vishwasrao.

== Panipat Campaign ==
When the Marathas under Sadashivrao went to North India, she escorted her husband. On the way to Panipat, she performed pilgrimage at Mathura and Vrindavan, along with Nana Phadnavis and other women folks in Maratha camp. She was present in the final battle fought on 14 January 1761 and was successfully led out of the battlefield by some loyal men of Sadashivrao Bhau. She accidentally met Malharrao Holkar on her escape route, who carried her off safely to the south of river Chambal.

== Death of her Husband and aftermath ==
Her husband Sadashivrao Bhau died in the Third Battle of Panipat. For the rest of her life, she remained a widow (as she had promised her husband before the battle).

== Death ==
She saw many ups and downs in the Maratha Empire and died when Madhavrao I was in power. She died in Pune due to Pneumonia and was treated as Sati of Sadashivrao Bhau after her death. She was cremated in Pune, however, the Marathas were not in a state to erect any monument of her. Her after-death rituals were done at her hometown, Pen.

== In popular culture ==
- Parvatibai was played by Shruti Marathe in the 2014 Marathi language movie Rama Madhav
- In the 2019 Hindi film, Panipat, she was portrayed by Kriti Sanon.
- Uma Hrishikesh portrays Parvatibai in the 2019 Marathi language series Swamini
- Seema Kelkar portrays Parvatibai in the 1994 Sanjay Khan epic serial The Great Maratha
