= Bhau =

Bhau (Marathi: भाऊ) is a title used as a surname in modern times by Marathi Brahmins in the states of Goa and Maharashtra in India.

== Notable people ==
- Bhau Kadam – Indian actor and comedian from Maharashtra, India
- Anna Bhau Sathe – Indian poet, Shahir and social worker
- Sadashivrao Bhau – son of Chimaji Appa and Rakhmabai and the nephew of Peshwa Bajirao I
- Bhau Daji – Indian physician, Sanskrit scholar, and antiquary
