= Sadashivrao Bhau =

Maratha general and minister (1730–1761)

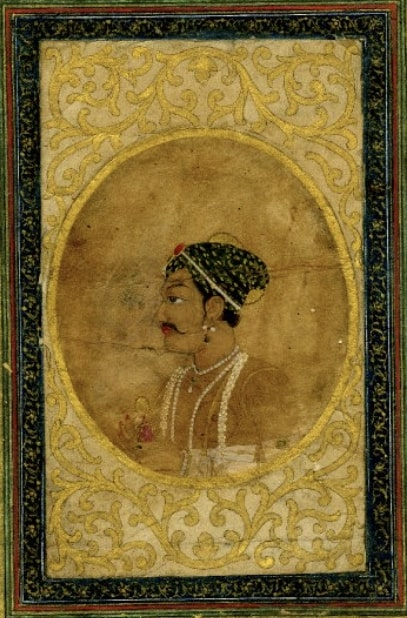
- Bust portrait, c. 1760

Amatya of the Maratha Empire
- In office 1760 – 14 January 1761
- Monarch: Rajaram II

Personal details
- Born: 4 August 1730 Pune, Maratha Empire (present-day Maharashtra, India)
- Died: 14 January 1761 (aged 30) Panipat, Maratha Empire (present-day Haryana, India)
- Spouse(s): Umabai; Parvatibai
- Relations: Baji Rao I (uncle); Vishwasrao (nephew); Madhavrao I (nephew); Narayanrao (nephew); Balaji Baji Rao (cousin); Raghunathrao (cousin); Shamsher Bahadur I (Krishna Rao) (cousin)
- Children: 2
- Parent: Chimaji Appa (father) Rakhmabai (mother)

Military service
- Allegiance: Maratha Empire
- Branch/service: Maratha Army
- Years of service: 1746–1761
- Rank: Senapati (1760 – 1761)
- Battles/wars: Raghoji's Southern Campaign; Peshwa's Expedition of Shrirangapattan; Third Battle of Panipat; Battle of Udgir; Capture of Delhi (1760); Battle of Kunjpura; Siege of Trichinopoly (1746); Capture of Sangola; Capture of Nashik; Battle of Shrirangapattan(1753); Battle of Shrirangapattan(1757); Battle of sindkhed; Capture of Janjira; Sadashivbhau Carnatic Expansion

Sadashivrao Bhau Bhatt (4 August 1730 – 14 January 1761) was the son of Chimaji Appa (younger brother of Baji Rao I) and Rakhmabai of the Pethe family, and the nephew of Baji Rao I. He held administrative responsibilities and served as a finance minister during the reign of Maratha ruler Rajaram II.

He was appointed sarsenapati (commander-in-chief) of the Maratha army and led its forces during the Third Battle of Panipat on 14 January 1761. The battle was fought against the army of Ahmad Shah Abdali and was one of the largest and bloodiest battles of the 18th century in India.

His role in the battle, both as a military commander and administrator, is remembered as a combination of organizational skill and the limitations imposed by logistical and strategic challenges.

== Early life ==
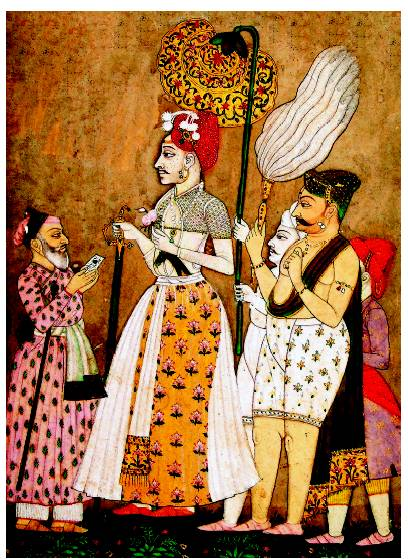
Sadashivrao Bhau with Ibrahim Khan Gardi

Sadashivrao Bhau was born in Satara into a Marathi Chitpavan Brahmin family. He was named after the Hindu deity Shiva. His father, Chimaji Appa, was the brother of Bajirao I. His mother, Rakhmabai, died when he was about a month old, and his father passed away when he was ten. He was subsequently raised by his grandmother Radhabai and aunt Kashibai. Sadashivrao received his education in Satara under Ramchandra Baba Shenvi.

Sadashivrao undertook his first military campaign in Karnataka in 1746, accompanied by his political advisers Mahadoba Purandare and Sakharam Bapu. He won his first battle at Ajra, south of Kolhapur, and captured thirty-six parganas during this campaign.

In 1760, Sadashivrao led another campaign in the Carnatic region. He conquered territories from the Nawab of Savanur and annexed the cities of Kittur, Parasgad, Gokak, Yadwad, Bagalkot, Badami, Navalgund, Umbal, Giri, Torgal, Haliyal, Harihar, and Basavapatna. During this campaign, he suppressed the revolt led by Yamaji Shivdev. He also led the Battle of Udgir, which weakened the authority of the Nizam of Hyderabad.

== Third Battle of Panipat ==
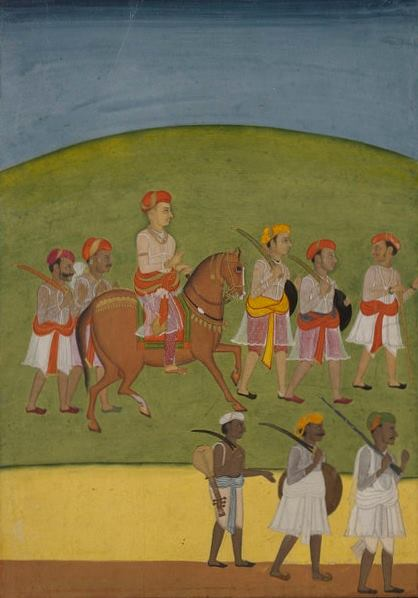
Troops led by Sadashivrao Bhau during the Third Battle of Panipat

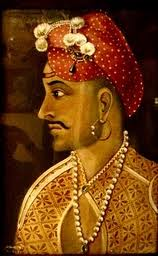
A portrait of Sadashivrao Bhau Peshwa, a part of Peshwa Memorial in Pune, India

In January 1760, news reached Peshwa Balaji Baji Rao, that Ahmad Shah Durrani, better known as Ahmad Shah Abdālī, had invaded and captured the Punjab region.

Abdali formed an alliance against the Marathas with other Rohilla chieftains, principally Najib-ul-Daula, and the Nawab of Awadh, Shuja-ud-Daula. Abdali also recruited Afghans displaced by the war.

Balaji Baji Rao, at the zenith of his power after defeating the Nizam at Udgir, appointed Sadashivrao Bhau to lead the Maratha army to Delhi. Unlike Malharrao Holkar and Raghunathrao, who were familiar with the politics and leaders of the northern regions of the Indian subcontinent, Sadashivrao lacked knowledge of the region. This lack of experience contributed to his mishandling of regional rulers and failure to form strategic alliances, which became a major reason for the Marathas’ eventual defeat.

An army of about 55,000 men set out from Patdur (modern Partur) on 14 March 1760, accompanied by roughly 200,000 non-combatants, including families and pilgrims seeking safety with the army. Forces under Holkar and Scindia joined en route.

Sadashivrao adapted the hit-and-run tactics of the Maratha cavalry to integrate French-style heavy artillery and infantry, resulting in victories such as at Udgir. However, some generals, like Holkar, were hesitant to adopt these changes fully and felt the new units were incompatible with the rest of the army. Despite these concerns and limited resources, Sadashivrao established a force of 10,000 infantry and 50 artillery pieces.

Holkar and Scindia urged Sadashivrao to form alliances with Suraj Mal, Jat ruler of Bharatpur, the Rajputs, Sikhs, Shuja-ud-Daula, and other northern leaders. The Rajputs refused to support the Marathas, citing previous interference in their succession disputes, while Suraj Mal initially distrusted Sadashivrao. Eventually, Holkar and Scindia persuaded Suraj Mal to join the Maratha forces, securing his personal safety.

Sadashivrao's overconfidence in artillery and strong personality caused him to neglect alliances with the Jats, Rajputs, and Sikhs. He also failed to heed Suraj Mal’s advice to leave civilians in Agra, resulting in severe shortages of food and supplies, which would prove critical at the Battle of Panipat.

The Maratha army reached Delhi on 1 August 1760, taking the city the next day with artillery playing a key role. Supplies were limited due to Sadashivrao's strained relations with regional rulers, forcing him to move about 110 km (68 mi) north to Karnal and capture Kunjpura fort about 10 km (6.2 mi) northeast of Karnal. Using artillery and combined cavalry-musketeer attacks, the Marathas destroyed the fort and killed the entire garrison.

The Kunjpura victory provoked Abdali to cross the swollen Yamuna River at Baghpat on 23–25 October 1760, taking Marathas by surprise while they were preoccupied with sacking Kunjpura.

The Marathas set up defenses near Panipat but were gradually encircled. On 26 October, Abdali’s forces clashed with the Maratha vanguard near Samalkha, leading to successive skirmishes and the killing of Maratha officers such as Govind Pant Bundele. The Afghan forces effectively cut off Maratha supply lines.

By November 1760, Abdali’s army of 45,000 blocked the Marathas’ access south to Delhi. The ensuing two-month siege led to severe food shortages in the Maratha camp, which included roughly 100,000 non-combatants. By late December 1760 or early January 1761, famine struck the camp, and many civilians and livestock died.

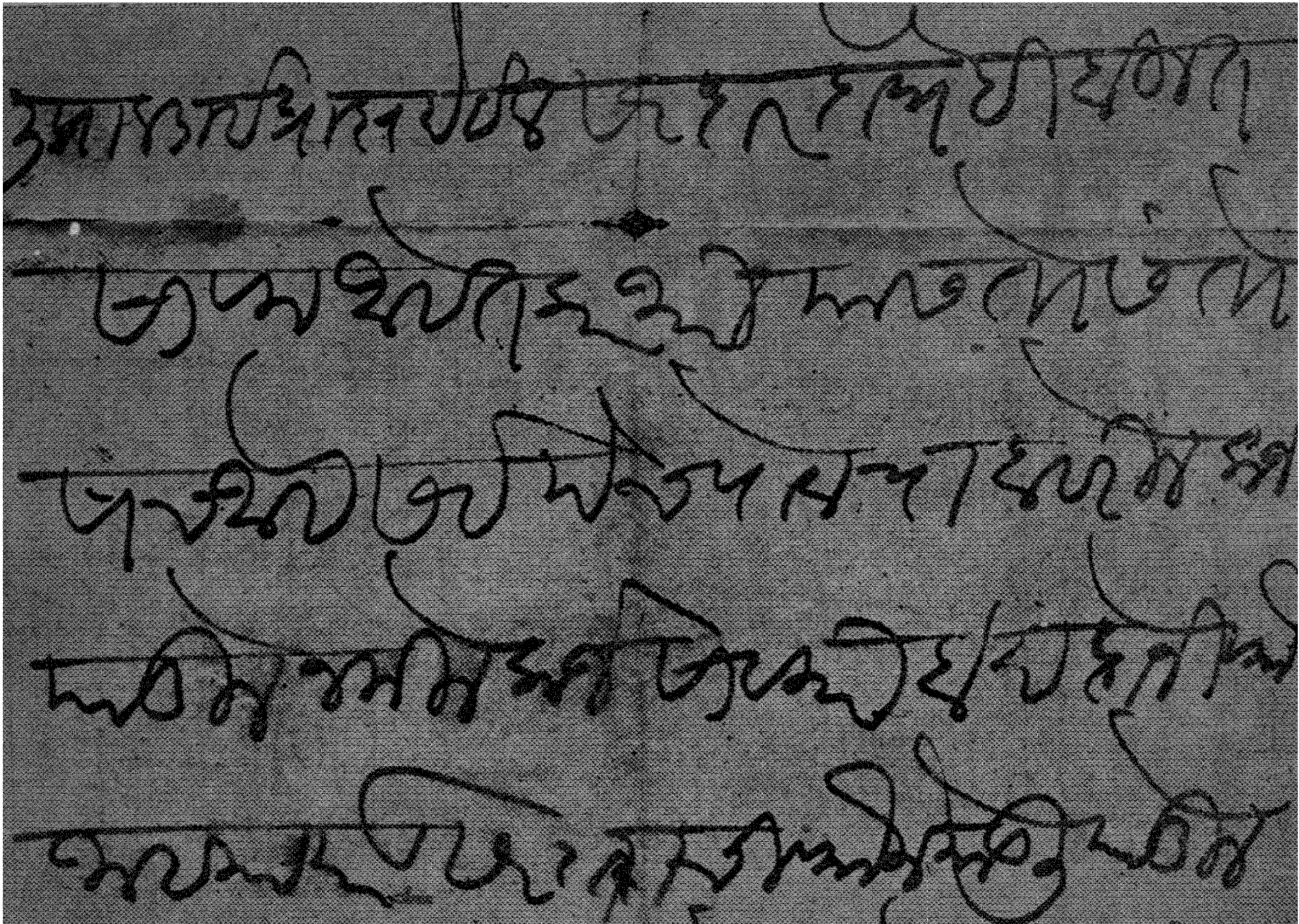
Letter written by Sadashivrao Bhau after the Third Battle of Panipat

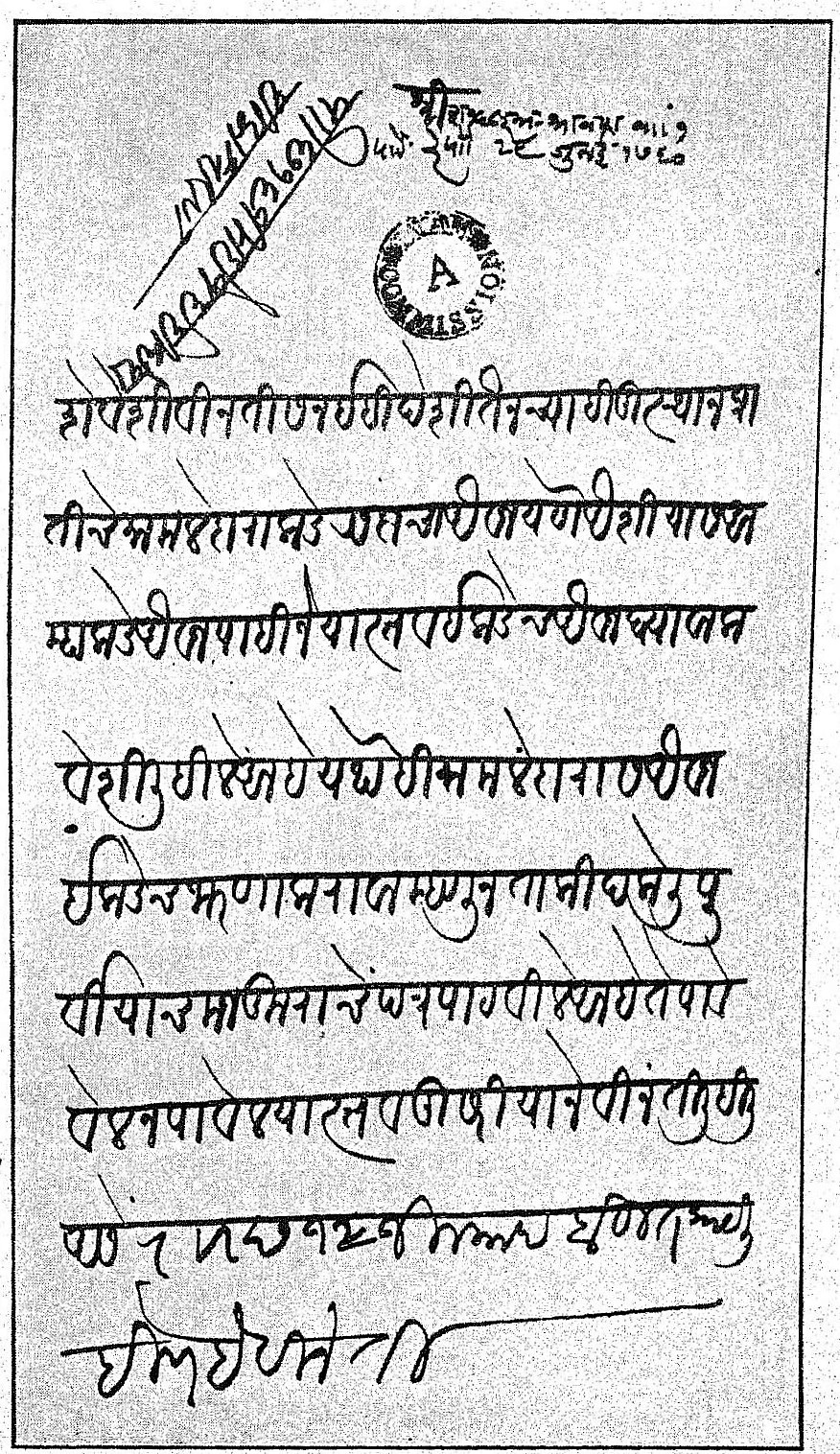
Facsimile of the handwriting of Nana Phadnavis and Sadashivrao Bhau

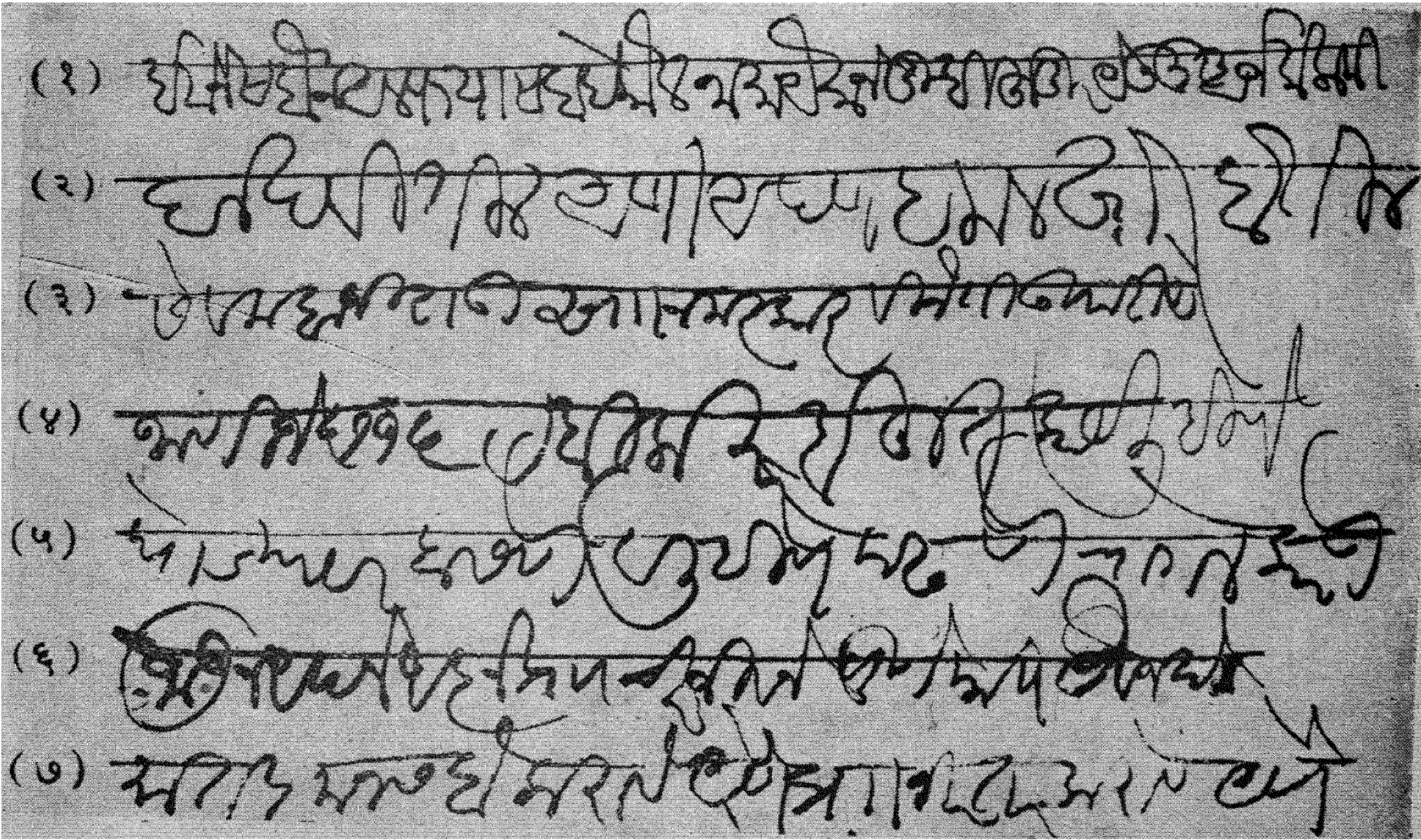
Writings of the Marathas, 5th line written by Sadashivrao Bhau

On 14 January 1761, on the occasion of the Makar Sankranti festival, the Marathas attempted to break the siege. Initial progress was made, but the death of Vishwasrao, Sadashivrao's nephew and heir to Balaji Baji Rao, demoralized the army. Sadashivrao and key generals like Jankoji Scindia were surrounded, while Malhar Rao Holkar escaped. Despite careful planning to use artillery first and cavalry later, coordination failures among Maratha generals contributed to the defeat. Sadashivrao died in battle along with his close commanders, and remaining civilians were massacred.

== Death ==
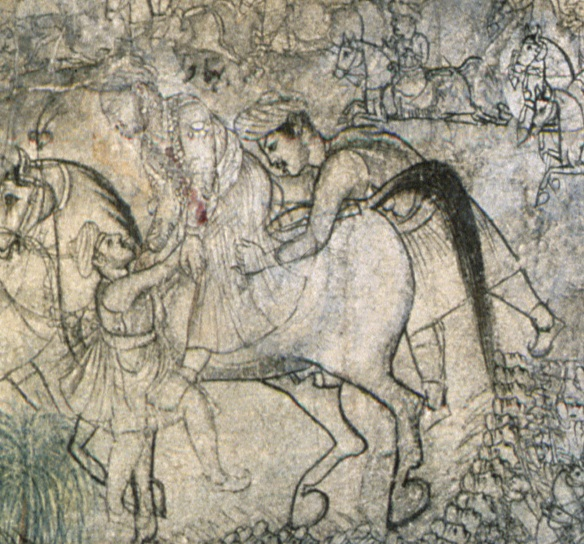
Sadashivrao Bhau wounded in battle

Following the death of his nephew, Vishwasrao, around 2 p.m. on 14 January 1761, Sadashivrao reportedly mounted a horse and charged into the enemy lines, leaving his elephant’s howdah empty. This apparently caused confusion among the Maratha troops, some of whom believed their commander had fallen, further lowering morale.

Sadashivrao continued to fight despite being surrounded and heavily injured. Contemporary accounts suggest he died in combat, although sources differ on the fate of his body. Some records state that his headless body was recovered three days later and identified by Maratha officials present in the camp, while other accounts indicate that his body was never definitively found amid the battlefield chaos.

These discrepancies reflect the extreme disorder and high casualties during the battle, which left thousands of soldiers and civilians dead, making precise identification difficult. Sadashivrao's death marked a pivotal moment in the battle, leading to the collapse of the Maratha forces and the eventual victory of Ahmad Shah Durrani’s army.

== Establishment of artillery units ==
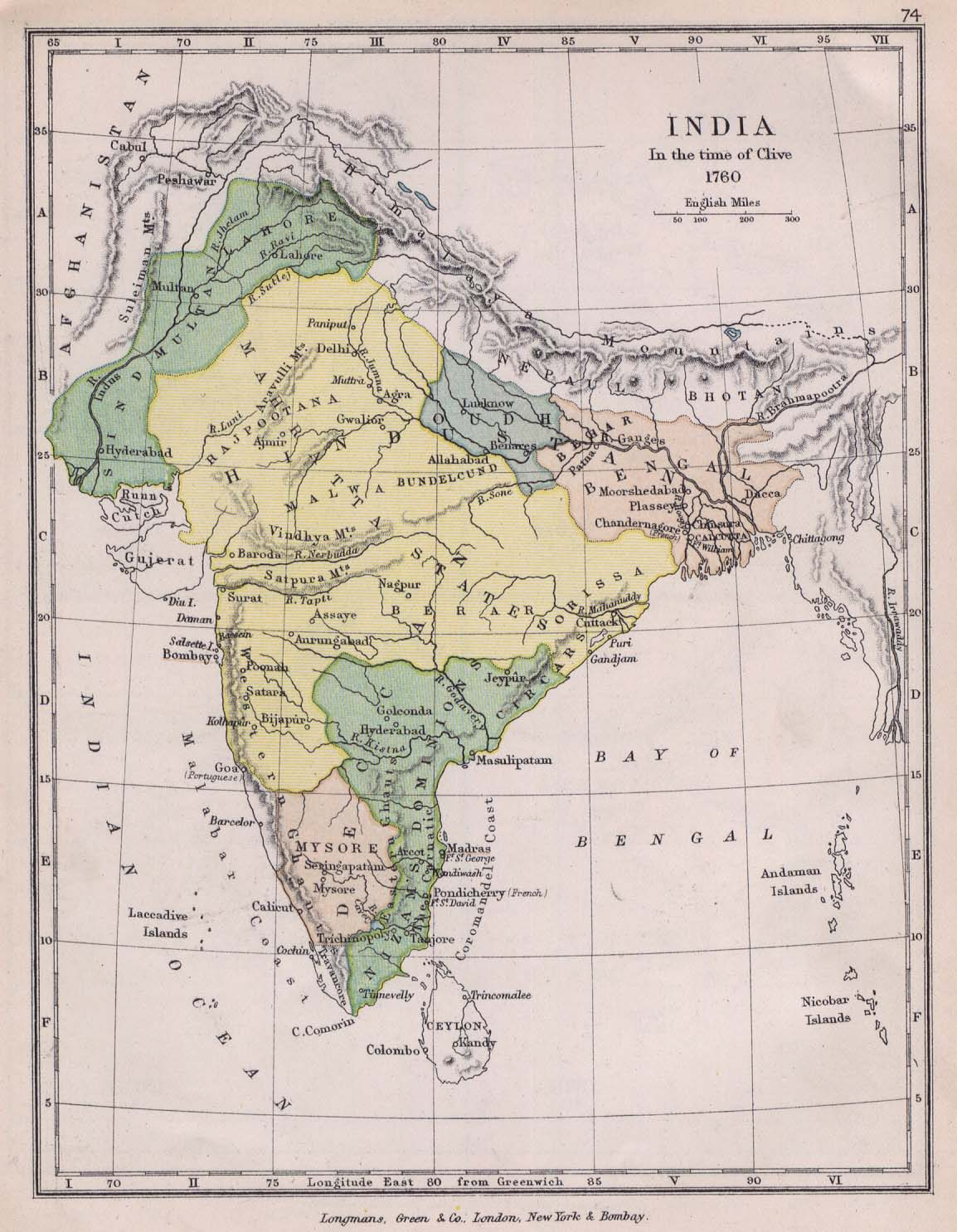
Maratha Confederacy at its zenith in 1760 (yellow areas)

While observing various battles, Sadashivrao Bhau recognized the effectiveness of artillery and light guns as used by the British and began incorporating similar units into the Maratha army under Balaji Baji Rao. In 1760, he enlisted the services of Ibrahim Khan Gardi, a former officer in the Nizam’s army, who brought with him 2,500 trained soldiers and fifteen cannons. Bhau also employed European mercenaries, many of whom had previously served under Tulaji Angre before his defeat. Among them was an engineer named Le Corbosier, noted for his expertise in foundry work and explosives. Within two years, the Maratha infantry-artillery division had grown to 10,000 men and 56 guns, significantly strengthening the army’s firepower.

== Personal life ==
Sadashivrao Bhau's first wife, Umabai, gave birth to two sons who died around 1750. He later married Parvatibai, who accompanied Sadashivrao Bhau during the Third Battle of Panipat and helped as an accessory in the campaign. Parvatibai also embarked on a pilgrimage to Mathura and Vrindavan along with Nana Fadnavis and some women from the Maratha camp. After the news of Sadashivrao’s death, Parvatibai refused to accept the conventional life of widowhood and continued to live independently.

Around 1770, an individual had reportedly appeared in Pune claiming to be Sadashivrao Bhau. He was soon revealed as a fraud and became popularly known as “Totayaa” (तोतया), meaning impostor.

The Sadashiv Peth area of Pune is named in his honor.

== In popular culture ==
- In 1994 Hindi TV series The Great Maratha, Sadashivrao's character was portrayed by Pankaj Dheer.
- In 2014 Marathi film Rama Madhav, he was portrayed by Amol Kolhe.
- In 2019 Hindi film Panipat, he was portrayed by Arjun Kapoor.
- In 2019 Marathi TV series Swamini, he was portrayed by Abhishek Rahalkar.
- Sakalrajkaryadhurandhar Sadashivraobhau, book by Kaustubh Kasture in Marathi.

== See also ==
- Bhau
- Maratha Empire
- Peshwe
- Bhat family
- Maratha emperors
