= Parvati Temple, Odisha =

Parvati Temple

Religion
- Affiliation: Hinduism
- District: Bhubaneswar
- Deity: Goddess Parvati

Location
- Location: Bhubaneswar
- State: Odisha
- Country: India
- Interactive map of Parvati Temple

The Parvati Temple is a Hindu temple located in Bhubaneswar, Odisha, India.

== Location ==
The temple is located within the Orissa Municipal Corporation Hospital compound, Sriram Nagar, Old Town, Bhubaneswar. The east-facing temple, whose enshrined deity is the Goddess Parvatti, has been operational since construction.

Another significant Hindu place of worship, the Lingaraja temple, is nearby.

== Ownership and maintenance ==
The privately owned temple is maintained and cared for by the Orissa Municipal Corporation Hospital.

== History ==
Analysis of the materials used to construct the Parvatti temple suggest it was built in the 14th century. Architectural features are typical of South Indian temple complexes constructed in the 14th century.

== Architecture ==
The Parvatti temple was built in the Kalingan style, with grey sandstone using a dry masonry construction technique. The temple typology, pidha deul, contains significant decorative features including doorjambs measuring 1.74 by 0.78 metres (5.7 ft × 2.6 ft).

The temple, which stands on a pista, has a vimana and a front porch. The vimana has typical Dravidian features, including bada, gandi and mastaka. The base of the pabhaga is constructed of five moulds including khura, kumbha, pata, kani and basanta. The gandi has seven receding tiers that are separated by two potalas. The lower potala has four tiers and the upper potala has three tiers. The raha niches are decorated with talagarbhika of a typical khakhara style, complemented by three plain vertical bands. The tala jangha and upara jangha are decorated with khakhara mundi and pidha mundi.

== Significance ==
Significant Hindu rituals including Sankranti, Sivaratri, Durgapuja, Kalipuga and Diwali are observed at the temple.
