= Yadwad =

- Village
- Location in Karnataka, India Yadwad (India)
- Coordinates: 16.24°N 75.18°E
- Country: India
- State: Karnataka
- District: Belgaum
- Talukas: Mudalagi

Government
  - Type: Panchayat raj

Population (2011)
  - Total: 9,991

Languages
  - Official: Kannada
- Time zone: UTC+5:30 (IST)
- PIN: 591136
- Telephone code: 08334
- Vehicle registration: KA 49
- Nearest city: Mudhol
- Lok Sabha constituency: Belgaum
- Vidhan Sabha constituency: Arabhavi constituency
- Climate: Dry weather during summer with low Humidity, Moderately rains in monsoon season, in winter season temperature will be less than 20 degrees in night (Köppen)

Yadwad is a village in the southern state of Karnataka, India. It is located in the Gokak taluk of Belagavi district in Karnataka.

== Demographics ==
In 2020 India census, Yadwad had a population of 19231 with 18232 males and 999 females.

== See also ==
- Belgaum
- Districts of Karnataka
