= Vishwasrao =

Eldest son of Balaji Bajirao (1742–1761)

Shrimant Vishwasrao Bhat
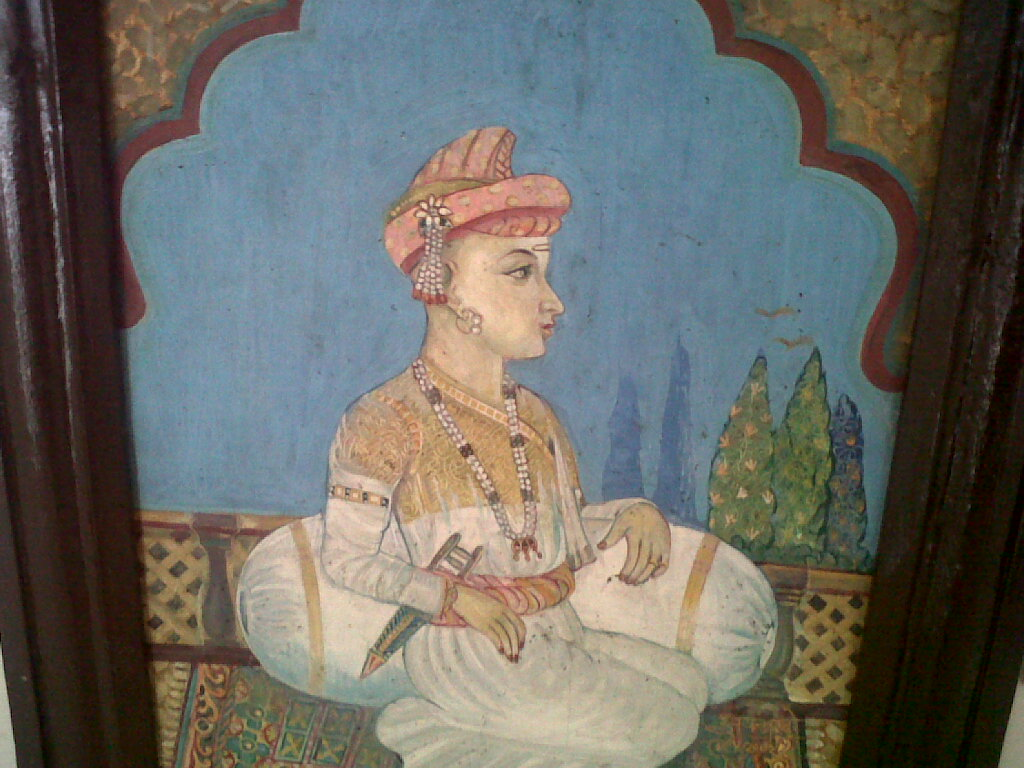
- Portrait of Vishwasrao Bhat at Peshwa Memorial, Pune

Heir apparent to the throne of the Peshwa of the Maratha Empire
- In office 1751 – 14 January 1761
- Monarch: Rajaram II of Satara
- Prime Minister: Balaji Baji Rao
- Leader: Sadashivrao Bhau

Personal details
- Born: 27 July 1742 Shaniwar Wada, Pune, Maratha Empire
- Died: 14 January 1761 (aged 18) Panipat, Maratha Empire
- Spouse: Lakshmibai (maiden name: Durgabai Dikshit-Patwardhan)
- Relations: Madhavrao I (brother); Narayanrao (brother); Sadashivrao Bhau (uncle); Raghunathrao (uncle); Shamsher Bahadur I (uncle) Baji Rao I (grandfather) Kashibai (grandmother)
- Parent(s): Balaji Baji Rao (father); Gopikabai (mother)

Military service
- Allegiance: Maratha Empire
- Battles/wars: See list: Sindhkhed (1757); Afghan–Maratha War; Delhi (1760); Kunjpura (1760); Panipat (1761)

Vishwasrao Bhat (27 July 1742 – 14 January 1761) was the eldest son and heir of Peshwa Balaji Baji Rao of the Maratha Empire. From an early age, he was trained in administration and military strategy, reflecting the Peshwa tradition of preparing the heir-apparent for leadership. He actively participated in Maratha military campaigns in the northern regions of the Indian subcontinent, including the Battle of Udgir and conflicts against the Nizam of Hyderabad.

Vishwasrao is most notably remembered for his role in the Third Battle of Panipat (1761), where he fought on the front lines and was killed during the engagement. His death represented a significant blow to Maratha morale and leadership, as he was the designated successor to the Peshwa, and it preceded the eventual defeat of Maratha forces in the battle. Vishwasrao is commemorated in historical accounts for his bravery, leadership potential, and the personal sacrifice he made during one of the most consequential conflicts in 18th-century India.

== Early life ==
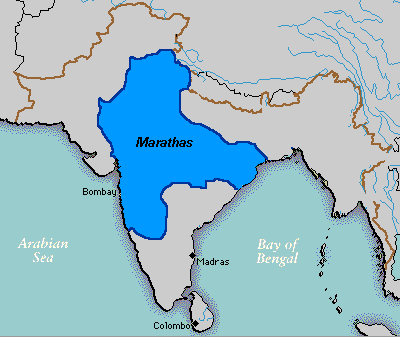
Maratha Confederacy at its zenith in 1760 (blue area) stretched from the Deccan into present-day Pakistan. The Maratha administration discussed ending the Mughal Empire and placing Vishwasrao on the Mughal imperial throne in Delhi

Vishwasrao was born at Supe, the Jagir of Shahaji, near Pune. He is said to have inherited the appearance of his grandfather Baji Rao I, and reportedly had blue eyes. Historian Govind Sakharam Sardesai wrote that there was none as fine-looking in the Peshwa lineage as Vishwasrao. Raghunath Yadav, author of one of the Panipat Bakhar, stated, "पुरुषात देखणा विश्वासराव" ("The one most handsome among all men [was] Vishwasrao").

From the age of eight, Vishwasrao received training in administration and warfare. Records in the Peshwa Daftar and letters of Balaji Baji Rao indicate that he regularly practiced kushti (wrestling) with local champions at the "akhada" (gym) of the Peshwas. He was regarded as a skilled swordsman and archer. According to writer Kaustubh Kasture in his book Sakalraj Karya Dhurandar Sadashivrao Bhausaheb, his paternal uncle Sadashivrao Bhau ensured that Vishwasrao received military training. Some sources note that Peshwa Balaji Baji Rao introduced regular army drills and improved the quality of armour in the Maratha army.

Vishwasrao married Lakshmibai, the daughter of Hari Balkrushn Dikshit-Patwardhan, on 2 May 1750. His second wife was Radhikabai

He participated in a series of campaigns to expand Maratha influence in northern Indian subcontinent. Some sources claim that he was involved in the assassination of the Mughal emperor Alamgir II, after which he reportedly attempted to assert Maratha authority in Delhi.

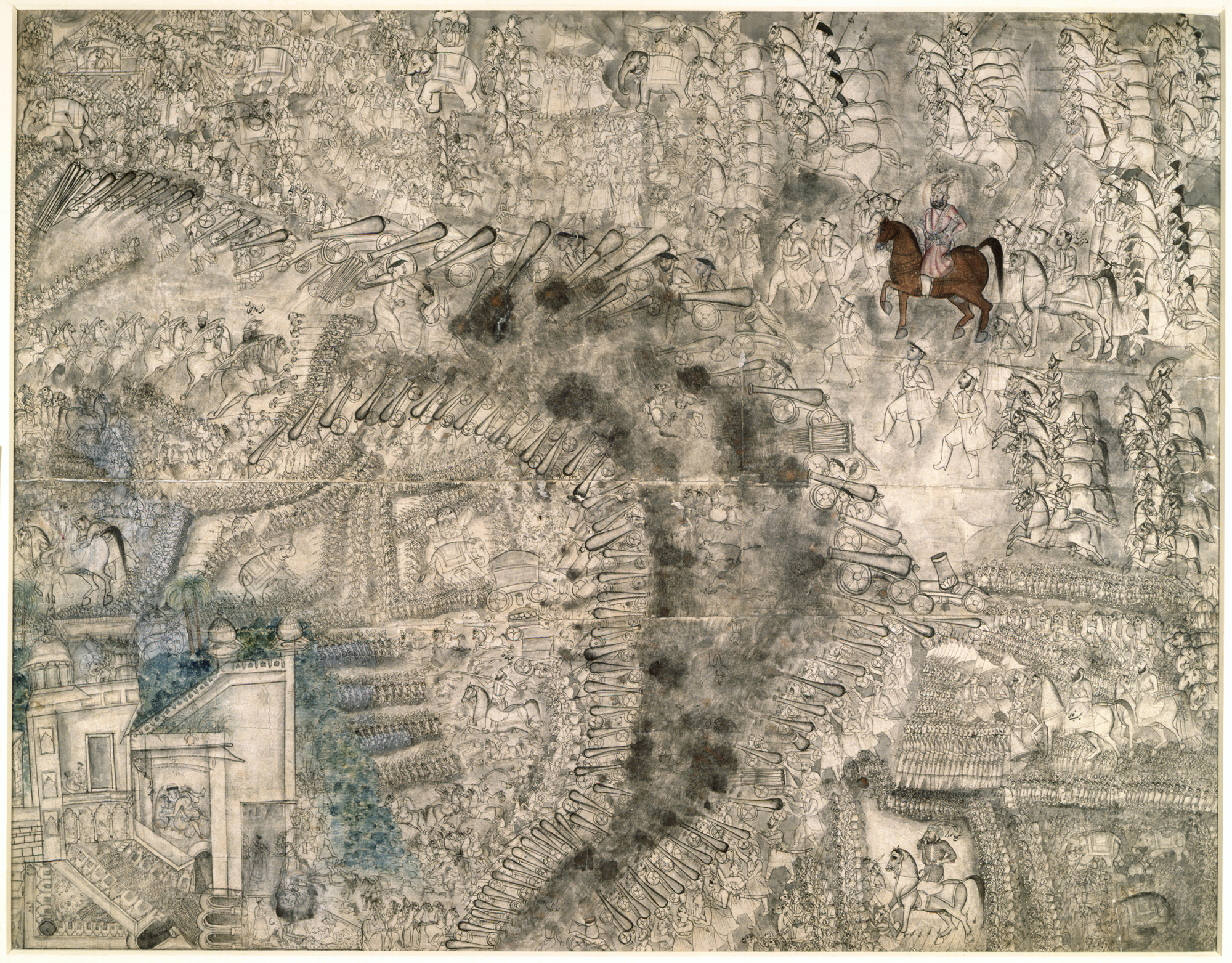
Ahmad Shah Durrani and his coalition defeated the Maratha Confederacy during the Third Battle of Panipat, and restored the Mughal Empire to Shah Alam II

== Military career and death ==
Vishwasrao was first exposed to actual warfare in a battle at Sindkheda against the Nizam of Hyderabad in 1756. During the Battle of Udgir, he established himself as a valorous Maratha leader.

He served as the nominal commander of the Maratha forces and acted as the Peshwa's representative during the Third Battle of Panipat under the guidance of his uncle Sadashivrao Bhau. At that time, the Maratha Empire controlled about two-thirds of the Indian subcontinent, encompassing areas of present-day India and Pakistan.

On the final day of the battle, during the period of the most intense fighting (approximately 01:00–02:30 pm), Vishwasrao was first struck by an arrow that injured his shoulder and was subsequently shot in the head while lying down. According to contemporary Afghan sources, the fatal shot was likely fired by a Pashtun officer, possibly Bahadar Khan Tarin. He died fighting on the front lines.

According to British historian Grant Duff, upon hearing of Vishwasrao's death, Malharrao Holkar withdrew from the battlefield with approximately 10,000 soldiers and several sardars, including prominent leaders such as Damaji Gaekwad. Holkar then proceeded to Delhi and advised other notable figures to vacate the city.

== In popular culture ==
- In the 1994 Hindi TV series The Great Maratha, Vishwasrao's character was portrayed by Sanjay Sharma.
- In the 2019 film Panipat, Vishwasrao's character was portrayed by Abhishek Nigam.
- In the 2019 Marathi TV series Swamini, his character was portrayed by Sujit Deshpande.

== See also ==
- Maratha Empire
- Bhat family
- Maratha emperors
- 18th century
