= Parvati Hill =

Geographic feature in Pune, India

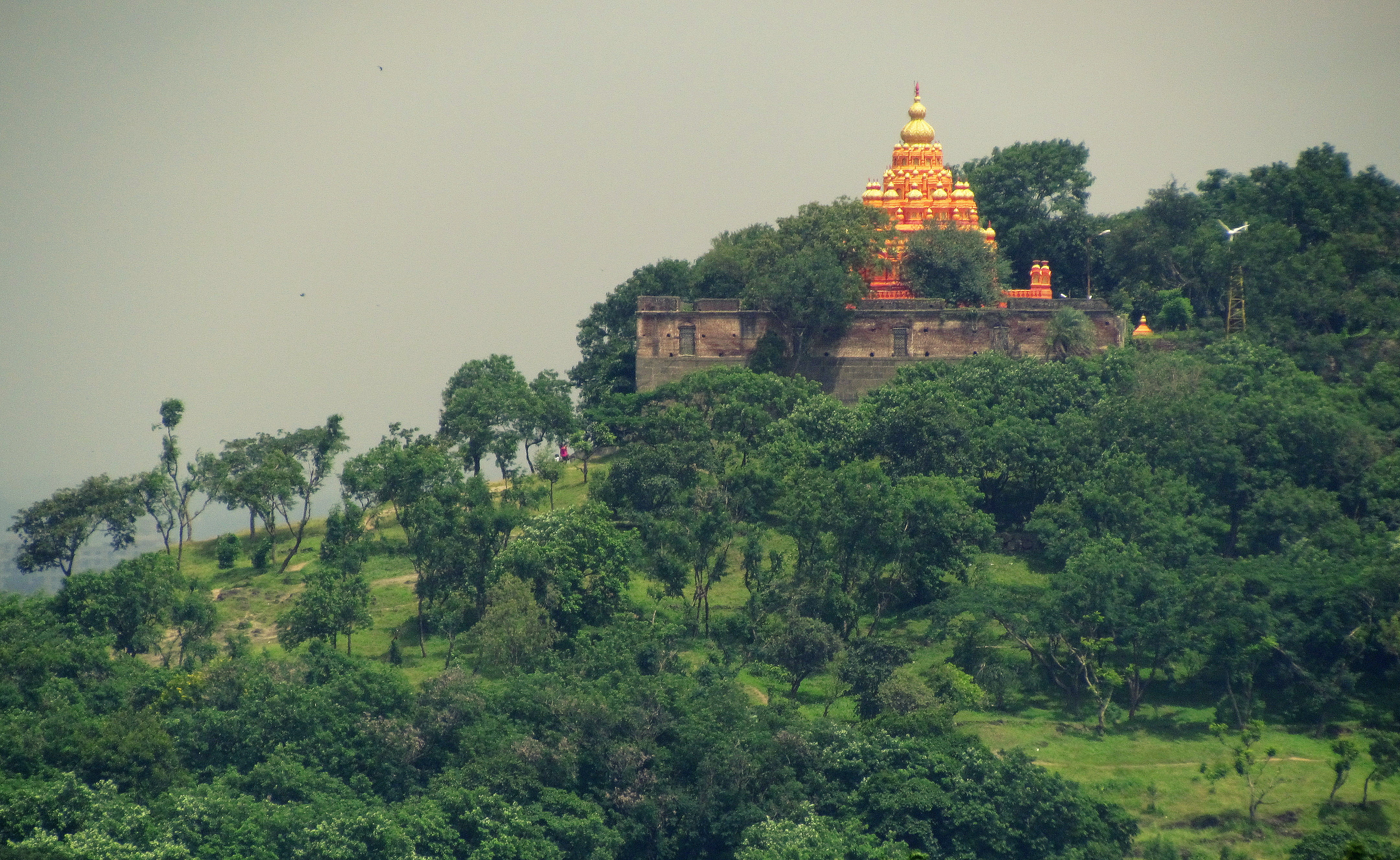
- Parvati Hill

Highest point
- Elevation: 2,100 ft (640 m)
- Coordinates: 18°29′50″N 73°50′48″E

Geography
- Location within Maharashtra
- Location: Pune, Maharashtra, India
- Parent range: Western Ghats

Climbing
- Easiest route: The hill has 103 steps, which is the way to the top of the hill.

Parvati Hill is a hillock in Pune, India. The hillock rises to 2,100 feet (640 m) above sea level. Atop the hillock is the Parvati Temple, one of the most scenic locations in Pune. The temple is the oldest heritage structure in Pune and was built during the rule of the Peshwa dynasty. For visitors, Parvati Hill is also an observation point that offers a panoramic view of Pune. It is the second highest point in Pune (after Vetal Hill). The hill has 108 steps (considered a holy number in Hinduism) leading to the top of the hill where the temple is situated. The hill was owned by the Patil named Taware. Peshwa purchased the hill to build a temple of Shiva. The Devi temple was believed to be of Taware's kulswami whose angara was able to cure a leg ailment of Kashibai, mother of Peshwa Balaji Baji Rao. Thereafter, the Peshwa built a temple complex there.

The main temple, Devdeveshwara, is made of blackstone. It was completed under Balaji Baji Rao in 1749, and a gold pinnacle was added to the temple in 1760. Other temples are dedicated to Vitthal and Rukmini, Vishnu, and Kartikeya.

== Temples ==
Parvati Hill has 5 temples atop it:

- Devdeveshwar temple (Shiva and Parvati)
- Kartikeya Temple
- Vishnu Temple
- Vitthal Temple
- Rama Temple

Along with other temples of Surya (the sun) and Bhawani mandir The temples open at 5:00 am and close at 10:00 pm.

== Other structures ==
Besides the temple, the Peshwa Museum is situated there. The museum houses the weaponry, coins, utensils, wooden furniture, modes of transport (palanquin) and gifts acquired from the times of the Peshwas.

The samadhi of Balaji Baji Rao is also located here, where he spent the last moment of his life.

The Parvati water tank supplies water to the half of the city of Pune.

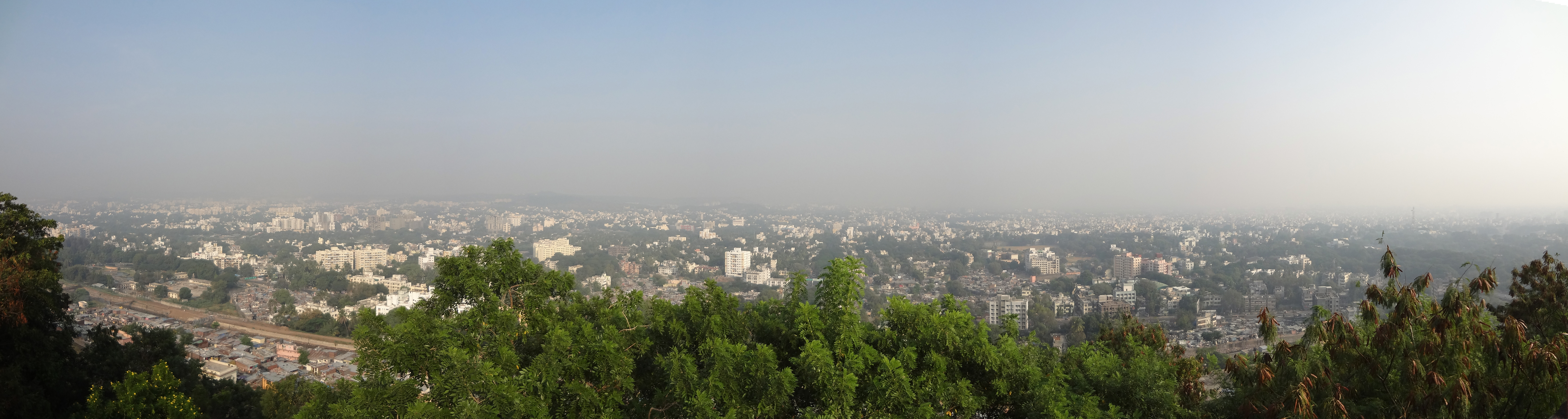
Panorama of Pune city from Parvati hill

Half way up the hill, on the south-eastern side, there is an old Buddhist cave. Though unfinished, it is believed to be contemporary with the Pataleshwar Caves.
