= Narayanrao =

Narayanrao is a name. People with the name include:

- Narayan Rao
- K. V. L. Narayan Rao
- B. Narayan Rao
- Mohan Narayan Rao Samant
- Narayan Rao Tarale
- C. R. Narayan Rao
- Narayanrao Vyas
- Dasari narayanrao
- Mangesh Narayanrao Kale
- Pratap Narayanrao Sonawane
- Narayanrao Krishnarao Shejwalkar
- Narayanrao Rajhans
- Ramrao Narayanrao Yadav
- Ganpatrao Narayanrao Madiman
- Narayanrao Bodas
- Narayanrao Uttamrao Deshmukh
- Bhavani Narayanrao Krishnamurti Sharma
- B. Narayanrao

== See also ==
- Assassination of Narayan Rao
- National Law School of India University#Narayan Rao Melgiri Memorial National Law Library
- Anandibai#Assassination of Narayanrao
- Raghunath Rao#Assassination of Peshwa Narayanrao
- Sumer Singh Gardi#Assassination of Narayanrao
