= Assassination of Narayan Rao =

1773 murder in Shaniwar Wada, India

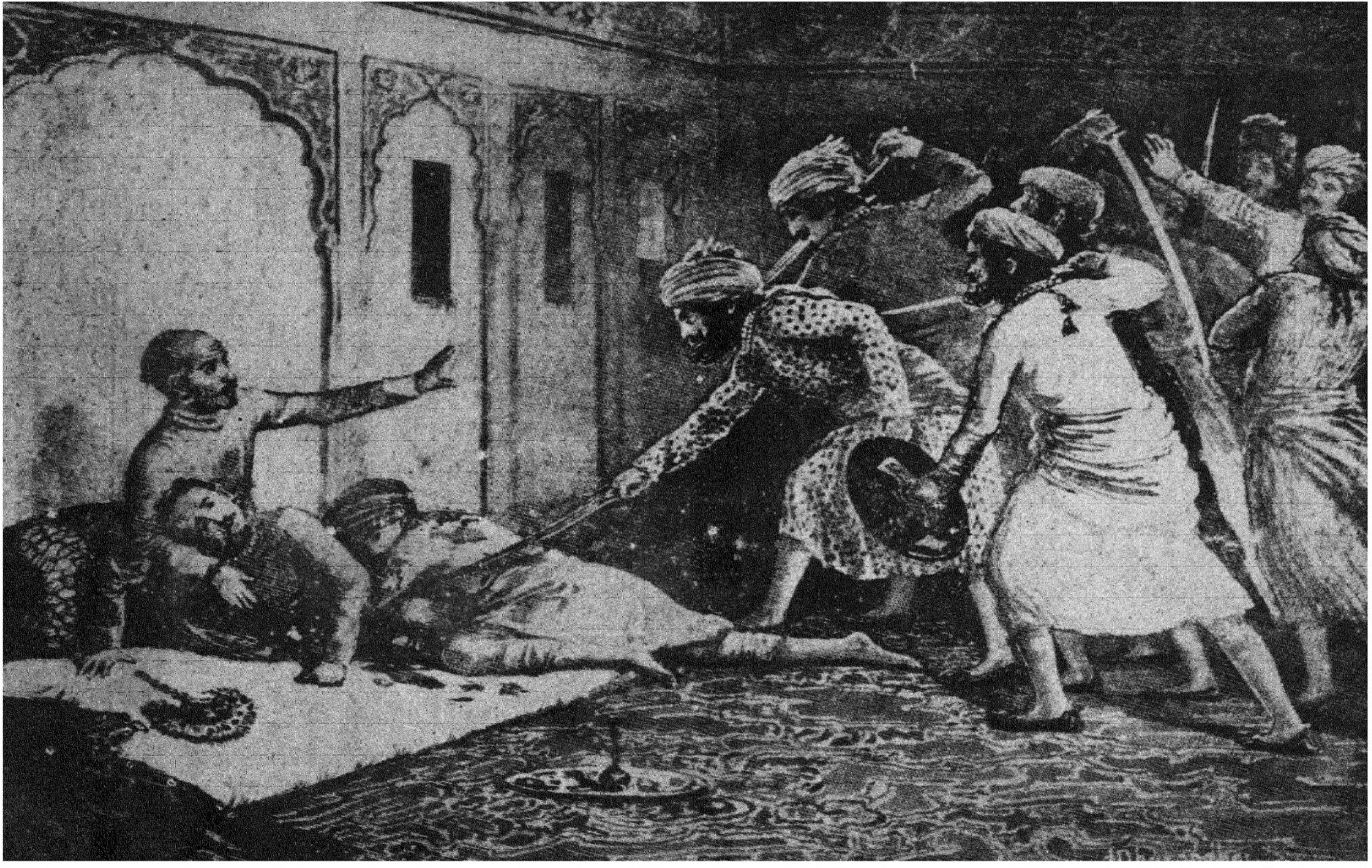
- 1922 illustration of the assassination
- Location: Shaniwar Wada, Pune, Maratha Confederacy (modern day Maharashtra, India)
- Date: 30 August 1773, 253 years ago 1:00 pm (Local mean time)
- Target: Narayan Rao
- Attack type: Assassination
- Deaths: 11 (including 7 Brahmins, 2 servants, 2 maids); 1 Cow
- Perpetrators: Raghunath Rao; Anandibai
- Motive: Right to Succession
- Charges: Death (escaped by fleeing)
- Verdict: guilty
- Convictions: Murder

The Assassination of Narayan Rao occurred on 30 August 1773, when the 18 year old Peshwa of the Maratha Confederacy Narayan Rao, was assassinated. This plot was carried out During the Ganesh Chaturthi Festival that took place from 21 to 31 August. This was plotted by his uncle Raghunath Rao and his wife Anandibai. They used members of the Kalbelia tribe as assassins. Raghunath Rao was the next in line for the throne, at the time of Narayan Rao's death. Narayan Rao and his servant Chapaji Tilekar were both killed. A total of eleven people had been killed in the palace, seven of them were Brahmins, two servants, two maids. One cow was also killed.

== Background ==
=== Reign of Narayan Rao ===
Narayanrao Bhat was born 10 August 1755. He was the third and youngest son of Peshwa Balaji Baji Rao (also known as Nana Saheb) and his wife Gopikabai. He received a conventional education in reading, writing, and arithmetic and possessed a functional understanding of Sanskrit scriptures. He was married to Gangabai Sathe on 18 April 1763 before his eighth birthday. He was very close to Parvatibai, the widow of Sadashivrao, who took him under her care to lessen her sorrows after her husband's death. His eldest brother Vishwasrao, heir to the title of the Peshwa, died in the Battle of Panipat in 1761 along with Sadashivrao. His father died a few months later and his elder brother Madhavrao took over as Peshwa.

Before his death, Peshwa Madhavrao conducted a court session in which the issue of ascension was discussed at length and at the end of which, in the presence of the family deity, he nominated his younger brother Narayanrao as the next Peshwa. He counselled Naraynrao to conduct his administration by the advice of Sakharam Bapu and Nana Padnavis. Raghunathrao, the uncle of both Madhavrao and Narayanrao, didn't have the courage to openly oppose the nomination of Narayanrao in front of the dying Peshwa and so he apparently acquiesced to the arrangement. The Peshwa had also ordered in writing that Raghunathrao was to continue his confinement so as to prevent him from engaging in mischief. Raghunathrao attempted an escape shortly before the Peshwa's death but was immediately caught and put back into confinement.

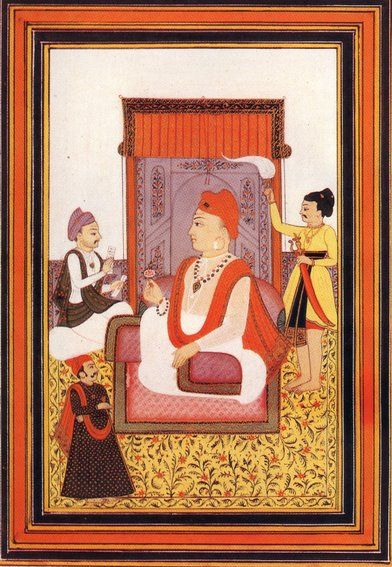
Portrait of Peshwa Narayan Rao aged 17-18

== Confinement of Raghunathrao ==
=== First attempt to escape ===
Narayanrao's relationship with his uncle Raghunathrao was cordial at the beginning. When Raghunathrao's daughter Durgabai was about to get married, Narayanrao made the arrangements for the marriage which took place on 7 February 1773. But later when Narayanrao was at Nashik, Raghunathrao tried to take advantage of the Peshwa's absence and plotted his escape. Raghunathrao began to enlist his own troops and wrote to Haidar Ali for support. Naro Appaji, the Maratha officer in charge of law and order in Pune, heightened the security around Raghunathrao by placing guards to watch all the exits of the palace and the city. Raghunathrao pitched his tents outside and declared that he was going on an expedition.

As soon as this news reached Narayanrao he returned to Pune and found Raghunathrao in his tents. He brought him back to the palace on 11 April 1773 and placed additional guards to prevent his escape. This further strained the relationship between Narayanrao and Raghunathrao. In July 1773, Raghunathrao become so exasperated with the restrictions imposed on him that he threatened to starve himself, his wife and his adopted son to death. Narayanrao failed to sooth things over by compromise. He had no advisors whom he could trust at this point.

=== Second attempt to escape ===
Two agents from Nagpur had been dispatched to Pune to request the Peshwa's confirmation for making Raghuji Bhonsle, the son of Mudhoji Bhonsle, the ruler of Nagpur in order to put the succession dispute between Mudhoji and his brother Sabaji to an end. But when the two agents arrived at Pune in the summer of 1773 and discovered the tensions between Narayanrao and Raghunathrao, they realised they had much to benefit from the chaos. At the same time Narayanrao continued supporting the claim of Sabaji and sent armed reinforcements under Khanderao Darekar to support him against his brother. This caught the ire of Mudhoji who vaguely told his agents to do whatever they deemed necessary for accomplishing their mission by supporting Raghunathrao's power.

But the agents needed to have a discussion with Raghunathrao before they could formulate a plan. Raghunathrao was in strict confinement at the time and so they approached Sakharam Hari Gupte, a strong partisan of Raghunathrao who had also been incensed by the Peshwa's decision to reduce the caste status of his community. They manage to obtain a secret meeting with Raghunathrao in which they hatch a plan which involved seizing Narayanrao and placing Raghunathrao on the throne. This would require Raghunathrao to be free and organise an armed force. In August 1773, during nighttime, Raghunathrao tried to escape using the help of Lakshman Kashi. But Raghunathrao was caught and taken into custody while Lakshman Kashi managed to escape and fled from Pune.

When news of Raghunathrao's attempted escape reached Narayanrao he made the terms of his uncle's confinement harsher. Raghunathrao was no longer allowed to leave his room, all his essentials were delivered to him and his lavish lifestyle was curtailed. As part of his prayer, Raghunathrao would stand in the open and gaze at the sun, but he was now barred from performing it which made him furious. Although the relationship between Madhavrao and Raghunathrao, the former carefully avoided exasperating his uncle beyond a certain limit and skillfully employed his uncle's partisans so as to prevent any action against him. But Narayanrao lacked his elder brother's foresight and so his dissidents were able to find a common goal in supporting his uncle.

=== Third attempt to escape ===
Raghunathrao was also able to find the sympathy of Appaji Ram, the ambassador of Haidar Ali at Pune, who managed to persuade his ruler to support Raghunathrao's cause. When Narayan found out about his uncle's plan to escape by enlisting the support Haidar Ali, he confined him in his palace and allowed neither his friends to visit him nor his servants to attend to him. His uncle, whether through exasperation or shrewdness, declared that he would starve himself to death so that his murder would be attributed to his nephew. For the next eighteen days, he consumed nothing except two ounces of deer milk each day. When he was finally exhausted due to pangs of hunger, his nephew somewhat relented by promising him a district and five castles and a jagir of Rs. 12 lakh per annum, provided some of the great chieftains would become surety for his future conduct.

== Preparations ==
The period between 16 and 30 August witnessed an unprecedented number of secret talks and concealed discussions taking place among the various partisans of Raghunathrao, but as this had been a regular occurrence at the palace, no responsible official paid any serious attention to them. Since Raghunathrao could not leave his confinement, the preparations for the plot were carried out by Tujali Pawar, an influential personal servant of Raghunathrao and his wife Anandibai. Tujali additionally felt he had been wronged by Narayanrao and possibly Madhavrao, and regardless of whether this supposed offense was real or not, it motivated him to play an integral part in the plot. While the previous plan involved simply capturing Narayanrao, the new plan involved his murder and was partly based on the assumption that Sakharam Bapu would remain neutral with regards to the plot.

The Ganapati festival was held for a period of ten days between 21 and 31 August. The festival was a holiday for the administration and all the officials and staff were occupied with various aspects of the festival such as the worship in the morning and evening, Vedic recitation, music, dance, durbars, feasts and processions. Tulaji met with the Gardi leaders during the Ganesh festival to inform them of the plot being hatched. Since he was an old servant he couldn't be abruptly dismissed even if suspected of a conspiracy and had ready access to his master and his wife in order to plan out various parts of the plot. Sumersinh was the Gardi officer who had been appointed by Narayanrao to be incharge of his uncle and hence had free access to him. He was won over by Tulaji, along with Muhammad Yusuf, Kharagsinh and Bahadur Khan, each of them had about a thousand soldiers working under them. They were promised to be given a cash reward of Rs. 3 lakh if they successfully executed the plot. A written order was produced by Raghunathrao for these four chiefs, ordering them to "seize" the Peshwa. The written order might have been altered before being delivered to the Gardi chiefs and the word "seize" might've been replaced with the word "slay" but the identity of the person who did this has remained a mystery. Meanwhile, the Gardis chiefs were aware that the Peshwa could be slain if he were to offer armed resistance. When they conveyed these thoughts to Raghunathrao, he absolved them of any responsibility for the possible murder.

== Assassination ==
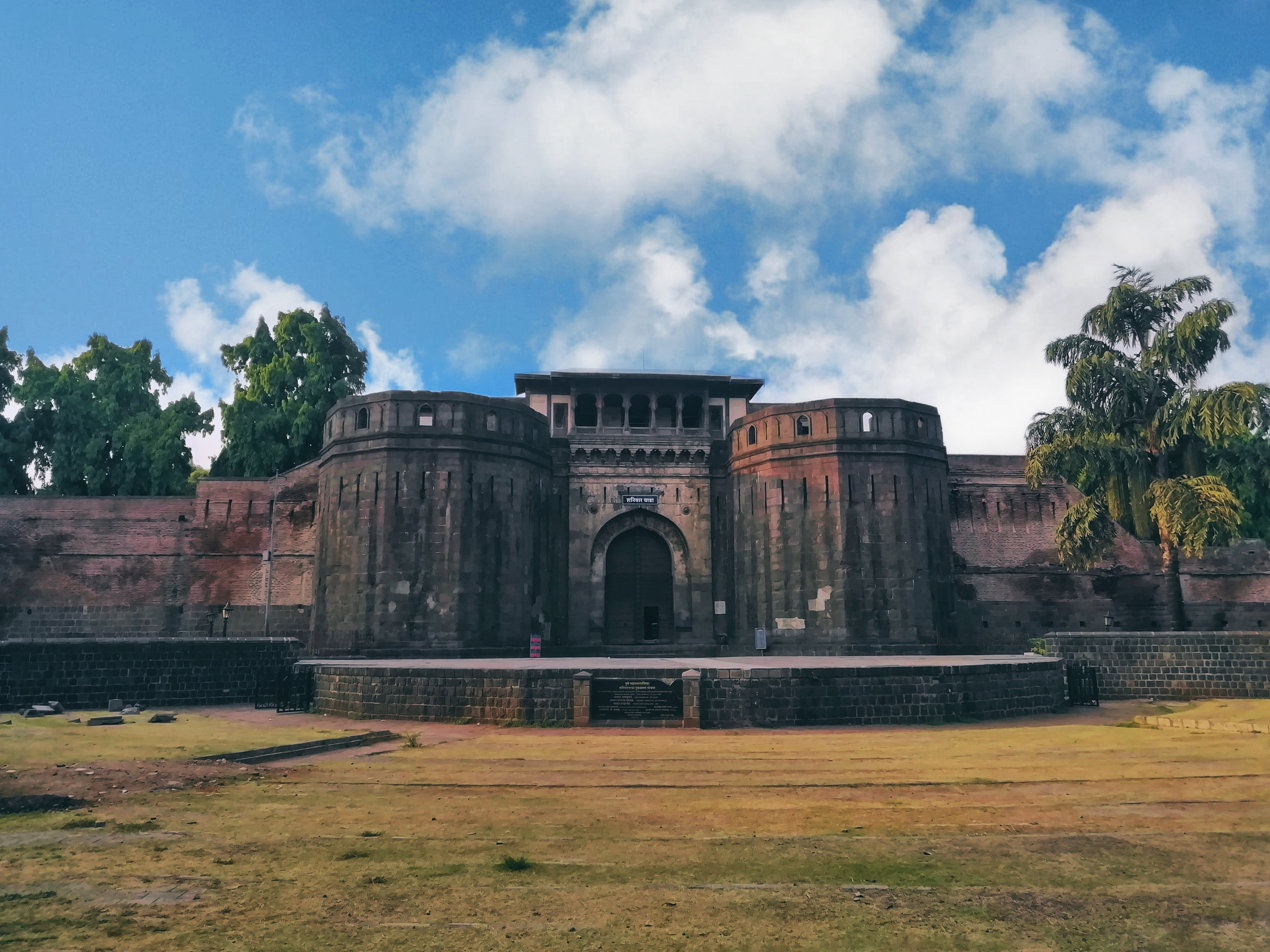
Shanivar Wada the place of assassination

Raghuji Angre of Kolaba had arrived in Pune to meet with the Peshwa and asked him to make a return visit on 30 August. And so Narayanrao along with Haripant Phadke went to Angre's residence at around ten in the morning. Raghuji told Narayanrao during their conversational about the troubling rumours he had heard and warned him to be on his guard against danger to his life. After the meeting with Raghuji, Narayanrao and Phadke went to the Parvati temple to have their breakfast along with some guests who had been invited there. After the meal, the Peshwa and Haripant went back to the palace. Narayanrao told Haripant what he had heard from Raghuji and asked him to take the necessary steps to prevent any mischief. Haripant assured him that he would take care of the matter but first he had to attend to a mid-day meal with a friend. The Peshwa retired to his room in the palace. Meanwhile, Tujali found out that the plot had been leaked and told the Gardi chiefs to immediately execute the plan or else everything could be ruined.

At around one o'clock in the afternoon, five hundred soldiers led by the Gardi chiefs cut down the men guarding the hind gate and immediately rushed into the palace. They demanded payment of their long delayed salaries. The clerks and servants admonished the soldiers for the commotion and told them that their grievances would be listened to in the office. The soldiers responded by attacking the clerks; when one of them took shelter behind a cow, that used to be on the premises at all times for fresh milk, the soldiers cut down the animal and the man hiding behind it. They closed the front gate and proceeded to the Peshwa's room upstairs with their swords drawn and deafening shouts. The palace was packed with cries of horror and grief by the inmates but there was nothing they could do to stop the attack.

Narayanrao was entirely unarmed at this time and in fear of his life he escaped through the back door to the apartment of his aunt Parvitabai, with whom he had a very close relationship as she had practically raised him since he was an infant. Parvatibai told him to go to his uncle as he could save his life. Narayanrao ran to his uncle who was performing his worship and held on to him, begging to be saved and even offering to make him Peshwa in exchange for being spared by the Gardi soldiers. Meanwhile, Tulaji and Sumersinh who had closely followed Narayanrao arrived there and pulled him away from his uncle. Tulaji violently seized Narayanrao and Sumersinh hacked him to pieces. Narayanrao's servant Chapaji Tilekar fell upon his master's body to save him with some maids and they were all cruelly cut down. A little later Naroba Naik, an old and trusted man on palace duty, came forth and berated Raghunathrao for allowing such deplorable actions and he too was slain by the Gardis. Within a period of half an hour, eleven people had been killed in the palace, seven of them were Brahmins, two Maratha servants, two maids. One cow was also killed. The recently launched book, Assassination of the Peshwa, covers this tragic incident in detail.

== Perpetrators ==
=== Raghunath Rao ===
Raghunathrao Bhat (a.k.a. Ragho Ballal or Ragho Bharari) (18 August 1734 – 11 December 1783) was the 11th Peshwa of the Maratha Empire for a brief period from 1773 to 1774. Raghunathrao Bhat, also known as "Raghoba", "Raghoba Dada" and "Ragho Bharari," was the younger brother of Nanasaheb Peshwa. His father was Peshwa Bajirao I & mother was Kashibai. Raghunathrao was born in Mahuli near Satara on 8 December 1734. Much of his childhood was spent in Satara. A small time after his birth, his step-mother, Mastani gave birth to his brother, Krishna Rao, also named Shamsher Bahadur I.

After Maratha defeat at Third Battle of Panipat, his brother Nanasaheb Peshwa's death and his half brother's (Shamsher Bahadur) death in 1761, the Peshwa title was passed on to Madhavrao I, second son of Nanasaheb. Madhavrao was a minor when appointed Peshwa. Therefore, Raghunathrao was appointed as the regent to the young Peshwa. He soon fell out of favor with Madhavrao and even tried to conspire against him by joining the Nizam of Hyderabad against the Peshwa. The alliance was defeated at Ghodegaon, and Raghunathrao was placed under house arrest. After Madhavrao I's death in 1772, Raghunathrao was released from house arrest. He then became the regent of Madhavrao's younger brother Narayanrao. Together with his wife Anandibai, he had his nephew Narayanrao murdered.

Legend has it that the original command was "Hyala Dharaava" (Have him seized) written on a parchment of paper, and while the message was handed over to Anandibai to pass it on to the minions, she changed the letters to mean "Hyala Maraava" (Have him killed). And therefore when the assassins attacked the young Peshwa, he ran over outside of the house of Raghoba crying "Kaakaa malaa waachwaa" (Uncle, save me). His cry fell on deaf ears as Raghoba stood by imagining Narayanrao to be overacting while his nephew was eventually killed. After Narayanrao's murder, Raghoba became Peshwa, but he was shortly overthrown by Nana Phadnavis and 11 other administrators in what is called "The Baarbhaai Conspiracy" (Conspiracy by the Twelve). Raghunathrao was tried, convicted, and sentenced to death by the justice Ram Shastri Prabhune but the sentence was never carried out.

=== Anandibai ===
Anandibai was a Peshwa Queen and the wife of Raghunathrao, the 11th Peshwa of the Maratha Empire. Anandibai was born into a Chitpavan Brahmin family belonging to Guhagar village in the Konkan region of what is now Maharashtra state. She was the daughter of Raghu Mahadev Oak. Her cousin Gopikabai (of the Raste family), was the wife of Peshwa Balaji Bajirao. In December 1756, when Anandibai was yet a child, she was married to Raghunath Rao, younger brother of Balaji Baji Rao. She was his second wife. Raghunathrao's first wife (Janaki Bai of the Barwe family) had died in August 1755.

After the death of Madhavrao I in 1772, his brother Narayanrao was to take the throne but he was still a minor. There was debate among the Peshwas about who should become the next regent. Finally it was decided that Narayanrao would be the peshwa with his uncle Raghunathrao acting as regent. Initially this arrangement worked but soon Narayanrao imprisoned his uncle on charges of plotting to overthrow him.

On 30 August 1773 in Shaniwar Wada, in an effort to free himself, Raghunathrao hired Gardis as mercenaries. These men scaled and captured Shaniwar Wada. They quickly reached Narayanrao's chambers and held him captive. Narayanrao tried to appeal to his uncle but Anandibai intervened and did not allow his requests to reach Raghunathrao.

According to popular legend, Raghunathrao had sent a message to Sumer Singh Gardi to fetch Narayanrao using the Marathi word dharaa (धरा) or 'hold' (actual phrase in Marathi - " नारायणरावांना धरा"/"Narayanrao-ana dhara"). This message was intercepted by his wife Anandibai who changed a single letter to make it read as maaraa (मारा) or 'kill' . The miscommunication led the Gardis to chase Narayanrao, who, upon hearing them coming, started running towards his uncles' residence screaming, "Kaka! Mala Vachva!!" ("Uncle! Save me!"). But nobody came to help him and he was killed in the presence of his uncle

== Aftermath ==
=== Reaction ===
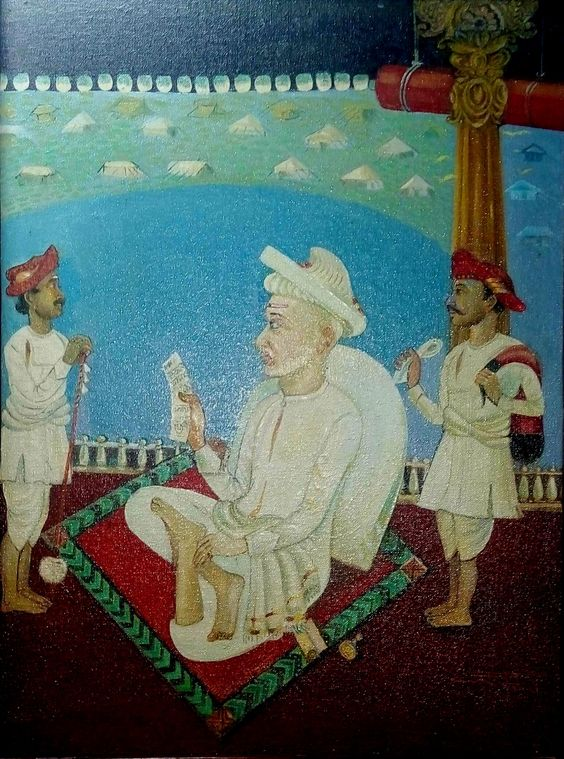
Ramshastri Prabhune the chief Justice of this case.

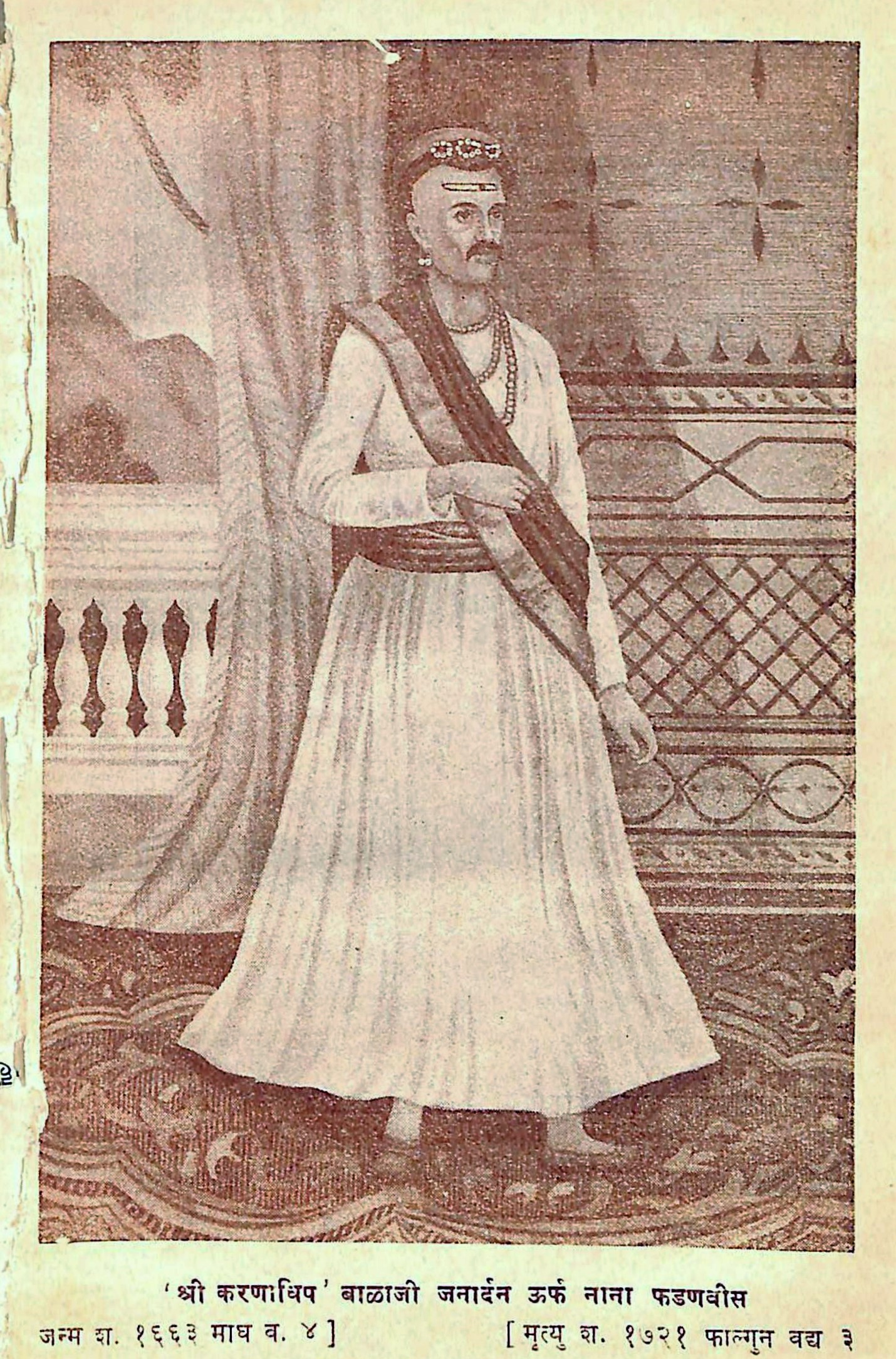
Nana Phadnavis was one of the prominent leaders of the Barbhais Council.

Upon hearing the news, Haripant Phadke hurriedly went to the palace with his troops and artillery but since he did not know what was happening inside he could not open fire on the structure. Many Maratha officials including Nana Phadnavis met at the Budhwar Police Station while others such as Bhavanrao Pratinidhi, Maloji Ghorpade and others went to the palace to obtain correct information of what had happened. The Gardis were guarding the premises of the palace and only allowed the Maratha officials to enter after laying down their arms. When they were permitted to meet Raghunathrao they found him lying on the courtyard of the groundfloor and by Gardi soldiers with their swords drawn out. In the meanwhile some of the other Gardis began hastily plundering the palace and were only pacified due to the help of some city bankers.

It nearly midnight when Raghunathrao had been proclaimed as the ruler of the state by the Gardis and allowed to pick his officials that the Gardis allowed the dead bodies to be taken out and funeral rites to be performed. The mangled pieces of Narayanrao were collected in a bundle for cremation. Sakharam Bapu was overcome by grief since he couldn't fulfil the promise he had made to Madhavrao and his wife Ramabai to protect Narayanrao. He refused to take any part in the new administration and left the city. Nana Phadnavis also refused to join Raghunathrao's government and the latter had no liking for him. The horrifying and chaotic events at Pune presented the enemies of the Marathas with the moment they had been looking for all along. A wave of attacks had occurred throughout the country although no one took up arms against the capital of Pune itself. It was only during the time of the Dashera festival on 25 September that Raghunathrao began to address that threats that were posed by Nizam Ali and Haidar Ali.

Most people reluctantly accepted Raghunathrao's rule because there was no other male member of the Peshwa's family to take the reins of power, but they were apprehensive at heart to submit to the rule of a person who killed his own nephew who was unarmed and who belonged to the same Brahmin caste. The mother of Narayanrao at Nashik was consumed with grief and sorrow when she learned about her son's death. Her eldest son and heir to the empire Vishwasrao had died at the Battle of Panipat in 1761, her second eldest son Madhavrao succumbed to disease and her youngest had been brutally murdered. She felt so overcome with grief that she gave up her comfortable life and went around begging for alms with a half coconut shell from door to door. She regained her peace of mind when the ministers overthrew the murderer of her son and Narayanrao's wife, her daughter-in-law Gangabai, gave birth to a posthumous son.

=== Raghunathrao's short lived government ===
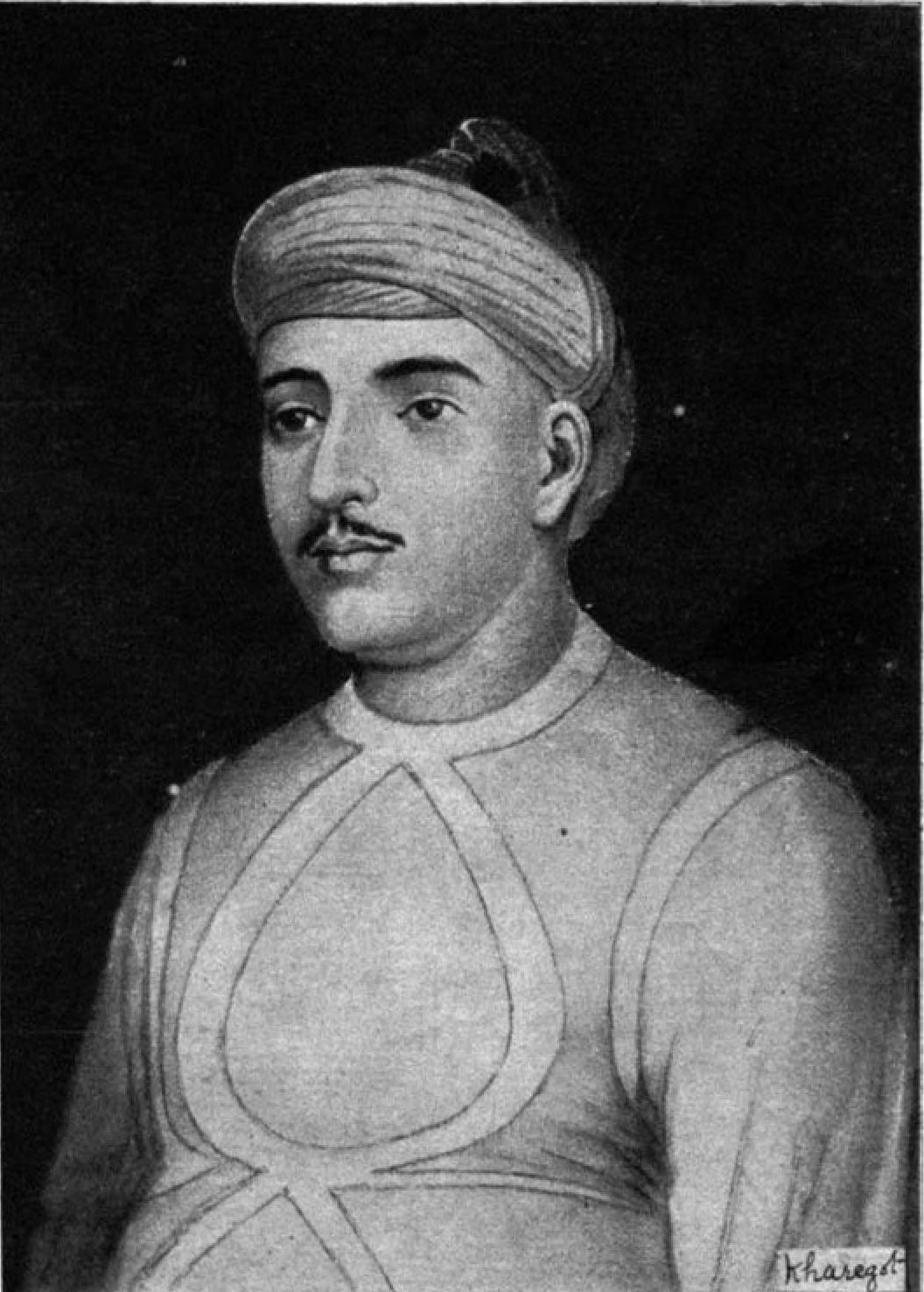
Ali Bahadur I, Nawab of Banda was berfly made Peshwa after Raghunathrao's conviction.

Having failed to convince the senior and most highly competent ministers such as Sakharam Bapu and Nana Phadnavis to join his new administration, Raghunathrao had to begin his rule with the help of ministers Chinto Vithal and Moroba Phadnavis. The two Nagpur agents also continued supporting him. Raghunathrao sent one of them, Laksham Kashi with a letter of friendly terms to Mudhoji Bhonsle inviting him to Pune with all his forces. The other Nagpur agent Vyankatrao remained in Pune to help the new Peshwa manage the new administration. He sent Amritrao to Satara to procure the robes from Chhatrapati Rajaram II but there was a delay and the robes were finally obtained on 10 October 1773. He did not ceremoniously accept them in a durbar at Pune but rather at Alegaon near the river Bhima on the last day of October. He prepared his own seal and purposefully omitted Rajaram's name as being inauspicious.

During the Dashera festival occurring on 25 September 1773, apart from having to discuss the threats posed by Haidar Ali and Nizam Ali, Raghunathrao also had to deal with the Gardi chiefs who virtually held all the power and whose only goal was to get as much money from him as possible. He appointed Bhavanrao Pratinidhi as his agent for settling the matter with the Gardi chiefs. Bhavanrao Pratinidhi got rid of the Gardi chiefs from the palace by paying them the stipulated five lakh rupees and an additional amount of three lakh rupees in lieu of the three forts they wanted as their safe resort. During the negotiations, the Gardis had threatened to depose Raghunathrao and install Ali Bahadur (grandson of Peshwa Baji Rao) as the peshwa if their payments were made. They also demanded and were given a written order that Raghunathrao would protect them under all circumstances.

Hence Raghunathrao now had no strong supporters except second rate men such as the Gardi chiefs, and Sakharam Hari, Sadashiv Ramchandra, Vyankatrao Kashi, Abaji Mahadev, Tulaji Pawar, Moroba Phadnavis, Maloji Ghorpade, Govindrao Gaikwad, Manaji Phadke and Mudhoji Bhonsle. Gangadhar Yeshwant, an important partisan of Raghunathrao, died on 20 February 1774 and this considerably weakened his party. But at least his monetary troubles were relieved after Visaji Krishna arrived in Pune and brought with him, under orders from the previous Peshwa, a treasure of 22 lakh rupees and which Raghunathrao greedily sized.

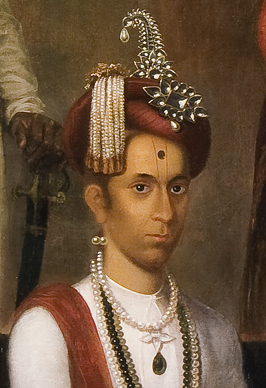
Ather the accusation of Raghunath Rao and Anandibai, 40 days old infant Madhavrao II became Peshwa.

=== Legal consequences ===
Ram Shastri, the Nyayadhish ("Chief Justice") of the Maratha empire, likely began looking into the killing of Narayanrao immediately after the incident despite Raghunathrao's opposition. The investigation lasted for around six weeks and decisions were made in accordance with established judicial practices. Shastri found Raghunathrao as the main culprit and in addition about fifty persons more or less responsible for the murder (forty nine males and one female servant). Of these forty nine men, thirteen were Gardis (eight Hindus and five Muslims), twenty six were Brahmin, three were Prabhu and seven were Marathas. The twenty six Brahmins were essentially clerks who acted as agents in planning and executing the details of the plan. Vyankatrao Kashi, his brother Laxman and Sakharam Hari Gupte were the three Prabhus who were declared to have played a prominent role in the plot. When Shastri approached Raghunathrao, the latter downplayed the murder as a private, personal affair and asked the former to not concern himself with it. Shastri on his part, without an ounce of fear, told Raghunathrao that he was the main culprit for the murder of his nephew. Hence Raghunathrao and the general public understood the degree of power that lay with the judiciary in a well-governmed state. But Shastri was dismissed from his office by Raghunathrao and went back to his native village.

==== Barbhais Council ====
While Shastri was conducting his investigation, Sakharam Bapu ensured that pregnant Gangabai, the widow of Narayanrao, was secure and safe from harm's way. If Gangabai were to give birth to a male child, he would become the heir to the kingdom. But if she were to give birth to a female child, Sakharam Bapu contemplated the idea of making Ali Bahadur, the grandson of Baji Rao, the Peshwa of the Maratha empire. He convinced most of the Maratha chiefs from Raghunathrao's camp to switch sides without rousing his suspicion. He laid the foundations of a group of twelve Maratha officials and chiefs who were collectively known as the Barbhais Council ("Twelve Comrades"). These included Nana Phadnavis, Haripant Phadnavis, Babuji Naik, Maloji Ghorpade, Bhavanrao Pratinidhi, Raste, Patwardhans with the addition of Mahadji Shinde and Tukoji Holkar.

The Barbhais Council proceeded to go to war with Raghunathrao in order to bring him to justice and to prevent the state from falling under British domination. As it became apparent that Raghunathrao was losing the war, he shielded his allies from possible harm for the services they had rendered onto him. He sent Muhammad Yusuf to Mudhoji Bhonsle in Nagpur, Tulaji Pawar and Kharagsinh to Haidar Ali, and finally Sumersinh to Indore. On 18 April 1774, Gangabai gave birth to a son who was soon invested with the robes of the Peshwa. Raghunathrao essentially gave up his position as Peshwa and fled towards Surat. At the same time, the Barbhais Council re-established their power at Pune and requested Shastri to come back and assume his position as the Nyayadhish of the Maratha Empire. Shastri obliged but only after the Council agreed to never interfere with his duties and to faithfully execute the degrees he passed. The Council compelled Mudhoji and Haidra Ali to hand over the offenders they had been shielding and caught the ones who tried to escape. The most serious offenders such as Kharagsinh, Tujali Pawar and Muhammad Yusuf were sentenced to death, slightly less serious ones such as Vyankatrao Kashi and Sakharam Hari were sentenced to life imprisonment and the rest were discharged after having served their prison sentence.

There is a belief in Pune that Narayanrao's ghost roams the ruins of Shaniwar Wada at every full moon night and calls out for help just like the way he did on the fateful day of his assassination. Bajirao II believed in the ghost superstition too and planted thousands of mango trees around Pune city and gave donations to Brahmins and religious institutions in the hope that this would propitiate the ghost.

Preceded by Madhavrao I	Peshwa of the Maratha Confederacy; 1772–1773	Succeeded by Raghunathrao
