= Ramshastri (film) =

- Theatrical release poster
- Directed by: Gajanan Jagirdar
- Written by: V. S. Sukhtankar
- Screenplay by: Shivram Vashikar
- Produced by: Vishnupant Govind Damle; S. Fatelal
- Production company: Prabhat Film Company
- Distributed by: Prabhat Film Company
- Release date: 30 June 1944
- Country: India
- Language: Marathi

Ramshastri is a 1944 Indian Marathi-language biographical film directed by Gajanan Jagirdar and produced under the banner of Prabhat Film Company. Based on the life of the 18th-century jurist Ramshastri Prabhune, the film stars Gajanan Jagirdar, Meenakshi Shirodkar, Hansa Wadkar and Lalita Pawar in the lead roles. It was released on 30 June 1944. The film depicts Ramshastri's rise as a scholar and his tenure as chief justice in the court of the Peshwas.

== Plot ==
Ram, a young boy from a poor family, is determined to pursue education despite several obstacles. After being refused admission by a teacher in Benares, he secretly learns by listening to the teacher's lessons and eventually earns his place as a student. After twelve years of study, he returns as the scholar Ramshastri.

In Pune, Ramshastri becomes known for his knowledge and integrity. When Ranoji, a court poet, marries Shyama, a slave girl, their marriage is challenged in the Peshwa's court. Ramshastri argues that slavery has no legal or religious sanction and that Shyama's status cannot invalidate the marriage. Impressed by his reasoning, Peshwa Madhavrao appoints him chief justice. Ramshastri gains a reputation for impartial judgments, including cases involving powerful officials. Meanwhile, Anandibai, the wife of Raghunathrao, conspires with General Sumer Singh against the young Peshwa Narayanrao. After Madhavrao's death, Narayanrao succeeds him, with Raghunathrao serving as his guardian.

Anandibai secretly alters an order to have Narayanrao killed. After the murder, Raghunathrao becomes Peshwa. Ranoji obtains the original order, while Shyama provides further evidence of Anandibai's involvement. Ramshastri confronts Raghunathrao and declares that Narayanrao's murder can be atoned for only through death. Having upheld justice despite political pressure, Ramshastri leaves the Peshwa court with his family.

== Cast ==
- Gajanan Jagirdar as Ramshastri Prabhune
  - Anant Marathe as Young Ramshastri
- Meenakshi Shirodkar as Janaki Prabhune
  - Baby Shakuntala as Young Janaki
- Hansa Wadkar as Shyama
- Lalita Pawar as Anandibai
- Shakuntala Paranjpye as Ramshastri's mother

== Reception ==
It was a major commercial success. The film ran for 30 weeks in Pune and 28 weeks in Mumbai, attaining silver jubilee status. It was also critically acclaimed and became one of the most successful films produced by Prabhat Film Company. Contemporary and later accounts describe the film as a major commercial and critical success. It received several honours at the Bengal Film Journalists' Association Awards. It won six major awards, including Best Film, Best Screenplay, Best Direction, Best Actor, Best Supporting Actor and Best Dialogue.
