= Ramshastri =

Ramshastri may refer to:

- Ramshastri Prabhune, Chief Justice (Mukhya Nyayadhish or "Pantnyayadhish") in the apex court of the Maratha Empire
- Ramshastri (film), a 1944 Indian film about Ramshastri Prabhune
