= List of Chitpavan Brahmins =

Notable members of the Chitpavan Brahmin community

This is a list of notable members of the Chitpavan Brahmin community.

- Balaji Vishwanath and his descendants, Bajirao I, Chimaji Appa, Balaji Bajirao, Raghunathrao, Sadashivrao Bhau, Madhavrao I, Narayanrao, Madhavrao II, and Bajirao II
- Nana Fadnavis (1742–1800), regent to Madhavrao II
- The Patwardhans, military leaders under the Peshwa and later rulers of various princely states
- Balaji Pant Natu, spied for the British against the Peshwa era Maratha Empire and raised the Union Jack over Shaniwar Wada.
- Lokhitwadi (Gopal Hari Deshmukh) (1823–1892), social reformer
- Vishnubawa Brahmachari (1825–1871), 19th-century Marathi Hindu revivalist
- Mahadev Govind Ranade (1842–1901), judge and social reformer
- Vishnushastri Krushnashastri Chiplunkar (1850–1882), Marathi writer
- Vasudev Balwant Phadke (1845–1883), Indian independence activist
- Bal Gangadhar Tilak (1856–1920), Indian self-rule activist
- Gopal Ganesh Agarkar (1856 – June 1895), journalist, educator and social reformer
- Keshavsut (Krishnaji Keshav Damle) (15 March 1866 – 7 November 1905), Marathi-language poet
- Vaman Shivram Apte (1858–1892), Indian lexicographer
- Dhondo Keshav Karve (1858–1962), social reformer and advocate of women's education
- Anandibai Joshi (1865–1887), first Indian woman to get a medical degree
- Gopal Krishna Gokhale (1866–1915), Indian political leader and social reformer
- Ramabai Mahadev Ranade (1862–1925), Indian social worker and women's rights activist
- Chapekar brothers (1873–1899), (1879–1899), brothers who assassinated British plague commissioner W. C. Rand
- Gangadhar Nilkanth Sahasrabuddhe, Indian social reformer
- Narasimha Chintaman Kelkar (1872–1947), writer, journalist, and nationalist leader
- Vinayak Damodar Savarkar (28 May 1883 – 26 February 1966), Indian politician and ideologue
- Senapati Bapat (12 November 1880 – 28 November 1967), Indian independence activist
- Dadasaheb Phalke (30 April 1870 – 16 February 1944), Indian producer, directorm and screenwriter
- Krushnaji Prabhakar Khadilkar (25 November 1872 – 26 August 1948), editor of Kesari and Navakal
- Vishnu Narayan Bhatkhande (1860–1936), Indian musical theorist
- Vishwanath Kashinath Rajwade (1863–1926), Indian historian
- Pandurang Vaman Kane (1880–1972), Indologist
- Anant Laxman Kanhere (1891–1910), Indian nationalist and revolutionary
- Vinoba Bhave (1895–1982), Gandhian leader and freedom fighter
- D. R. Bendre (1896–1981), poet and writer in the Kannada language
- Narhar Vishnu Gadgil (10 January 1896 – 12 January 1966), Congress leader and Member of Nehru's cabinet
- Babasaheb Apte (1903–1971), an early leader in the Rashtriya Swayamsevak Sangh (RSS), a Hindutva paramilitary organisation
- Irawati Karve (1905–1970), Indian sociologist and anthropologist
- Nathuram Godse (19 May 1910 – 15 November 1949), Mahatma Gandhi's assassin
- Narayan Apte (1911–1949) – co-conspirator in the assassination of Gandhi
- Gopal Godse (1919–2005) – co-conspirator in the assassination of Gandhi and Nathuram Godse's younger brother
- Ramchandra Dattatreya Ranade (1886–1956), Indian scholar and philosopher
- Pandurang Shastri Athavale (1920–2003), Indian philosopher, spiritual leader, and religious reformer
- Dr Dhananjay Gadgil, a pioneer of Indian economic planning
- Sumitra Mahajan (Sathe), former Lok Sabha speaker
- Digambar Dandekar, co founder of Camlin
- Raghunath Chitale, Chitale Bandhu Mithaiwale
- Ganesh Gadgil, founder of Purushottam Narayan Gadgil (PNG) jewellers
- D.B Deodhar, known as the Grand Old Man of Indian Cricket
- Dr Shreeram Lagoo, iconic Marathi actor
- Sudhir Phadke, prominent Marathi music composer
- Dr Madhav Gadgil, highly respectable ecologist
- Madhuri Dixit (born 1967), a Bollywood actress
- Milind Soman (04 November 1969), a Bollywood actor
- Vidyadhar Gokhale, Indian Politician and Writer
- Ramkrishna Buva Vaze, classical vocal musician
- Manoj Naravane, 28th Chief of Army Staff
- Sai Paranajpye, Acclaimed movie director and screenwriter
- Vikram Gokhale, Veteran film, television, and stage actor
- Vinda Karandikar, Jnanpeeth awardee
- Chintamanrao Appasaheb Patwardhan, ruler of Sangli and Padmabhushan
- Dr Narendra Karmarkar, Renowned mathematician and theoretical computer scientist best known for discovering Karmarkar’s algorithm
- Dr Suhas Patankar, a pioneer in computational fluid dynamics
- Dr Vishnu Bhide, a highly distinguished physicist
