= Anant Marathe =

Indian actor

Anant Purushottam Marathe
- Born: 1929
- Died: 2003 (aged 73–74)
- Other names: Anant Marathe, Anant Kumar
- Known for: Marathi and Hindi cinema
- Relatives: Ramchandra Purushottam Marathe (brother)

Anant Purushottam Marathe (Marathi: अनंत पुरुषोत्तम मराठे; 1929–2003) was an Indian actor, famous for playing supporting role in 1944 Marathi movie Ramshastri, on the life of Ram Shastri and the role of Shivaram Rajguru in Hindi movie Shaheed.
