= Sumer Singh Gardi =

18th-century Maratha guard

Sumer Singh Gardi was a Gardi guard of the Peshwas. He is mainly known for his involvement in the assassination of Peshwa Narayanrao in 1773, where he led several Gardis and brutally killed Narayanrao. The assassination was performed on the orders of Raghunathrao, whose message was intercepted by his wife Anandibai.

== Assassination of Narayanrao ==
According to popular legend, Raghunathrao had sent a message to Sumer Singh Gardi to fetch Narayanrao using the Marathi word dharaa (धरा) or 'hold' (actual phrase in Marathi - " नारायणरावांना धरा"/"Narayanrao-ana dhara"). This message was intercepted by his wife Anandibai who changed a single letter to make it read as maaraa (मारा) or 'kill' . The miscommunication led the Gardis to chase Narayanrao, who, upon hearing them coming, started running towards his uncles' residence screaming, "Kaka! Mala Vachva!!" ("Uncle! Save me!"). But nobody came to help him and he was killed in the presence of his uncle.

== Death ==
Sumer Singh Gardi died mysteriously at Patna in 1775.
