= Khanjari =

Khanjari خنجري
- Village
- Location within Iran
- Coordinates: 35°25′18″N 57°45′41″E
- Country: Iran
- Province: Razavi Khorasan
- County: Bardaskan
- Bakhsh: Anabad
- Rural District: Sahra

Population (2006)
  - Total: 104
- Time zone: UTC+3:30 (IRST)
  - Summer (DST): UTC+4:30 (IRDT)

Khanjari (Persian: خنجري, also Romanized as Khanjarī; also known as Ḩanjarī-ye Pā’īn, Khanjarī Soflá, and Khanjarī-ye Pā’īn) is a village in Sahra Rural District, Anabad District, Bardaskan County, Razavi Khorasan Province, Iran. At the 2006 census, its population was 104, in 29 families.
