= Ramshastri Prabhune =

Ramshastri Prabhune Pant Nyayadish
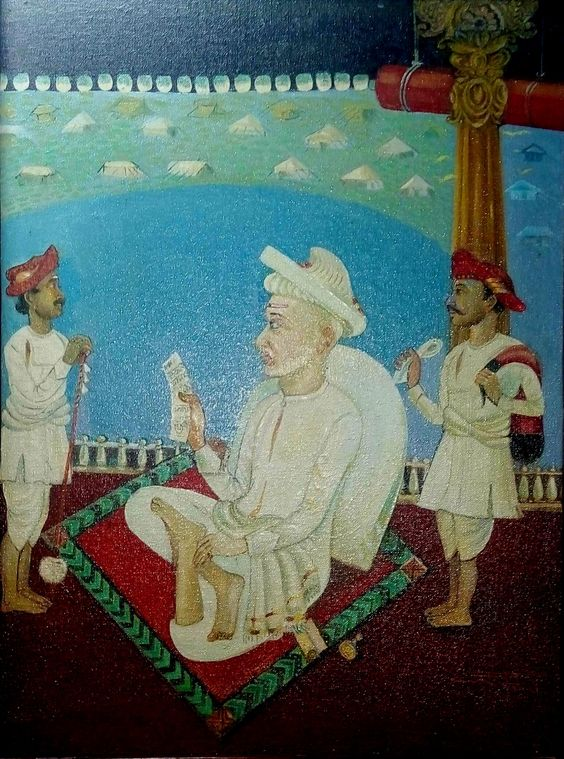
- Painting of Ramshastri prabhune in 1789

Chief Justice of Maratha Empire
- In office 1759 – October 1789
- Monarch: Rajaram II; Shahu II
- Succeeded by: Ayya Shastri

Personal details
- Born: 1720 Mahuli
- Died: October 1789
- Known for: conviction of Raghunathrao and Anandibai for the Assassination of Narayan Rao

Ram Shastri Prabhune was the Chief Justice (Mukhya Nyayadhish or "Pantnyayadhish" ) in the apex court of the Maratha Empire in the latter half of the 18th century, during the heyday of that empire. He is best remembered for having passed strictures against the sitting Peshwa of the time for instigating murder. Ram Shastri's integrity in public affairs is regarded as a model for all times.

== Biography ==
Ramshastri Prabhune was born in Deshastha Rigvedi Brahmin family in the small town of Kshetra Mahuli also called Sangam Mahuli, near Satara, not be confused with Mahuli. Little is known of his early life, with references to him being available only after he entered the service of the Peshwas.

Ram Shastri held office under the Peshwas during the latter part of the 18th century. Known for his honesty and integrity, he even declined a royal gift made to his wife. He turned down the offer of an official mansion and continued to live in his humble ancestral home in the Brahmin quarter of Poona city on his modest income. It is said that his wife sold milk from their two cows and a buffalo in order to supplement his monthly income. This Brahminical frugality complemented his wide and eclectic scholarship: he was renowned for his knowledge of law (including British law), philosophy, and the theories of statecraft and political science. He was proficient in the Sanskrit, Marathi, Hindi, Urdu and English languages. As a young Brahmin student of Advaita vedanta, he had studied the Vedas, Upanishads and Puranas and was so well-versed in the Hindu scriptures, that he was considered as an authority in Pune in those times. He once debated for five days with Shri Varadendra Teertha, pontiff of the Madhva sect. After the debate, as a mark of respect and tribute to the scholarship of the pontiff he gave up his house and the structure is surviving to this day as the Shri Varadendra Swamy Mutt on Laxmi Road in Pune.

== Strictures against the Peshwa ==
Ram Shastri's most famous act was passing the death sentence on the ruling Peshwa of the time, Raghunath Rao, for the murder of his own nephew, Peshwa Narayan Rao. In 1772, Peshwa Madhavrao I died, leaving his brother Narayan Rao, a minor, as heir. Madhavrao's paternal uncle, Peshwa Raghunath Rao, was appointed regent in the minority of his nephew. The following year, an act infamous in the history of the Maratha Empire was perpetrated when the young boy was murdered, at the behest either of the Regent or of his wife Anandibai, by Raghunath Rao's guardsmen. On the quiet winter night of 17 December 1772, the assassins entered his private quarters at Shaniwarwada in Pune; the boy-Peshwa ran for safety to the apartments of his uncle and aunt, knowing little about the true origin of the plot. These guardsmen then committed the murder in the very presence of Raghunath Rao and Anandibai. While passing the statement, Ram Shashtri said that for this heinous act there is no other punishment than a death sentence.

Narayan Rao's wife delivered a son shortly after the death of her husband.

== In popular culture ==
In 1944, the movie Ramshastri, with screenplay by K.B. Dhawle, was produced by Prabhat Film Company.

== Bibliography ==
- Bhatia, Harbans Singh (2001). Mahrattas, Sikhs and Southern Sultans of India: Their Fight Against Foreign Power. Deep and Deep Publications. ISBN 9788171003693.
- Jasraj, Madhura Pandit (2015). V. Shantaram: The Man Who Changed Indian Cinema. Hay House, Inc. ISBN 9789384544416.
- Sharma, B. N. Krishnamurti (2000). A History of the Dvaita School of Vedānta and Its Literature, 3rd Edition. Motilal Banarsidass (2008 Reprint). ISBN 978-8120815759.
