= Kalbelia =

Tribe from Rajasthan, India

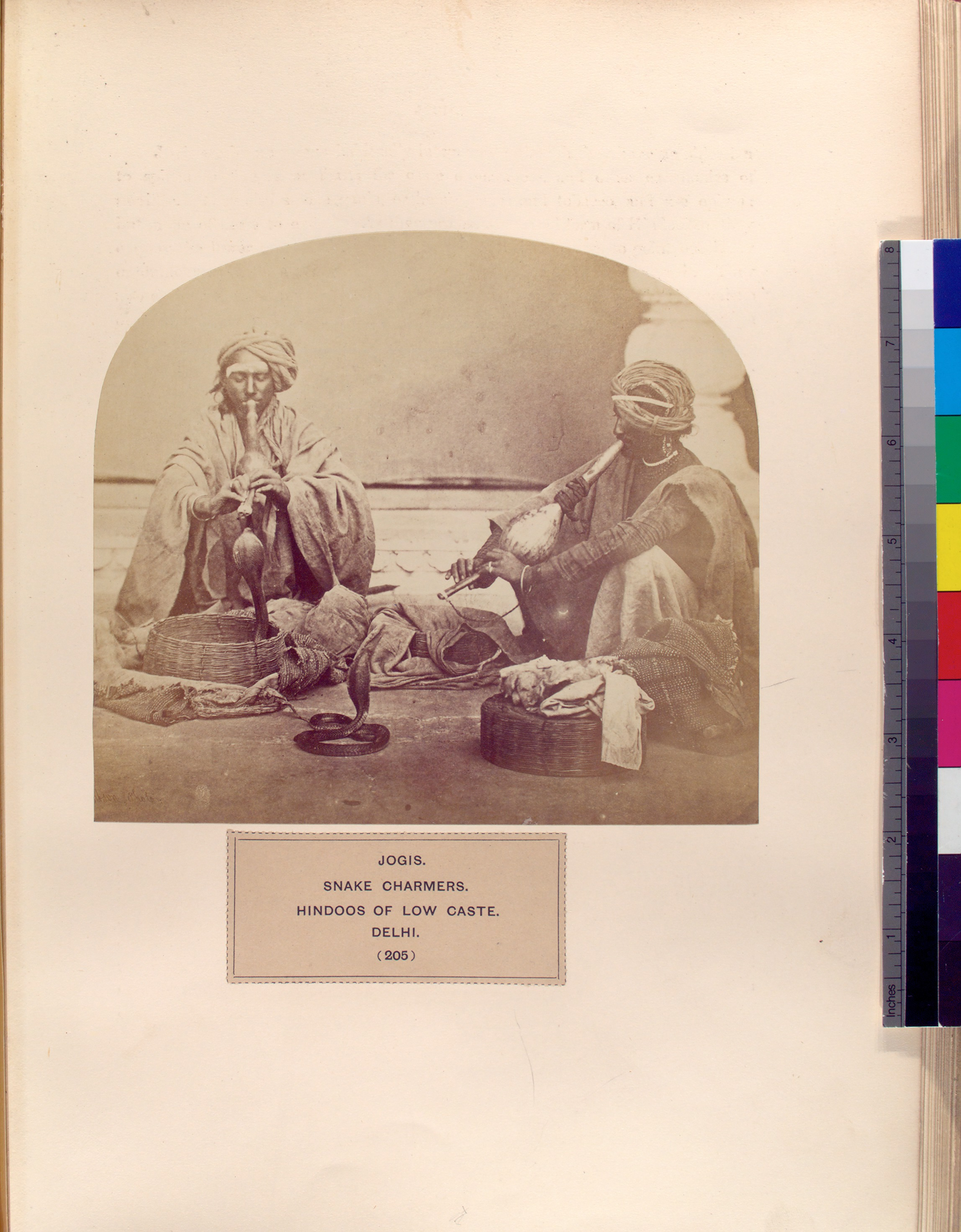
Snake Charmers 1868.

The Kalbelia are a snake charming tribe from the Thar Desert in Rajasthan, India. Dance is an integral part of their culture and performed by men and women.

Kalbelias belong to the Nath Shaiva sect and are followers of Sage Kanifnath, who according to a legend, drank a bowl of poison and was blessed with control over venomous snakes and animals.

== Etymology ==
One translation of the name "Kalbelia" is a combination of the words "Kal" meaning snake, and "Beliya", meaning friend.

Another translates the name as "bowl of death", with kaal meaning death and belia meaning bowl. This latter meaning refers to a foundational myth involving the sage Kanifnath, a prominent figure in their belief system, who is said to have consumed a bowl of poison. Consequently, his followers adopted the name Kalbelia to signify their devotion to the sage who mastered death.

== History ==
The Kalbelia call the 12th and 13th centuries as their golden age. But after the defeat of the Rajput king Prithviraj Chauhan to Muhammad Ghori, their fortunes declined. In the 14th century, they migrated out of present day Rajasthan to areas in Gujarat, Madhya Pradesh and Maharashtra due to persecution and forced conversions by Islamic rulers. They were later invited to the Mughal courts to entertain with snake tricks and their traditional Kalbeliya dance.

During the British rule, they participated in the freedom movement by transferring secret messages and providing safe passage and guides for revolutionaries who needed to cross the harsh desert to reach different states or the border, away from British-monitored roads. Due to this and that they are nomads and therefore did not fall under any administrative framework, the British included the Kalbelia under the Criminal Tribes Act, designating them ‘habitual criminals’, resulting in social stigmatisation. After Indian independence, the Criminal Tribes Act was repealed in 1952 and the tribe was "denotified". However, the social and economic marginalisation by other communities continues even today due to the stigma of the past.

== Cultural practices ==
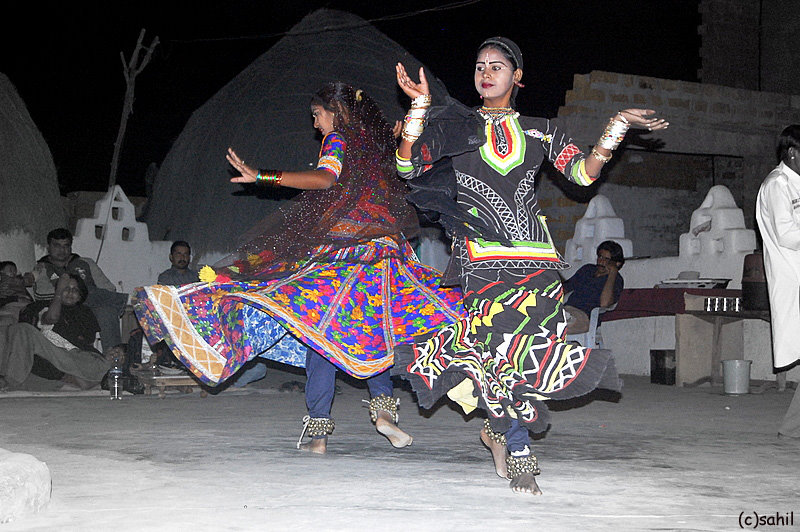
A Rajasthani folk dance, Kalbelia

Kalbelias are divided into two main groups, the Daliwal and Mewara. The Kalbelias moved frequently from one place to another in ancient times. Their traditional occupation is catching snakes and trading snake venom. They rear snakes, dogs, hens, horses, donkeys, pigs and goats. Hence, the dance movements and the costumes of their community bear a resemblance to those of the serpents. They are also called Sapera and Jogira, Gattiwala and Poogiwara. The largest cluster of the Kalbelias is in Pali district, followed by significant other groups in Ajmer, Chittorgarh and Udaipur district. They live a nomadic life and belong to the scheduled tribes.

Traditionally, Kalbelia men carried cobras in cane baskets from door to door in villages while their women sang, danced and begged for alms. They revere the cobra and advocate the non-killing of such reptiles. In the villages, if a snake inadvertently happened to enter a home, a Kalbelia would be summoned to catch the serpent and to take it away without killing it. Kalbelias have traditionally been a fringe group in the society, living in spaces outside the village where they reside. They live in makeshift camps called deras. The Kalbelias move their deras from one place to another in a circuitous route repeated over time. Over the generations, the Kalbelias acquired a unique understanding of the local flora and fauna, and are aware of herbal remedies for various diseases which, in turn, is an alternative source of income for them.

Since the enactment of the Wildlife Act of 1972, the Kalbelias have been pushed out of their traditional profession of snake handling. Now performing arts are a major source of income for them and these have received widespread recognition within and outside India. Opportunities for performance are sporadic, and also depend on tourism, which is season specific, so members of the community work in the fields, or graze cattle to sustain themselves.

=== Religion ===
The Kalbelias are Hindus and dedicated followers of the Nath (a Shaiva sub-tradition) tradition, and the Kalbelias center their spiritual life around Lord Shiva and the sacred Nāgas. This deep-rooted connection to serpents is expressed through the worship of deities like Manasa and the observance of Naga Panchami, a day dedicated to honoring the cobra as a divine entity.

Similar to another Shaivist tradition the Lingayats, the Kalbelias also bury their dead, instead of cremating them (as is common with most Hindus), and place an idol of Lord Shiva's Nandi Bull over the graves.

=== Kalbelia dance ===
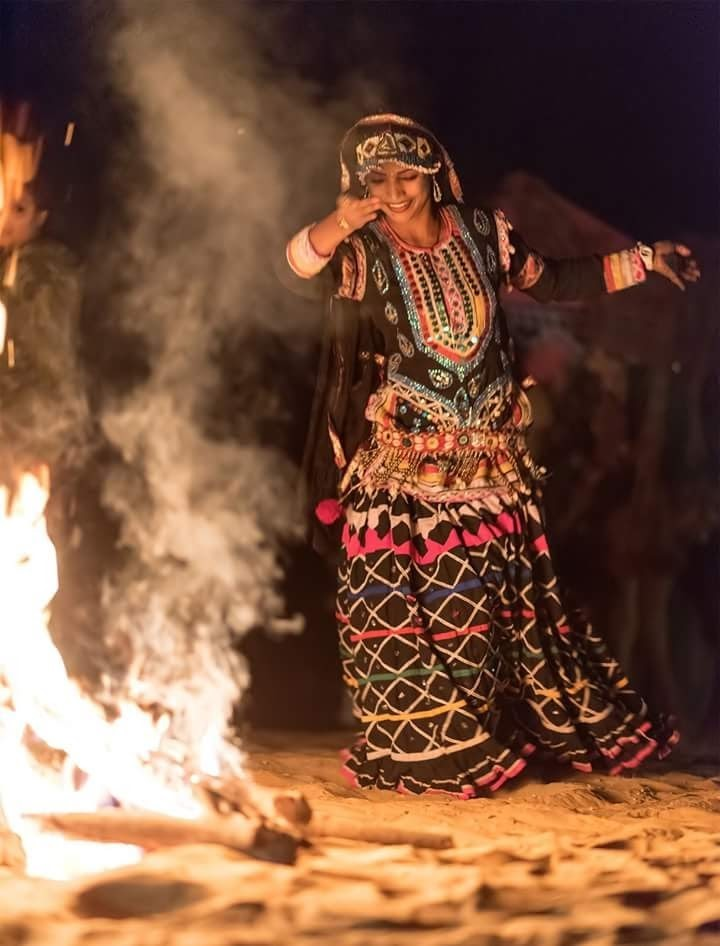
A Kalbelia dancer performing in the desert

The Kalbelia dance, folk dance of rajasthan performed as a celebration, is an integral part of Kalbelia culture. Their dances and songs are a matter of pride and a marker of identity for the Kalbelias, as they represent the creative adaptation of this community of snake charmers to changing socio-economic conditions and their own role in rural Rajasthani society.

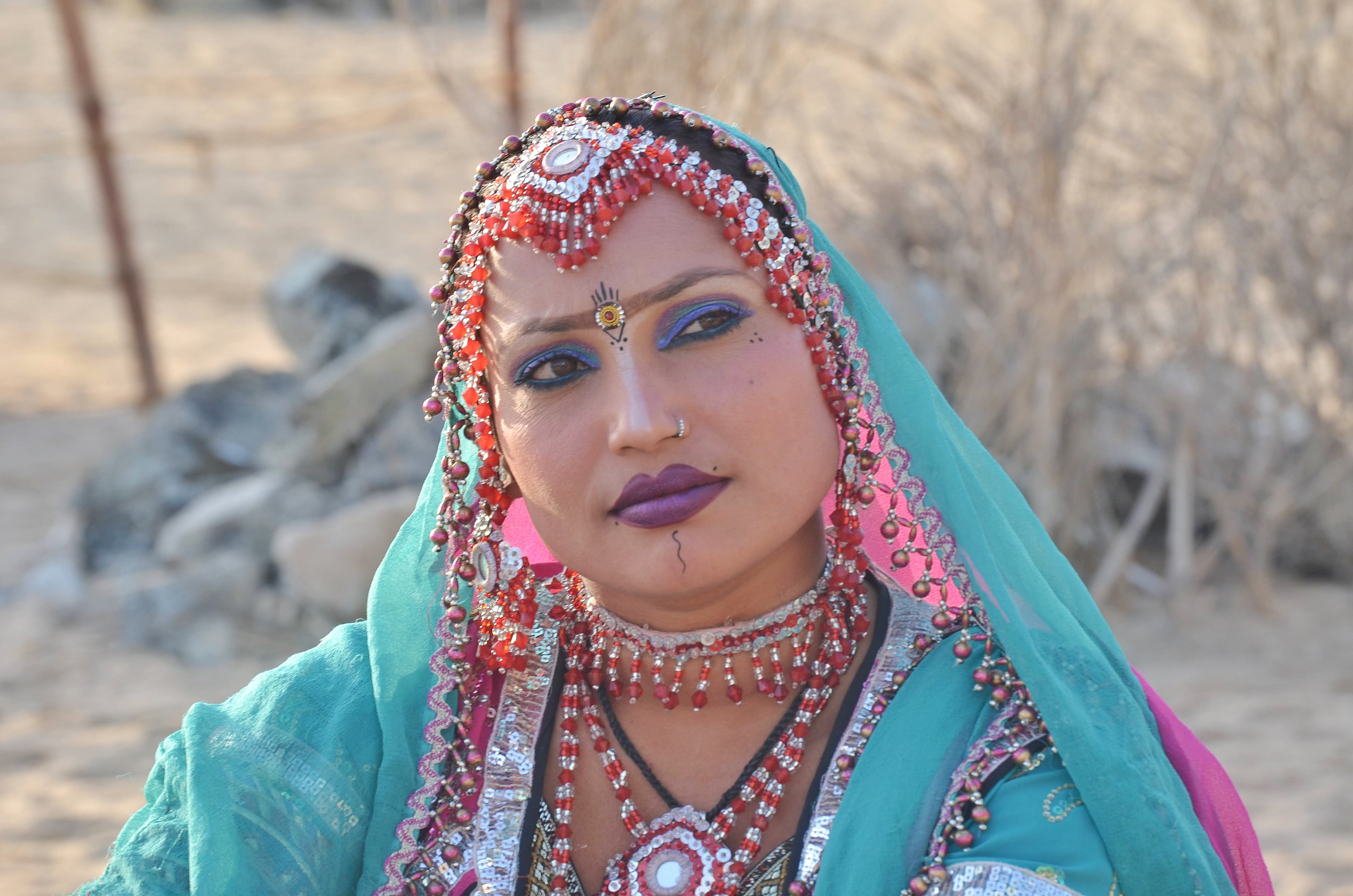
An image of a dancer belonging to the Kalbelia tribe from Rajasthan, India

The dancers are women in flowing black skirts who dance and twirl, replicating the movements of a serpent. They wear an upper body cloth called an angrakhi and a headcloth known as the odhani; the lower body cloth is called a lehenga. All these clothes are of mixed red and black hues and embroidered.

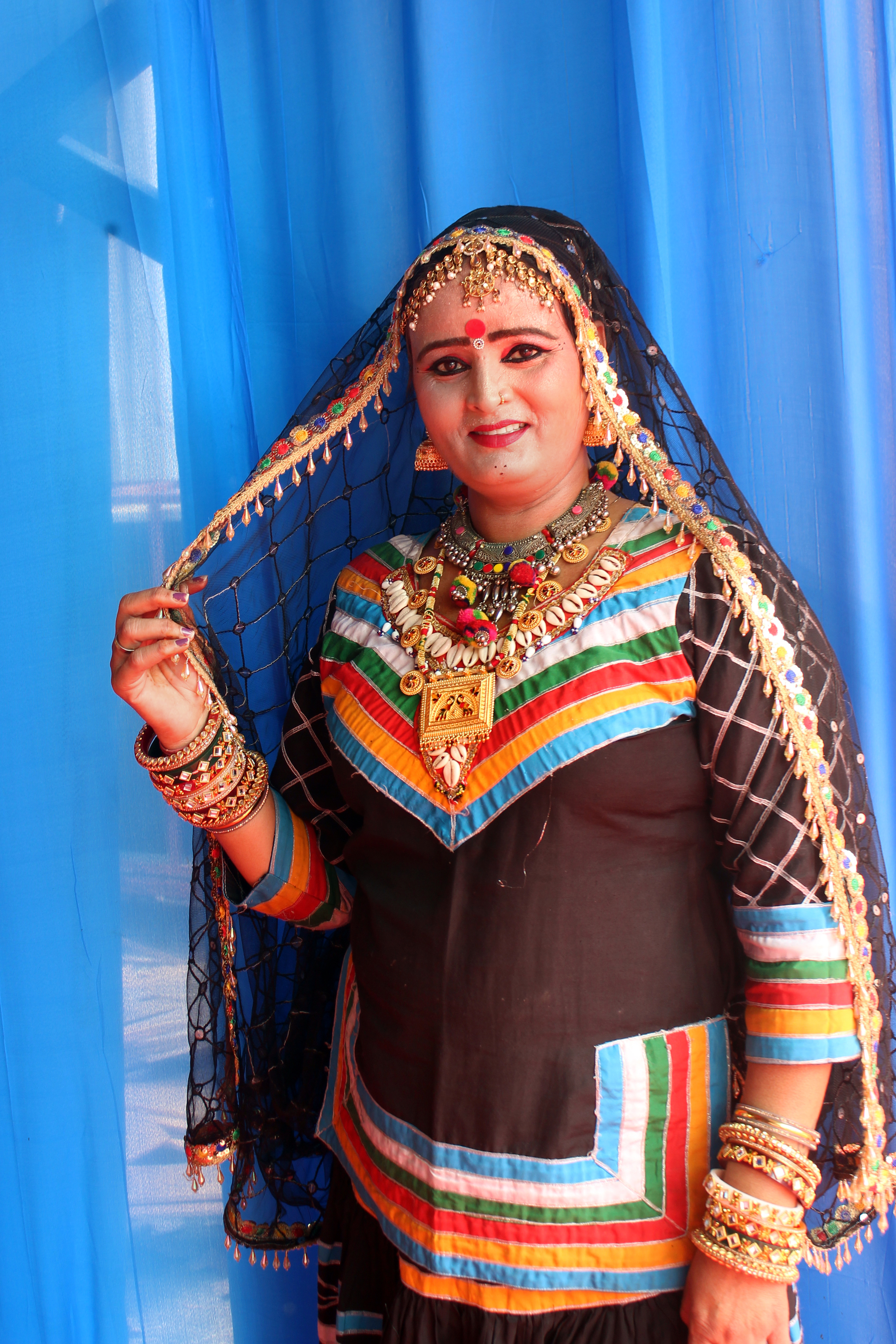
Rajasthani Kalbelia dancer

The male participants play musical instruments, such as the pungi, a woodwind instrument traditionally played to capture snakes, the dufli, been, the khanjari - a percussion instrument, morchang, khuralio and the dholak to create the rhythm on which the dancers perform. The dancers are tattooed in traditional designs and wear jewelry and garments richly embroidered with small mirrors and silver threads. As the performance progresses, the rhythm becomes faster and faster and so does the dance.

Kalbelia songs are based on stories taken from folklore and mythology and special dances are performed during Holi. The Kalbelias have a reputation for composing lyrics spontaneously and improvising songs during performances. These songs and dances are part of an oral tradition that is handed down generations and for which there are neither texts nor any training manuals. In 2010, the Kalbelia folk songs and dances of Rajasthan were declared a part of its Intangible Heritage List by the UNESCO.

== Notable people ==
- Dr. Gulabo Sapera, awarded the Padma Shri by the government of India for reviving and bringing global recognition to the Kalbelia dance form.

== See also ==
- Gulabo Sapera
- Ghoomar
- Rajasthani people
- Romani people
