= Narayan Rao =

Peshwa of Maratha Empire from 1772 to 1773

Shrimant Peshwa Narayan Rao
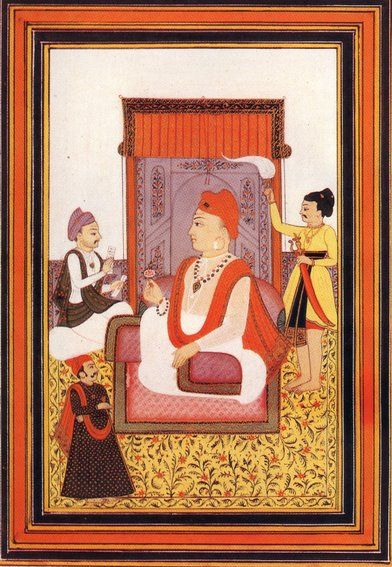
- Portrait of Narayan Rao

10th Peshwa of the Maratha Confederacy
- In office 13 December 1772 – 30 August 1773
- Monarch: Rajaram II of Satara
- Preceded by: Madhavrao I
- Succeeded by: Raghunathrao

Personal details
- Born: 10 August 1755 Shaniwar Wada, Pune, Maratha Confederacy (modern day Maharashtra, India)
- Died: 30 August 1773 (aged 18) Shaniwar Wada, Pune, Maratha Confederacy (modern day Maharashtra, India)
- Cause of death: Assassination
- Spouse: Gangabai Sathe
- Children: Madhavrao II
- Parents: Balaji Baji Rao (father); Gopikabai (mother)
- Relatives: Vishwasrao (elder brother); Madhavrao I (elder brother); Sadashivrao Bhau (uncle); Raghunathrao (uncle); Shamsher Bahadur I (uncle); Baji Rao I (grandfather); Kashibai (grandmother)

Narayanrao (10 August 1755 – 30 August 1773) was the 10th Peshwa of the Maratha Confederacy, serving from November 1772 until his assassination in August 1773. He was the third and youngest son of Balaji Baji Rao (also known as Nana Saheb) and Gopikabai, and the younger brother of Madhavrao I. He was married to Gangabai Sathe, the daughter of Krishnaji Hari Sathe, and the couple had a posthumous son, Madhavrao II, who later succeeded him as Peshwa.

Narayanrao ascended the throne at the age of 17 following the death of his brother Madhavrao I. His reign was short and politically turbulent, marked by growing tensions between him and his uncle Raghunathrao, who had expected to succeed as Peshwa. Although Narayanrao initially sought to maintain his elder brother’s policies and continue reforms aimed at stabilizing the administration, his inexperience and strained relations with senior ministers—especially Raghunathrao—led to internal discord within the Maratha Confederacy.

His administration relied heavily on experienced statesmen such as Sakharam Bapu Bokil and Nana Fadnavis, who advised him in state matters. However, conflicts within the court and factional rivalries culminated in a conspiracy that led to his assassination at Shaniwarwada in Pune on 30 August 1773. His death triggered a succession crisis, leading to the installation of his infant son Madhavrao II as Peshwa under the regency of the Barbhai Council, a coalition of influential Maratha nobles.

== Early life ==
Narayanrao was born into the Bhat family on 10 August 1755. He was the third and youngest son of Balaji Baji Rao (also known as Nana Saheb) and Gopikabai. He received a conventional education in reading, writing, and arithmetic, and had a functional understanding of Sanskrit literature.

He was married to Gangabai Sathe, the daughter of Krishnaji Hari Sathe, on 18 April 1763. After the death of his uncle Sadashivrao Bhau at the Third Battle of Panipat in 1761, Narayanrao was brought up by Sadashivrao Bhau’s widow, Parvatibai.

Narayanrao’s eldest brother, Vishwasrao, who was heir to the title of Peshwa, was killed at Panipat along with Sadashivrao Bhau. Their father, Peshwa Balaji Baji Rao, died a few months later, and Narayanrao’s elder brother Madhavrao I succeeded as Peshwa.

Narayanrao accompanied his brother Peshwa Madhavrao on two military expeditions to the Carnatic region in 1765 and 1769. In April 1770, during the storming of Fort Nijagal, he sustained a wound to his wrist. During the last two years of Madhavrao’s reign, Narayanrao was placed under the guidance of minister Sakharam Bapu to learn administrative affairs. However, his behavior and performance failed to satisfy Madhavrao, who expressed concerns about his ability to rule effectively.

== Ascension ==
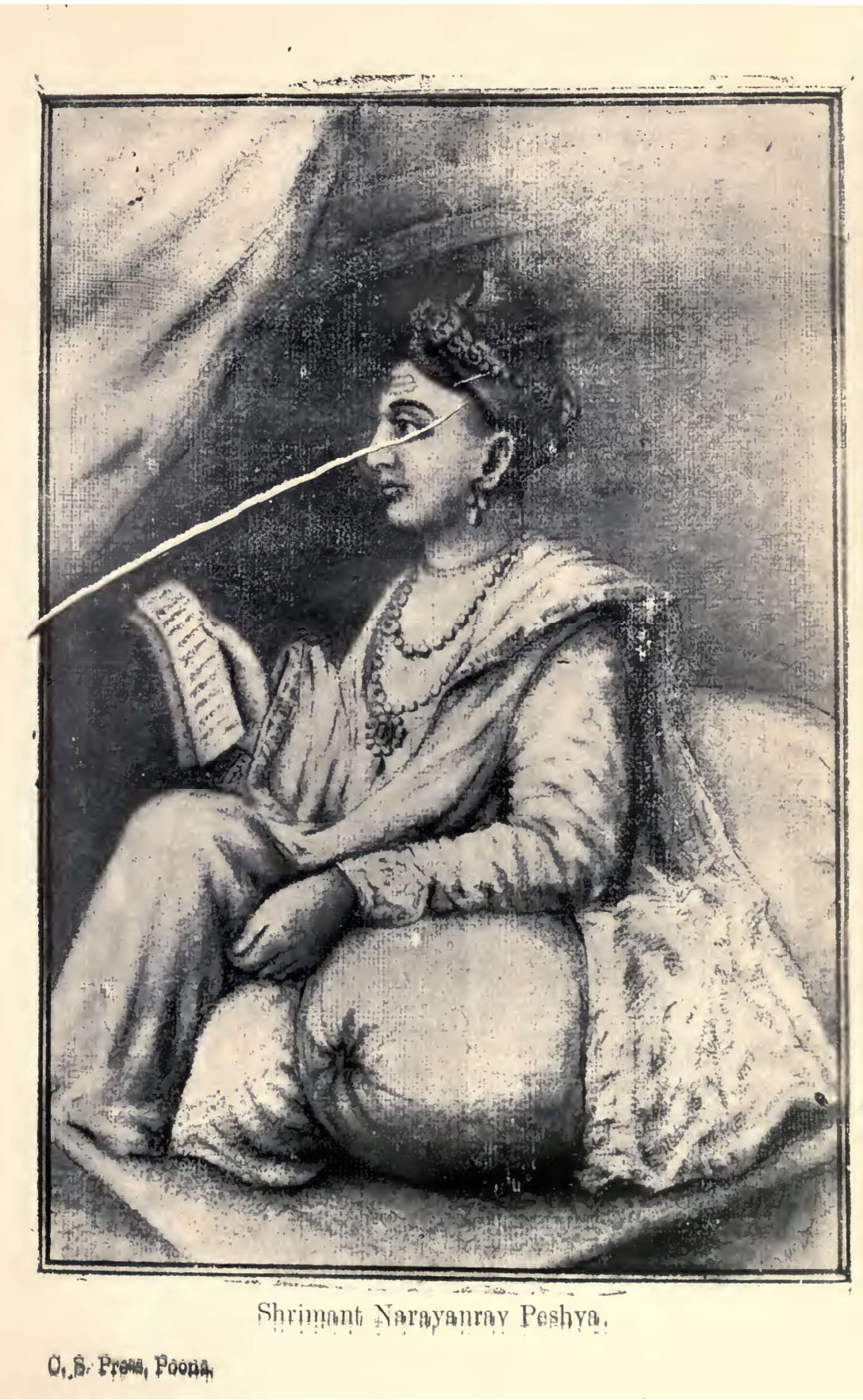
Posthumous portrait of Narayanrao

Before his death, Peshwa Madhavrao I convened a court session to address the issue of succession. At the conclusion of this session, he nominated his younger brother Narayanrao as his successor. Madhavrao advised the latter to administer state affairs in consultation with ministers Sakharam Bapu and Nana Fadnavis,

Their uncle, Raghunathrao, though displeased with the decision, did not openly oppose Narayanrao’s nomination in the presence of the dying Peshwa and formally acquiesced. Madhavrao also issued written orders to keep Raghunathrao under confinement to prevent him from interfering in political matters. Raghunathrao attempted to escape shortly before Madhavrao’s death but was recaptured and returned to custody.

Madhavrao died on 18 November 1772. His funeral rites were performed at Theur, after which the court returned to Pune on 2 December. Subsequently, Narayanrao traveled to Satara to receive the ceremonial robes of investiture from Chhatrapati Rajaram II.

Before Narayanrao’s departure, Raghunathrao demanded either permission to accompany him to Satara or to be granted an independent fief of ₹25 lakh annually for himself and his family. He was eventually persuaded to withdraw his demands. Narayanrao then proceeded to Satara, where he received his robes of office from Rajaram II on 13 December 1772. In the meantime, Sakharam Bapu assumed the position of Karbhari (chief administrator), and other state officials resumed their respective duties.

== Reign ==
=== Alienation of various groups ===
==== Gardis ====
The Peshwas employed Gardi soldiers for police and security duties around the palace and the city of Pune. The Gardis numbered fewer than 5,000 and were primarily composed of recruits from the northern territories, including Pathans, Ethiopians, Arabs, Rajputs and Purbiyas. Their monthly pay ranged between ₹8 and ₹15. According to French military leader Marquis de Bussy-Castelnau, the Gardis regarded their service as a commercial arrangement and had little personal loyalty to their employer.

When Narayanrao succeeded his brother Madhavrao I, he inherited an empty treasury. Madhavrao had depleted the state’s resources in repaying the empire’s debts and was unable to restore its finances in the final years of his illness. Following the deaths of Ibrahim Khan Gardi and de Bussy, the Gardis lacked strong leadership and discipline. Unpaid and disorganized, they increasingly became a liability for the Maratha administration. Despite this, neither the Peshwa nor his advisors took significant measures to address the situation.

==== Prabhus ====
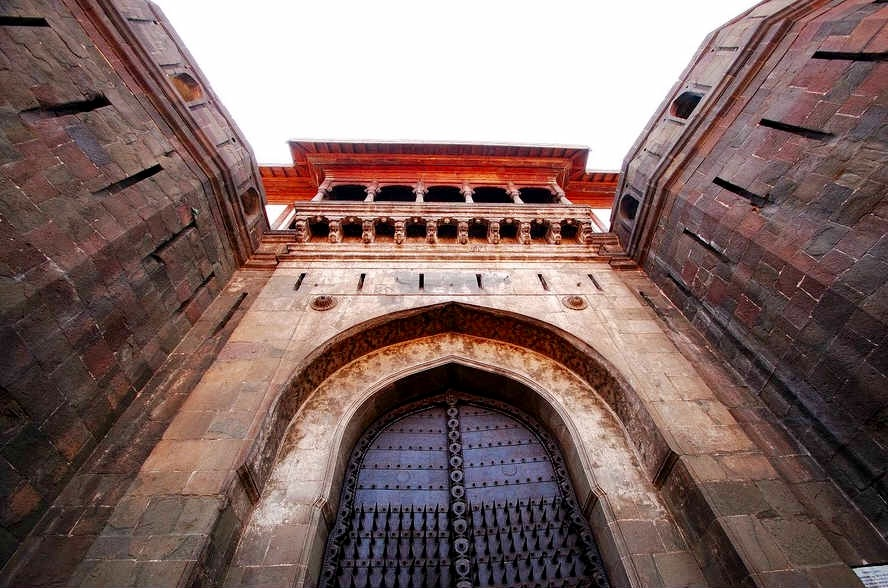
Shaniwarwada Palace in Pune was the seat of the Peshwa

The Prabhus were an influential community in the Maratha Empire. They claimed Kshatriya ("warrior") status, which entitled them to perform religious rituals using Vedic chants. A dispute regarding their caste status arose in the late 17th century but was largely resolved when the Maratha ruler Shivaji I and his confidential secretary, Balaji Avji Chitnis—a Prabhu by caste—performed the sacred thread ceremony of their sons simultaneously, using Vedic chants under the supervision of the Brahmin scholar Gaga Bhatt. This event established a precedent that allowed the Prabhus to retain their Kshatriya status without interference from orthodox Brahmins.

During the reign of Narayanrao, however, the issue was revived. Influenced by Nana Fadnavis and orthodox Brahmin opinion, Narayanrao reduced the Prabhus’ caste status from that of Kshatriya to Shudra ("servant"). Prominent leaders of the community were summoned and, under conditions of severe torture and starvation, forced to renounce their Kshatriya claims. They were compelled to sign an agreement consisting of nine specific articles, formally accepting Shudra status. This act alienated the Prabhus, who subsequently withdrew their support from Narayanrao and sided with Raghunathrao.

==== Sakharam Bapu ====
Sakharam Bapu’s moderate and conciliatory policy often clashed with the impulsive and irritable temperament of Narayanrao. Their differences became evident during the appointment of the governorship of Vasai. The post had long been held by Visajipant Lele, a soldier and diplomat whom Sakharam Bapu highly regarded for his loyalty and assistance in several difficult situations. However, Lele was known to be corrupt, and during his final years in office, Madhavrao I dismissed him for misappropriating government property valued at approximately ₹20 lakh.

After Narayanrao’s accession, Lele petitioned to be reinstated as the Governor of Vasai, a request supported by Sakharam Bapu. Narayanrao, however, rejected Bapu’s advice and instead appointed Trimbak Vinayak to the position.

Narayanrao and Sakharam Bapu also disagreed over the treatment of the Patwardhan Sardars. The Patwardhans had risen to prominence through their loyal service to the late Peshwa, which caused resentment among Sakharam Bapu and Raghunathrao, who sought to curtail their growing influence. Narayanrao, however, opposed these measures. As tensions between Narayanrao and Sakharam Bapu intensified, they decided to consult Gopikabai, the widow of Balaji Baji Rao and the senior-most member of the Peshwa family.

In March 1773, Narayanrao, Sakharam Bapu, and Vamanrao Patwardhan, a leading member of the Patwardhan family, travelled to Gangapur to seek her counsel. Despite several days of discussion, the meeting concluded without any definitive resolution.

==== Other Maratha officials ====
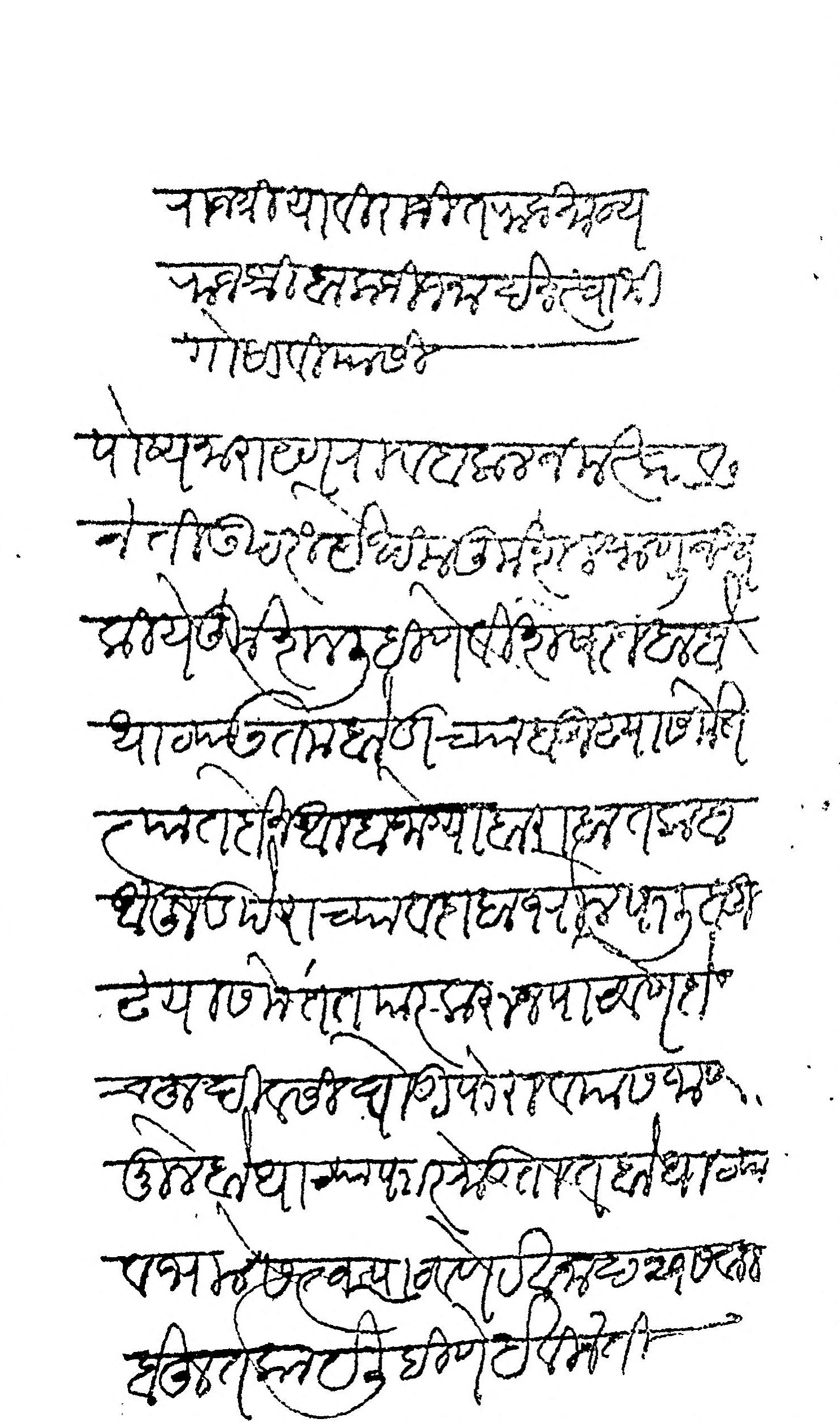
Text written by Narayanrao

The courtiers at Pune held largely unfavorable opinions of the new Peshwa, describing him as impatient, irritable, facetious, gullible, and immature. They believed that he frequently disregarded the advice of his senior minister, Sakharam Bapu. Narayanrao was said to have begun imitating the mannerisms and behavior of his elder brother, Madhavrao I, and on several occasions openly disrespected Sakharam Bapu and other senior officials.

Nana Fadnavis remained largely aloof from government affairs due to the lack of confidence Narayanrao showed in him. Unlike his senior colleague Sakharam Bapu, Nana Fadnavis involved himself in administrative matters only when absolutely necessary, which may explain why he was unaware of the intrigues and conspiracies developing in Pune at the time.

Moroba Fadnavis, another member of the executive council, shared this attitude of indifference toward the Peshwa, as did the Maratha general Haripant Phadke.

=== Confinement of Raghunathrao ===
==== First attempt to escape ====
Narayanrao’s relationship with his uncle Raghunathrao was cordial at first. When Raghunathrao’s daughter Durgabai was to be married, Narayanrao made all the necessary arrangements for the ceremony, which took place on 7 February 1773.

However, tensions soon developed between the two. While Narayanrao was at Nashik, Raghunathrao attempted to take advantage of his absence and plotted an escape. He began to recruit troops and wrote to Hyder Ali seeking support. Naro Appaji, the Maratha officer in charge of law and order in Pune, responded by increasing security around Raghunathrao, posting guards at all palace exits and city gates. Raghunathrao then pitched his tents outside the city, claiming he was setting out on an expedition.

Upon hearing this news, Narayanrao returned to Pune, found his uncle encamped outside the city, and brought him back to the palace on 11 April 1773. Additional guards were placed to prevent further escape attempts, which deepened the rift between them. In July 1773, Raghunathrao became so distressed by the restrictions imposed on him that he threatened to starve himself, his wife, and his adopted son to death. Narayanrao failed to resolve the matter through compromise and, by this point, lacked trusted advisers.

==== Second attempt to escape ====
Two envoys from Nagpur arrived in Pune seeking Narayanrao’s approval to recognize Raghuji Bhonsle, son of Mudhoji Bhonsle, as ruler of Nagpur, thereby ending a succession dispute between Mudhoji and his brother Sabaji Bhonsle. When the agents discovered the growing tension between Narayanrao and Raghunathrao, they saw an opportunity to advance their own interests.

Narayanrao, meanwhile, supported Sabaji’s claim and dispatched reinforcements under Khanderao Darekar to assist him. This angered Mudhoji, who instructed his envoys to take whatever steps they deemed necessary to achieve their objective—including supporting Raghunathrao’s cause.

Since Raghunathrao was under strict confinement, the agents sought help from Sakharam Hari Gupte, a supporter of Raghunathrao who had also been alienated by Narayanrao’s earlier decision to reduce the caste status of his community. Gupte arranged a secret meeting between Raghunathrao and the Nagpur agents, during which they devised a plan to seize Narayanrao and place Raghunathrao on the throne.

In August 1773, with the help of Lakshman Kashi, Raghunathrao attempted to escape under cover of night. The attempt failed: Raghunathrao was captured and returned to custody, while Lakshman Kashi managed to flee Pune.

Following this incident, Narayanrao tightened the terms of his uncle’s confinement. Raghunathrao was forbidden to leave his quarters, his luxuries were withdrawn, and even his daily rituals—such as praying in the open air while facing the sun—were prohibited. Unlike Madhavrao, who had carefully avoided provoking his uncle and had managed his supporters with tact, Narayanrao lacked such restraint, allowing his opponents to rally around Raghunathrao.

==== Third attempt to escape ====
Raghunathrao also gained the sympathy of Appaji Ram, the ambassador of Hyder Ali in Pune, who persuaded his ruler to support Raghunathrao’s cause. When Narayanrao learned of this plan, he further tightened his uncle’s confinement, forbidding visits from friends or servants.

Raghunathrao then declared that he would starve himself to death, so that his demise could be blamed on his nephew. For eighteen days, he subsisted only on two ounces of deer milk per day. Eventually, weakened by hunger, he compelled Narayanrao to relent. The Peshwa agreed to grant his uncle a district, five forts, and a jagir worth ₹12 lakh per annum, provided that leading Maratha chieftains would stand surety for his good behavior.

== Foreign policy ==
=== Resettlement of old allies ===
In 1771, the Marathas under Mahadji Shinde recaptured Delhi and reestablished Maratha influence in northern parts of the Indian subcontinent. Mahadji Shinde and other Maratha chiefs subsequently remained occupied with managing the administration of Delhi and collecting revenues from surrounding districts.

Among their allies was Ghazi-ud-Din Imad-ul-Mulk, who sought reinstatement as the Wazir of the Mughal Empire, a position he had previously held. However, the Mughal emperor Shah Alam II harbored deep resentment toward him, blaming Ghazi-ud-Din for the murder of his father, Alamgir II, and refused to offer assistance. Reduced to poverty, Ghazi-ud-Din travelled to Pune in December 1772 to appeal to the newly appointed Peshwa, Narayanrao.

In recognition of his past services to the Marathas—and likely in fulfillment of a promise made by Narayanrao—Nana Fadnavis granted Ghazi-ud-Din a small estate in Bundelkhand. Around the same time, Mir Qasim, the deposed Nawab of Bengal and another Maratha ally, sought similar assistance. However, the depleted state treasury made it impossible for the Peshwa to provide him with any substantial support.

=== British naval attack ===
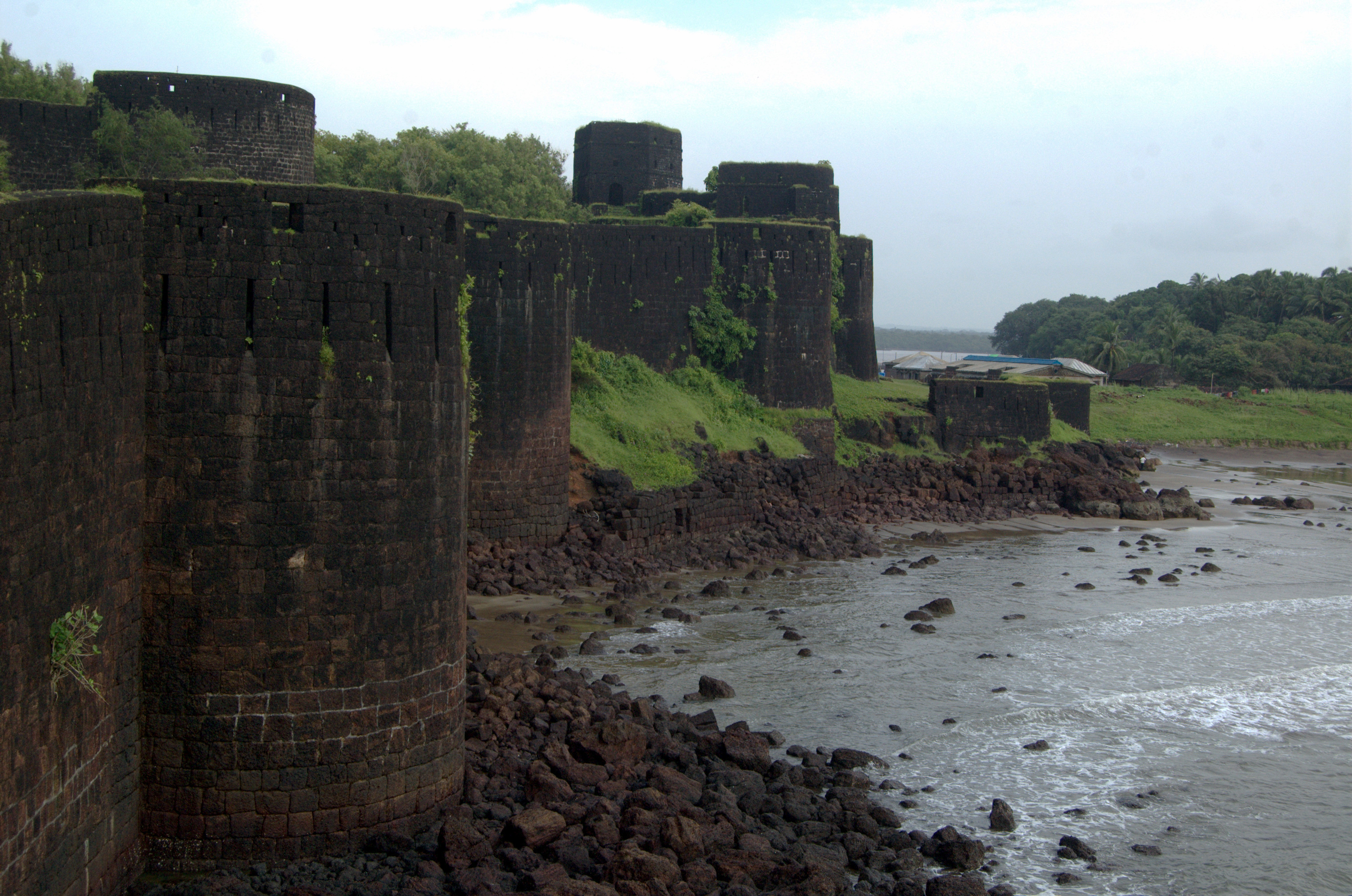
The Fort of Vijaydurg withstood the military offensive carried out by the British Navy

In April 1772, while Madhavrao I was on his deathbed, the President of the Bombay Council received instructions from the British authorities in London to attempt to obtain from the Marathas several strategic locations, including Salsette, Vasai, Elephanta, Karanja, and other islands near Bombay. The British also sought to station a permanent agent at Pune to advance these objectives.

Thomas Mostyn, who had previously led the British mission to Pune in 1767, was selected for this task due to his familiarity with the Maratha court. He arrived in Pune on 13 October 1772 and spent the next two years observing political developments and advising the Bombay Council on strategies to secure the desired territories.

Following Madhavrao’s death and the accession of his younger and comparatively inexperienced brother Narayanrao, the British navy saw an opportunity to expand its influence. British forces launched attacks on Maratha-held posts at Thane, Vasai, Vijaydurg, and Ratnagiri along the western coast of India.

Narayanrao responded promptly by appointing Trimbak Vinayak as Sar-Subah (governor) of Vasai and the Konkan region, providing him with the necessary funds and authority to repel the incursions. Trimbak Vinayak, aided by the Maratha naval commander Dhulap of Vijaydurg, successfully countered the British assaults. Nevertheless, Mostyn remained stationed in Pune, closely monitoring political developments and awaiting a more favorable opportunity for British expansion.

=== Nagpur succession crisis ===
The death of Janoji Bhonsle, ruler of the Nagpur Kingdom, in May 1772 triggered a succession dispute within the Bhonsle family and led to a civil war between his brothers Mudhoji Bhonsle and Sabaji Bhonsle. The conflict also caused divisions at the Maratha court in Pune: Sakharam Bapu and Raghunathrao supported Mudhoji, while Narayanrao, Nana Fadnavis, and other ministers backed Sabaji. Sabaji additionally secured the support of Nizam Ali Khan, Asaf Jah II, and although several battles were fought between the brothers, none produced a decisive outcome.

Eventually, an agreement was reached under which Raghuji Bhonsle, the son of Mudhoji, was to be recognized as the ruler of Nagpur. The arrangement required formal approval from the Peshwa, and two emissaries—Vyankatrao Kashi Gupte and his brother Lakshman—were dispatched to Pune to obtain the official robes of investiture for Raghuji.

The two agents were members of the Prabhu caste, whose relationship with Narayanrao had deteriorated after he, reportedly under the influence of Nana Fadnavis, had reduced their caste status from Kshatriya ("warrior") to Shudra ("servant"). Prominent leaders of the community were summoned and, under severe duress—including starvation—were compelled to relinquish their Kshatriya claims. This policy alienated an influential group that later sided with Raghunathrao.

The Prabhu envoys later assisted Raghunathrao in his attempt to escape from confinement. Their actions angered Narayanrao, who on 16 August 1773 issued an order formally recognizing Sabaji Bhonsle as the legitimate ruler of Nagpur and directed the agents—along with a third envoy, Bhavani Shivam, who had recently arrived—to return to Nagpur.

== Assassination ==
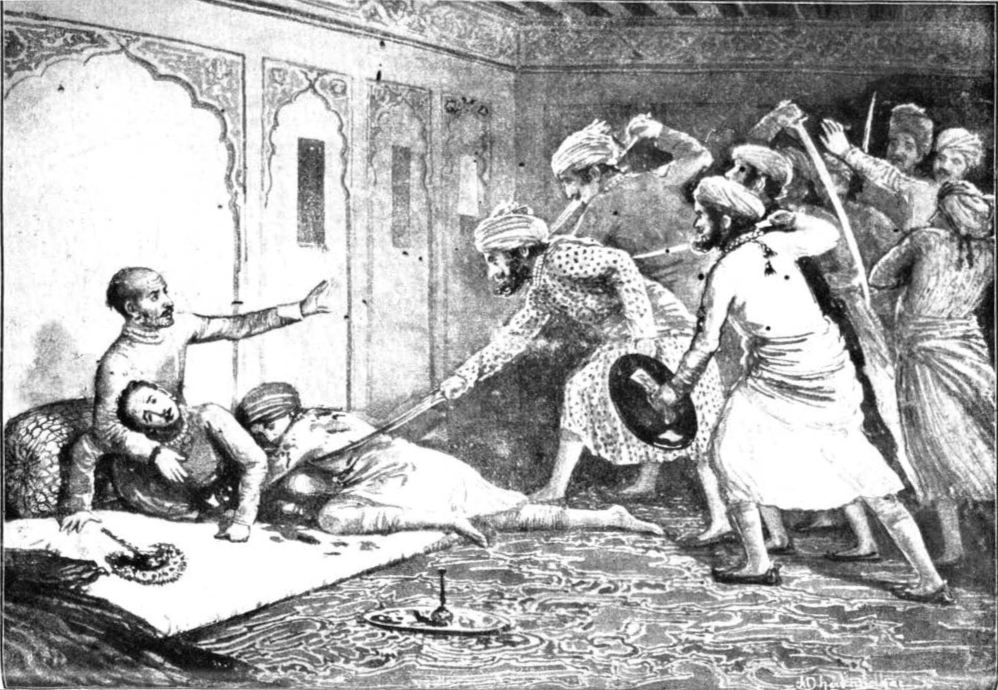
Assassination of Narayan Rao

Between 16 and 30 August 1773, an unusual number of secret meetings and private discussions took place among the supporters of Raghunathrao. However, as such gatherings were a common occurrence within the Peshwa’s palace, they did not attract serious attention from any responsible officials.

Since Raghunathrao himself remained under strict confinement, the preparations for the conspiracy were coordinated by Tujali Pawar, an influential personal servant of Raghunathrao and his wife Anandibai. Tujali reportedly harboured personal grievances against Narayanrao and possibly against the late Madhavrao I as well; whether these wrongs were real or imagined, they motivated him to play a central role in the plot.

While earlier plans had aimed merely to capture Narayanrao, the revised scheme called for his assassination. The conspirators operated under the belief that Sakharam Bapu—one of the most senior officials of the Peshwa government—would remain neutral in the event of such a coup.

=== Legal consequences ===
Ram Shastri, the Nyayadhish ("Chief Justice") of the Maratha Empire, reportedly began investigating the murder of Narayanrao immediately after the incident, despite opposition from Raghunathrao.

The investigation lasted approximately six weeks and followed established judicial procedures. Shastri concluded that Raghunathrao was the principal culprit, along with around fifty others implicated in the murder (forty-nine men and one female servant). Of the forty-nine men, thirteen were Gardis (eight Hindu and five Muslim), twenty-six were Brahmins, three were Prabhus, and seven were Marathas. The twenty-six Brahmins largely functioned as clerks, assisting in planning and executing the plot. The three Prabhus—Vyankatrao Kashi, his brother Laxman Kashi, and Sakharam Hari Gupte—were identified as playing prominent roles.

When Shastri confronted Raghunathrao, the latter attempted to downplay the murder as a private matter and urged Shastri not to intervene. Shastri, undeterred, declared Raghunathrao as the main perpetrator, demonstrating the authority of the judiciary in a well-governed state. Nevertheless, Raghunathrao subsequently dismissed Shastri from his office, prompting him to return to his native village.

==== Barbhais Council ====
During the investigation led by Ram Shastri, Sakharam Bapu took measures to ensure the safety of Gangabai, the pregnant widow of Narayanrao. Her potential offspring would determine the succession: if she gave birth to a male child, he would inherit the Peshwa throne; if a female, Sakharam Bapu considered installing Ali Bahadur, the grandson of Baji Rao, as Peshwa.

To secure political stability, Sakharam Bapu persuaded several Maratha chiefs from Raghunathrao’s faction to switch allegiance without arousing suspicion. He also established a council of twelve influential Maratha officials and chiefs, collectively known as the Barbhai Council ("Twelve Comrades"). Key members of this council included Nana Fadnavis, Haripant Fadnavis, Babuji Naik, Maloji Ghorpade, Bhavanrao Pratinidhi, the Raste and Patwardhan families, along with Mahadji Shinde and Tukoji Holkar.

=== Raghunathrao's short lived government ===
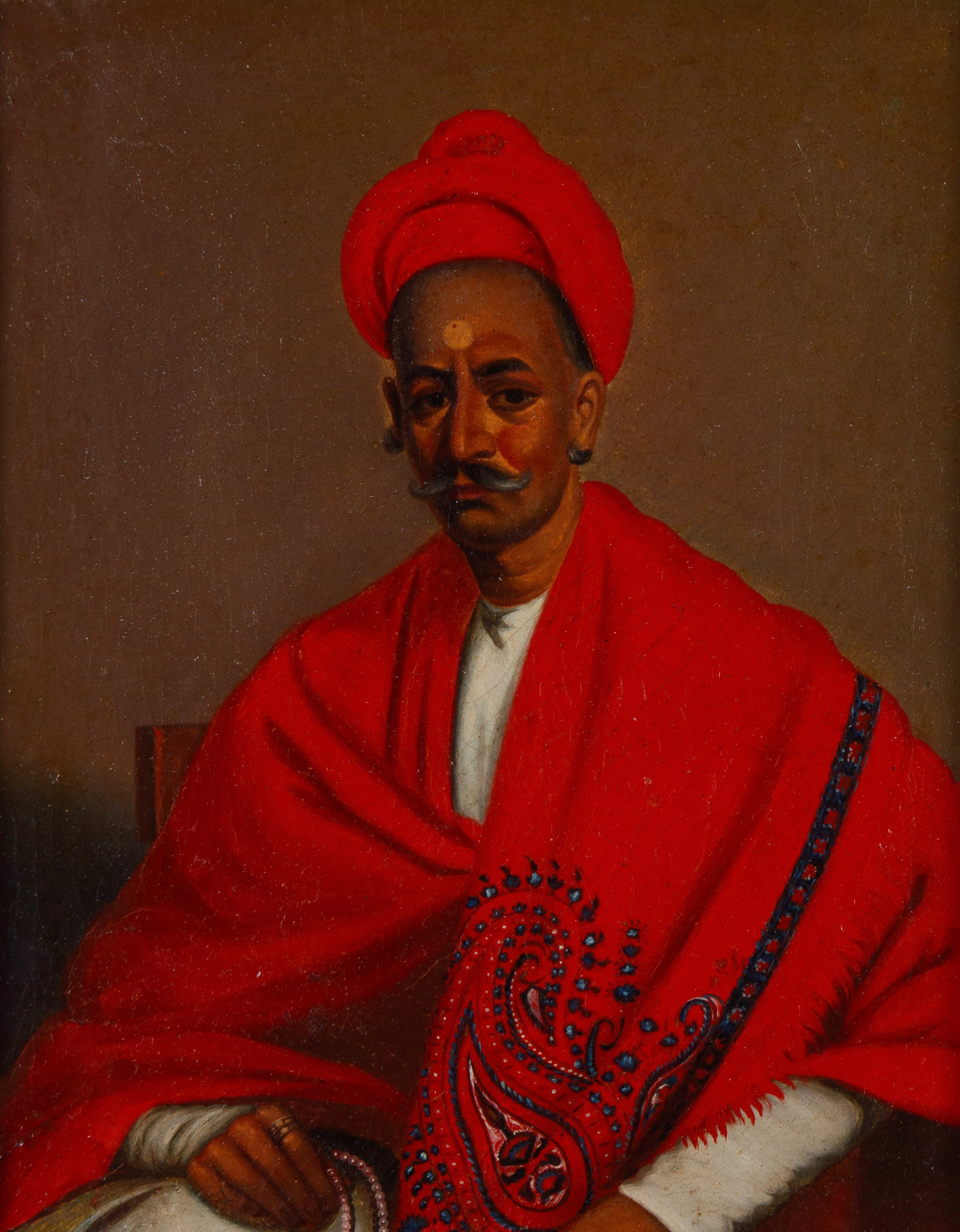
Nana Fadnavis was one of the prominent leaders of the Barbhais Council which deposed Raghunathrao

Following his ascension, Raghunathrao struggled to gain the support of senior ministers such as Sakharam Bapu and Nana Fadnavis. Consequently, he initially relied on Chinto Vithal and Moroba Fadnavis to administer the state. The two agents sent from Nagpur continued to support him: Lakshman Kashi was dispatched to invite Mudhoji Bhonsle to Pune with his forces, while Vyankatrao remained in Pune to assist with administrative matters.

Raghunathrao sent his adopted son Amrutrao to Satara to procure the ceremonial robes from Chhatrapati Rajaram II, which were delayed but eventually received on 10 October 1773. Instead of a formal durbar in Pune, the robes were accepted at Alegaon near the Bhima River on 31 October. Raghunathrao also prepared his own seal, deliberately omitting Rajaram’s name, considering it inauspicious.

During the Dassahra festival of 25 September 1773, Raghunathrao faced multiple challenges, including threats from Haidar Ali and Nizam Ali, as well as pressure from the powerful Gardi chiefs, who sought financial gain. He appointed Bhavanrao Pratinidhi to negotiate with the Gardis, who were paid ₹5 lakh and an additional ₹3 lakh for three forts they demanded. The Gardis threatened to depose Raghunathrao in favor of Ali Bahadur, the grandson of Baji Rao I, if their demands were not met. Raghunathrao also issued a written order guaranteeing their protection.

As a result, Raghunathrao’s support base consisted primarily of lower-ranking officials and secondary allies, including the Gardi chiefs, Sakharam Hari, Sadashiv Ramchandra, Vyankatrao Kashi, Abaji Mahadev, Tulaji Pawar, Moroba Fadnavis, Maloji Ghorpade, Govindrao Gaikwad, Manaji Phadke, and Mudhoji Bhonsle. The death of Gangadhar Yeshwant, an important supporter, on 20 February 1774 further weakened his position.

Despite these challenges, Raghunathrao’s financial situation improved when Visaji Krishna arrived in Pune with a treasure of ₹22 lakh, sent under orders from the previous Peshwa, which Raghunathrao took into his control.

=== Legacy ===
The Narayan Peth area in Pune is named after Narayanrao.

A longstanding belief in Pune holds that Narayanrao’s ghost haunts the ruins of Shaniwar Wada, where he was assassinated. According to local legend, on full moon nights, cries resembling his desperate plea for help — “Kaka, mala vachava!” (Marathi: Uncle, save me!) — can still be heard echoing from the fort’s remains.

Bajirao II is said to have believed in this superstition as well. According to historian S. G. Vaidya, Bajirao II planted thousands of mango trees around Pune and made donations to Brahmins and religious institutions in an effort to propitiate Narayanrao’s restless spirit.

In 1915, filmmaker S. N. Patankar directed one of the earliest Indian silent films, Death of Narayanrao Peshwa, which dramatized the events surrounding the young Peshwa’s assassination.

Preceded by Madhavrao I	Peshwa of the Maratha Confederacy; 1772–1773	Succeeded by Raghunathrao
