= Anandibai =

18th-century queen of the Maratha Empire (1742–1794)

Shrimant Anandibai Saheb Peshwa
- ''Peshwin''
- Born: 25 February 1742 Guhagar, Maratha Empire
- Died: 1794
- Spouse: Raghunathrao
- Issue: Baji Rao II and 2 others
- House: Oak (by birth); Bhat (by marriage)
- Father: Raghu Mahadev Oak

Anandibai was the second wife of Raghunathrao, the 11th Peshwa of the Maratha Empire. In August 1773, she successfully plotted the death of her nephew, the 17-year-old Peshwa Narayanrao. Her husband was acting regent at the time and next in line for the throne, at the time of Narayanrao's death.

== Early life and marriage ==
Anandibai was born into a Chitpavan Brahmin family belonging to Guhagar village in the Konkan region of what is now Maharashtra state. She was the daughter of Raghu Mahadev Oak. Her cousin Gopikabai (of the Raste family), was the wife of Peshwa Balaji Bajirao. In December 1756, when Anandibai was yet a child, she was married to Raghunath Rao, younger brother of Balaji Baji Rao. She was his second wife. Raghunathrao's first wife (Janaki Bai of the Barwe family) had died in August 1755.

Both Balaji and Raghunath were the sons of Baji Rao I, Peshwa of the Maratha Empire. The position of Peshwa was an administrative appointment made by the Chhatrapati (King), and it was not actually hereditary. Indeed, Baji Rao I was only the second man from his family to be named Peshwa.

== Assassination of Narayanrao ==
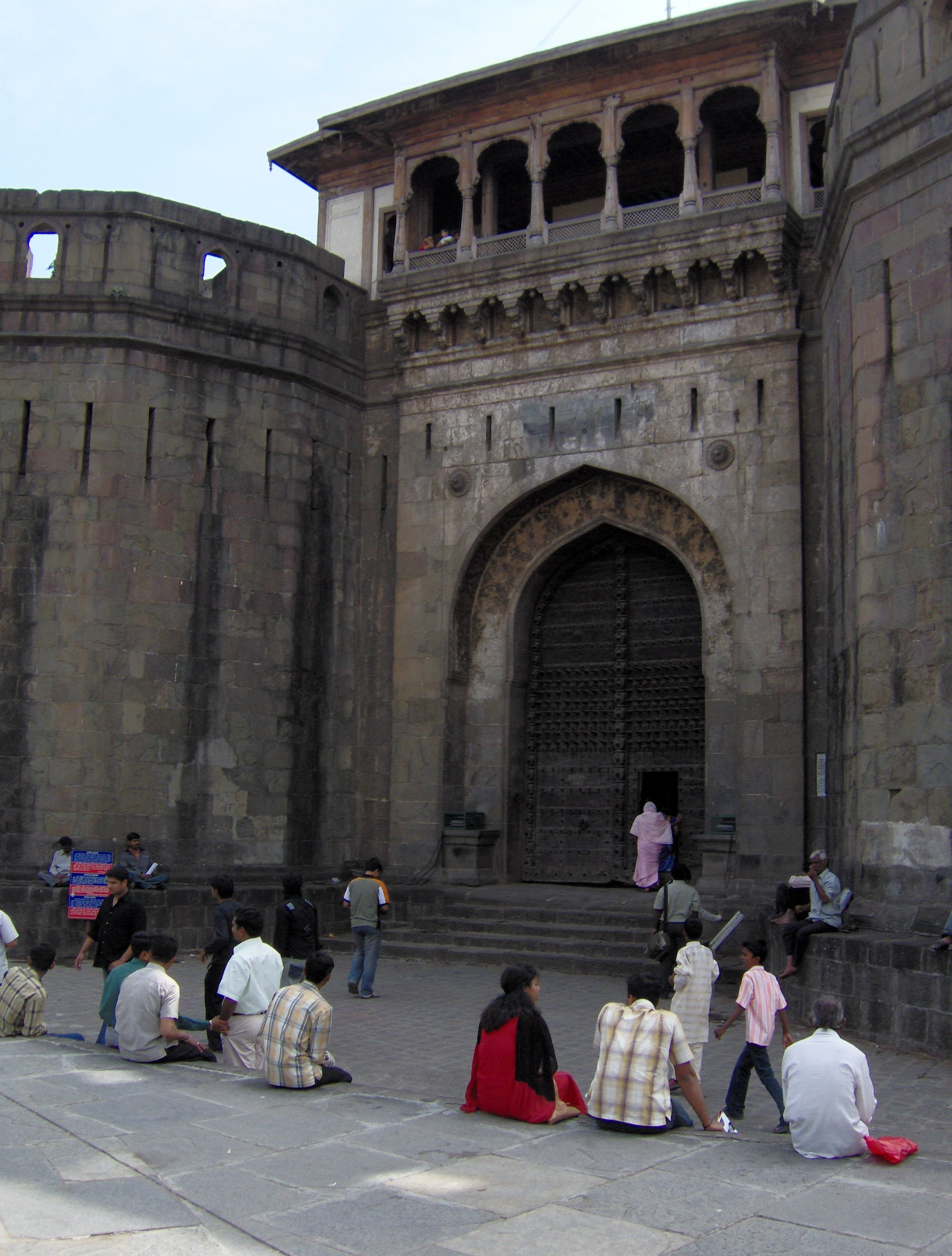
Shaniwar Wada—the place where the conspiracy of the assassination of Narayanrao unfolded

After the death of Madhavrao I in 1772, his brother Narayanrao was to take the throne but he was still a minor. There was debate among the Peshwas about who should become the next regent. Finally it was decided that Narayanrao would be the peshwa with his uncle Raghunathrao acting as regent. Initially this arrangement worked but soon Narayanrao imprisoned his uncle on charges of plotting to overthrow him.

On 30 August 1773 in Shaniwar Wada, in an effort to free himself, Raghunathrao hired Gardis as mercenaries. These men scaled and captured Shaniwar Wada. They quickly reached Narayanrao's chambers and held him captive. Narayanrao tried to appeal to his uncle but Anandibai intervened and did not allow his requests to reach Raghunathrao.

According to popular legend, Raghunathrao had sent a message to Sumer Singh Gardi to fetch Narayanrao using the Marathi word dharaa (धरा) or 'hold' (actual phrase in Marathi - " नारायणरावांना धरा"/"Narayanrao-ana dhara"). This message was intercepted by his wife Anandibai who changed a single letter to make it read as maaraa (मारा) or 'kill' . The miscommunication led the Gardis to chase Narayanrao, who, upon hearing them coming, started running towards his uncles' residence screaming, "Kaka! Mala Vachva!!" ("Uncle! Save me!"). But nobody came to help him and he was killed in the presence of his uncle.

== Aftermath ==
After Narayanrao's death, Raghunathrao became Peshwa but Nana Phadanvis ordered an investigation into the death of Narayanrao. The Chief Justice, (or Mukhya Nyayadhish) of the Marathas, Ram Shastri Prabhune, found Anandibai and Raghunathrao guilty of murder. A part of the letter of Raghunathrao's order to the Gardis was examined by Ram Shastri who determined that the initial order "restrain him" (tyaala dharun aana) had been changed to "kill him" (tyaala marun aana) - a difference of only one letter in the Marathi language. Raghunathrao swore that he had not ordered the murder of his nephew. It was widely believed in the palace that the author of this change was Anandibai herself.

Anandibai's husband was overthrown by Nana Phadanvis and 12 others in the Barabhai conspiracy. The result of this was that the one-year-old baby Madhavrao II, born to Narayanrao's widow, Gangabai (Sathe) after his death, was put on the throne, effectively putting the power in the hands of Nana Phadanvis.

== Later life ==
As she and her husband were fleeing from the forces of Nana Phadanvis, she gave birth to Bajirao II on 10 January 1775 in the Dhar fort, under the control of the Pawars.

On 11 December 1783, her husband, Raghunathrao died, leaving behind three sons.

== In popular culture ==
- In the 1994 Hindi TV series The Great Maratha, Anandibai's character was portrayed by Utkarsha Naik.
- Sonalee Kulkarni portrayed Anandibai in the 2014 Marathi language film, Rama Madhav
- Kunjika Kalwit plays Anandibai in the 2019 Marathi language series, Swamini

== See also ==
- Gopikabai (cousin of Anandibai)
- Kashibai (mother-in-law of Anandibai)
- Parvatibai (sister-in-law of Anandibai)
