= Deli (disambiguation) =

A deli, or delicatessen, is a shop selling specially prepared food.

Deli may also refer to:

== People ==
- Dilara Soley Deli (born 2002), Germany-born Azerbaijani and Turkish women's footballer
- Xenia Deli (born 1989), Moldovan-American model
- Simon Deli (born 1991), Ivorian professional footballer
- Francesco Deli (born 1994), Italian professional football
- Rita Deli (born 1972), former Hungarian team handball player
- Andor Deli (born 1977), Hungarian politician
- Sebastiano Deli di Castel Durante, Roman Catholic prelate who served as Bishop of Bitonto

== Places ==
- Sultanate of Deli, a former sultanate in North Sumatra, Indonesia
- Deli, Boyer-Ahmad, a village in Kohgiluyeh and Boyer-Ahmad Province, Iran
- Deli, Chaharmahal and Bakhtiari, a village in Chaharmahal and Bakhtiari Province, Iran
- Deli, Isfahan, a village in Isfahan Province, Iran
- Deli, Izeh, a village in Khuzestan Province, Iran
- Deli, Kohgiluyeh, a village in Kohgiluyeh and Boyer-Ahmad Province, Iran
- Deli Serdang Regency, a regency in the province of North Sumatra, Indonesia
- Deli Zal Beyg, a village in Lorestan Province, Iran
- Deli, a town in Sumatra developed for tobacco commerce that became Medan

== Other uses ==
- Deli (company), a global office supply company based in China
- Deli (troop), a designation for irregular troops in the later Ottoman Empire
- Budapest Déli station, a railway station in Hungary
- "Deli" (song), by Ice Spice, 2023
- "Deli", a song by Mor ve Ötesi, Turkey's entry in the 2008 Eurovision Song Contest
- Deli River, river located in Sumatra
- Deli Railway Company, a private railway company that operated near the east coast of Sumatra

== See also ==
- Deli Girls, American band
- Delhi (disambiguation)
