= Belgol-class tanker =

1917 class of British fleet tanker

Belgol-class tankers were a class of oil tankers used by the United Kingdom during the 20th century.

== Class ==
There were ten tankers in this class, which could each hold about 2000 tons of fuel. Five of the ships were named after Allied countries, while the others were given names indicating power or speed, and all names ended with -ol. Three of the ships (Francol, Montenol, Serbol) had upright funnels with a single tall mast close by, while the others had a raking funnel and two raking masts. During World War II, the main masts of the ships were removed. Four of the ships were sunk.

== Ships ==
| Date of Launch | Country of origin | Ship | Fate | Notes |
|---|---|---|---|---|
| 21 April 1917 | United Kingdom | Slavol | Sunk | The ship was built in Greenock by the Greenock & Grangemouth Dockyard Co Ltd. It could hold 2,623 tons of fuel and had a crew of 62. It was sunk on 26th March 1942 by a U-652 or U-205 off Sidi Barrani, Egypt, on its way to Tobruk. The commander of the submarine was Franz Georg Reschke. 36 crew members were killed, but 20 survived the incident. They are remembered at The Tower Hill Memorial in London and the Bombay and Chittagong 1939-1945 memorials. The master of the ship and the other survivors were rescued by RHN destroyer Vasilissa Olga and landed at Alexandria. |
| 23 April 1917 | United Kingdom | Belgol | Scrapped | The ship was built in Irvine. It was scrapped at Charlestown on 22 June 1958. Named after Belgium |
| 23 April 1917 | United Kingdom | Rapidol | Scrapped | The ship was built in Hartlepool by William Gray & Company. It was a support tanker as part of the British Pacific fleet. It was launched on 23 April 1917 and scrapped on 3 October 1955 at Hong Kong by Chip Hua. The name was probably inspired by 'rapid'. |
| 21 May 1917 | United Kingdom | Fortol | Scrapped | The ship was built by Mcmillan at Dumbarton. Off Charlestown, while Fortol was receiving fuel oil from HMS Campainia on 19 August 1947, two crew left the ship in a two-seated canoe. They were both seen floating in Forth. One died from accidental drowning while the other seaman was rescued and taken to hospital. There was no sign of the canoe. This was reported by the Evening Telegraph the following day. The ship was scrapped on 6 August 1958 at Rosyth by Shipbreaking Industries Ltd. |
| 23 May 1917 | United Kingdom | Celerol | Scrapped | Built by the Short Brothers. It could hold 2,000 tons of fuel, and supported ships in Rosyth from 1921. Scrapped at Bo'ness by P. & W. McClellan Ltd |
| 24 May 1917 | United Kingdom | Vitol | Sunk | Built by Grangemouth & Greenock Dockyard Company, and was launched in Cartsdyke, Yard 383. The official number of the ship was 140342. Its tonnage was 2639 grt, 320 ft in length, 41.5 ft in Breadth, and 25.5 in Draft. It was sunk on 7 March 1918 by a naval mine laid down by a U-110 while travelling from Liverpool to Queenstown (now Cobh) off the coast of Holyhead. Four of the crew were killed and were never recovered. The lost cargo was worth £17,919. |
| 5 July 1917 | United Kingdom | Montenol | Sunk | Made in West Hartlepool, by William Gray & Company. The main mast was removed during World War II. It had about 64 men as complement. Damaged in the North Atlantic by the U-152 on 21 May 1942, on its way to Freetown; the next day, it was deliberately sunk by friendly fire from the corvette HMS Woodruff. Named after Montenegro. |
| 7 July 1917 | United Kingdom | Serbol | Scrapped | On 20 September 1930 - HMS Danae and RFA Serbol were thanked by the Government of the Dominican Republic after they provided assistance and supplies after a hurricane hit San Domingo. This was reported in the Scotsman newspaper. Out of service on 26 August 1953 in Malta, and was moved from West Mud Mooring to Mill Bay Docks, Devonport on 4 March 1958, but was moved back on 11 March 1958. It arrived at Blyth from Devonport on 30 June 1958 and scrapped by Hughes Bolckow Shipbreaking Co Limited. Named after Serbia |
| 4 September 1917 | United Kingdom | Prestol | Scrapped | The ship was built in Old Kilpatrick by Napier & Miller. It arrived at St David's Harbour, Inverkeithing, on 8 June 1958 at to be broken up by James A White & Co. Ltd. Probably named after presto |
| 18 October 1917 | United Kingdom | Francol | Sunk | Built by the Earle Shipbuilding & Engineering company, based in Hull. It was sunk on 3 March 1942 by Japanese planes off the coast of Java, soon after the attack on Pearl Harbor. Named after France. |

== See also ==
- List of replenishment ships of the Royal Fleet Auxiliary
