= Dilly =

Dilly may refer to:

== Places ==
- Dilly, Mali, a village and rural commune
- Dilly, Wisconsin, United States, an unincorporated community
- Dilly (crater), a crater in the Elysium quadrangle of Mars

== People ==
- Charles Dilly (1739–1807), English publisher and bookseller, brother and business partner of Edward Dilly
- Edward Dilly (1732–1779), English publisher and bookseller, brother and business partner of Charles Dilly
- Erin Dilly (born 1972), American actress
- Tommy Dilly (1880–1953), Scottish footballer
- Dilly Court (born 1940), English novelist
- nickname of Dilaver Dilly Duka (born 1989), American soccer player
- nickname of Alfred Dillwyn Dilly Knox (1884–1943), British codebreaker and classical scholar
- nickname of John R. Dilworth (born 1963), American animator, creator of Courage the Cowardly Dog

== Fictional characters ==
- Dilly the Duck, in the book Oliver the Western Engine, from the Reverend Wilbert Awdry's The Railway Series
- Dilly the Dinosaur, protagonist of a children's book series by Tony Bradman

== Other uses ==
- "Dilly" (song), by Band of Horses, 2011
- Dilly, name in Jamaica for Manilkara zapota, an evergreen tree species

== See also ==
- Derby Dilly, a short-lived 19th century British political faction headed by Edward Smith-Stanley, 14th Earl of Derby
- Dillybag, a traditional Australian Aboriginal woven bag
- Dilly Dilly, a phrase of agreement used in a series of Bud Light commercials in 2017–18
- Dillie Keane (born 1952), English actress, singer and comedian
- Dilli (disambiguation)
- Dili (disambiguation)
