= Kal Gah =

Kal Gah (Persian: كلگه) may refer to:

- Kal Gah, Chaharmahal and Bakhtiari
- Kal Gah, Fars
- Kal Gah, Kohgiluyeh and Boyer-Ahmad
- Kal Gah, Lorestan
