= Mazeh-ye Sardasht =

Neighborhood in Chaharmahal and Bakhtiari province, Iran

Mazeh-ye Sardasht Persian: مازه سردشت
- Neighborhood
- Country: Iran
- Province: Chaharmahal and Bakhtiari
- County: Lordegan
- District: Rudasht
- City: Sardasht

Population (2011)
  - Total: 1,093
- Time zone: UTC+3:30 (IRST)

Mazeh-ye Sardasht (Persian: مازه سردشت) (Note: Also romanized as Māzeh-ye Sardasht) is a neighborhood in the city of Sardasht in Rudasht District (Note: Formerly Talayeh District) of Lordegan County, Chaharmahal and Bakhtiari province, Iran.

== Demographics ==
=== Population ===
At the time of the 2006 National Census, Mazeh-ye Sardasht's population was 475 in 93 households, when it was a village in Sardasht Rural District of the Central District. The following census in 2011 counted 1,093 people in 209 households.

In 2011, the villages of Abza-ye Sardasht, Bar Aftab-e Sardasht, Mazeh-ye Sardasht, and Sakht-e Sardasht were merged to form the village of Sardasht. The rural district was separated from the district in the formation of Talayeh District. (Note: Renamed Rudasht District) In 2013, Sardasht was converted to a city.
