= Chilteh-ye Dudera =

Village in Chaharmahal and Bakhtiari province, Iran

Chilteh-ye Dudera Persian: چيلته دودرا
- Village
- Location within Iran
- Coordinates: 31°20′35″N 50°51′47″E
- Country: Iran
- Province: Chaharmahal and Bakhtiari
- County: Lordegan
- District: Rudasht
- Rural District: Dudera

Population (2016)
  - Total: 273
- Time zone: UTC+3:30 (IRST)

Chilteh-ye Dudera (Persian: چيلته دودرا) (Note: Also romanized as Chīlteh-ye Dūderā’; also known as Chīlteh) is a village in Dudera Rural District of Rudasht District (Note: Formerly Talayeh District) in Lordegan County, Chaharmahal and Bakhtiari province, Iran.

== Demographics ==
=== Ethnicity ===
The village is populated by Lurs.

=== Population ===
At the time of the 2006 National Census, the village's population was 392 in 79 households, when it was in Sardasht Rural District of the Central District. The following census in 2011 counted 224 people in 45 households. The 2016 census measured the population of the village as 273 people in 58 households, by which time the rural district had been separated from the district in the formation of Talayeh District. (Note: Renamed Rudasht District) Chilteh-ye Dudera was transferred to Dudera Rural District created in the new district.
