= Delhi (disambiguation) =

Delhi most commonly refers to:

- Delhi, a city and union territory of India
- New Delhi, the capital of India, located in the union territory of Delhi

Delhi may also refer to:

== Places ==
India

- Delhi Cantonment, a town in the National Capital Territory of Delhi
  - Delhi Cantonment (Vidhan Sabha constituency)
  - Delhi Cantonment metro station
  - Delhi Cantonment railway station
- Delhi Sultanate, an empire that dominated much of India
- New Delhi, urban area within the metropolis of Delhi which is the seat of the government of India
- Old Delhi, capital of the Mughals during the Mughal dynasty
- Delhi Subah, an imperial Mughal province based at (Old) Delhi, renamed Shahjahanbad in 1648
- Delhi Territory, division of British India
- Delhi Circuit, a Hindi film distribution circuit comprising Delhi, Uttar Pradesh and Uttarakhand

United States

- Delhi, Illinois, an unincorporated community
- Delhi, California, a census-designated place
- Delhi, Colorado, an unincorporated town
- Delhi, Georgia, an unincorporated community
- Delhi, Iowa, a city
- Delhi, Louisiana, a town
- Delhi, Minnesota, a city
- Delhi, Missouri, an unincorporated community
- Delhi, New York, a town
- Delhi (village), New York, county seat of Delaware County
- Delhi, Oklahoma an unincorporated community
- Delhi, Texas, an unincorporated community
- Delhi, Wisconsin, a ghost town
- Delhi Charter Township, Michigan, a charter township
- Delhi Dam, a dam in Iowa
- Delhi Township, Minnesota, a township of Redwood County
- Delhi Township, Ohio, a township

Canada

- Delhi, Ontario, an unincorporated community

China

- Delingha, also known as Delhi, a city in and the seat of the Haixi Mongol and Tibetan Autonomous Prefecture

== Other uses ==
- Delhi Capitals, a T20 cricket team in the Indian Premier League
  - Delhi Capitals (WPL), a T20 cricket team in the Women's Premier League
- Delhi (horse), Thoroughbred racehorse and winner of 1904 Belmont Stakes
- Delhi: A Novel, a historical work of semi-fiction by Khushwant Singh
- HMS Delhi, three ships of the Royal Navy
- Delhi Maru, a Japanese merchant ship, the first to be converted into a Q-ship in 1944.

== See also ==
- Delhi Belly (disambiguation)
- New Delhi (disambiguation)
- Deli (disambiguation)
- Dilli (disambiguation)
- Delhi Belly
- Battle of Delhi (disambiguation)
- Capture of Delhi (disambiguation)
- Dehlavi, toponymic surname from Delhi
- Municipal Corporation of Delhi
