= Deh Kohneh-ye Emamzadeh =

Village in Chaharmahal and Bakhtiari province, Iran

Deh Kohneh-ye Emamzadeh Persian: ده كهنه امامزاده
- Village
- Location within Iran
- Coordinates: 31°20′08″N 50°52′33″E
- Country: Iran
- Province: Chaharmahal and Bakhtiari
- County: Lordegan
- District: Rudasht
- Rural District: Dudera

Population (2016)
  - Total: 224
- Time zone: UTC+3:30 (IRST)

Deh Kohneh-ye Emamzadeh (Persian: ده كهنه امامزاده) (Note: Also romanized as Deh Kohneh-ye Emāmzādeh; also known as Deh-e Kohneh) is a village in Dudera Rural District of Rudasht District (Note: Formerly Talayeh District) in Lordegan County, Chaharmahal and Bakhtiari province, Iran.

== Demographics ==
=== Ethnicity ===
The village is populated by Lurs.

=== Population ===
At the time of the 2006 National Census, the village's population was 224 in 34 households, when it was in Sardasht Rural District of the Central District. The following census in 2011 counted 181 people in 33 households. The 2016 census measured the population of the village as 205 people in 41 households, by which time the rural district had been separated from the district in the formation of Talayeh District. (Note: Renamed Rudasht District) Deh Kohneh-ye Emamzadeh was transferred to Dudera Rural District created in the new district.
