= Bar Aftab-e Sardasht =

Neighborhood in Chaharmahal and Bakhtiari province, Iran

Bar Aftab-e Sardasht Persian: برآفتاب سردشت
- Neighborhood
- Location within Iran
- Country: Iran
- Province: Chaharmahal and Bakhtiari
- County: Lordegan
- District: Rudasht
- City: Sardasht

Population (2011)
  - Total: 1,498
- Time zone: UTC+3:30 (IRST)

Bar Aftab-e Sardasht (Persian: برآفتاب سردشت) (Note: Also romanized as Bar Āftāb-e Sardasht) is a neighborhood in the city of Sardasht in Rudasht District (Note: Formerly Talayeh District) of Lordegan County, Chaharmahal and Bakhtiari province, Iran.

== Demographics ==
=== Population ===
At the time of the 2006 National Census, Bar Aftab-e Sardasht's population was 1,371 in 242 households, when it was a village in Sardasht Rural District of the Central District. The following census in 2011 counted 1,498 people in 317 households.

In 2011, the villages of Abza-ye Sardasht, Bar Aftab-e Sardasht, Mazeh-ye Sardasht, and Sakht-e Sardasht were merged to form the village of Sardasht. The rural district was separated from the district in the formation of Talayeh District. (Note: Renamed Rudasht District) In 2013, Sardasht was converted to a city.
