= Talayeh =

Village in Chaharmahal and Bakhtiari province, Iran

Talayeh Persian: طلايه
- Village
- Location within Iran
- Coordinates: 31°14′21″N 50°59′26″E
- Country: Iran
- Province: Chaharmahal and Bakhtiari
- County: Lordegan
- District: Rudasht
- Rural District: Sardasht

Population (2016)
  - Total: 1,235
- Time zone: UTC+3:30 (IRST)

Talayeh (Persian: طلايه) (Note: Also romanized as Talāyeh; also known as Talīneh) is a village in Sardasht Rural District of Rudasht District (Note: Formerly Talayeh District) in Lordegan County, Chaharmahal and Bakhtiari province, Iran.

== Demographics ==
=== Ethnicity ===
The village is populated by Lurs.

=== Population ===
At the time of the 2006 National Census, the village's population was 858 in 147 households, when it was in the Central District. The following census in 2011 counted 1,133 people in 195 households. The 2016 census measured the population of the village as 1,235 people in 253 households, by which time the rural district had been separated from the district in the formation of Talayeh District. (Note: Renamed Rudasht District)
