= Shahrak-e Mamur =

Village in Chaharmahal and Bakhtiari province, Iran

Shahrak-e Mamur Persian: شهرك مامور
- Village
- Location within Iran
- Coordinates: 31°26′12″N 50°47′23″E
- Country: Iran
- Province: Chaharmahal and Bakhtiari
- County: Lordegan
- District: Rudasht
- Rural District: Sardasht

Population (2016)
  - Total: 2,861
- Time zone: UTC+3:30 (IRST)

Shahrak-e Mamur (Persian: شهرك مامور) (Note: Also romanized as Shahrak-e Māmūr) is a village in Sardasht Rural District of Rudasht District (Note: Formerly Talayeh District) in Lordegan County, Chaharmahal and Bakhtiari province, Iran.

== Demographics ==
=== Population ===
At the time of the 2006 National Census, the village's population was 2,343 in 428 households, when it was in the Central District. The following census in 2011 counted 2,351 people in 478 households. The 2016 census measured the population of the village as 2,861 people in 694 households, by which time the rural district had been separated from the district in the formation of Talayeh District. (Note: Renamed Rudasht District)
