= Dudera Rural District =

Rural district in Chaharmahal and Bakhtiari province, Iran

Dudera Rural District Persian: دهستان دودراء
- Rural District
- Location within Iran
- Coordinates: 31°22′N 50°48′E
- Country: Iran
- Province: Chaharmahal and Bakhtiari
- County: Lordegan
- District: Rudasht
- Established: 2011
- Capital: Mamur

Population (2016)
  - Total: 1,860
- Time zone: UTC+3:30 (IRST)

Dudera Rural District (Persian: دهستان دودراء) is in Rudasht District (Note: Formerly Talayeh District) of Lordegan County, Chaharmahal and Bakhtiari province, Iran. Its capital is the village of Mamur.

== History ==
In 2011, Sardasht Rural District was separated from the Central District in the formation of Talayeh District, (Note: Renamed Rudasht District) and Dudera Rural District was created in the new district.

== Demographics ==
=== Population ===
At the time of the 2016 National Census, the rural district's population was 1,860 in 409 households. The most populous of its 25 villages was Talineh-ye Dudera, with 284 people.

=== Other villages in the rural district ===
- Chilteh-ye Dudera
- Deh Kohneh-ye Emamzadeh
