= Abzir =

Village in Chaharmahal and Bakhtiari province, Iran

Abzir Persian: ابزير
- Village
- Location within Iran
- Coordinates: 31°19′08″N 50°55′58″E
- Country: Iran
- Province: Chaharmahal and Bakhtiari
- County: Lordegan
- District: Rudasht
- Rural District: Sardasht

Population (2016)
  - Total: 1,306
- Time zone: UTC+3:30 (IRST)

Abzir (Persian: ابزير) (Note: Also romanized as Ābzīr) is a village in Sardasht Rural District of Rudasht District (Note: Formerly Talayeh District) in Lordegan County, Chaharmahal and Bakhtiari province, Iran.

== Demographics ==
=== Ethnicity ===
The village is populated by Lurs.

=== Population ===
At the time of the 2006 National Census, the village's population was 954 in 175 households, when it was in the Central District. The following census in 2011 counted 1,161 people in 239 households. The 2016 census measured the population of the village as 1,306 people in 284 households, by which time the rural district had been separated from the district in the formation of Talayeh District. (Note: Renamed Rudasht District)
