= 1930 San Zenón hurricane =

Category 4 Atlantic hurricane in 1930

Hurricane Two Hurricane San Zenón
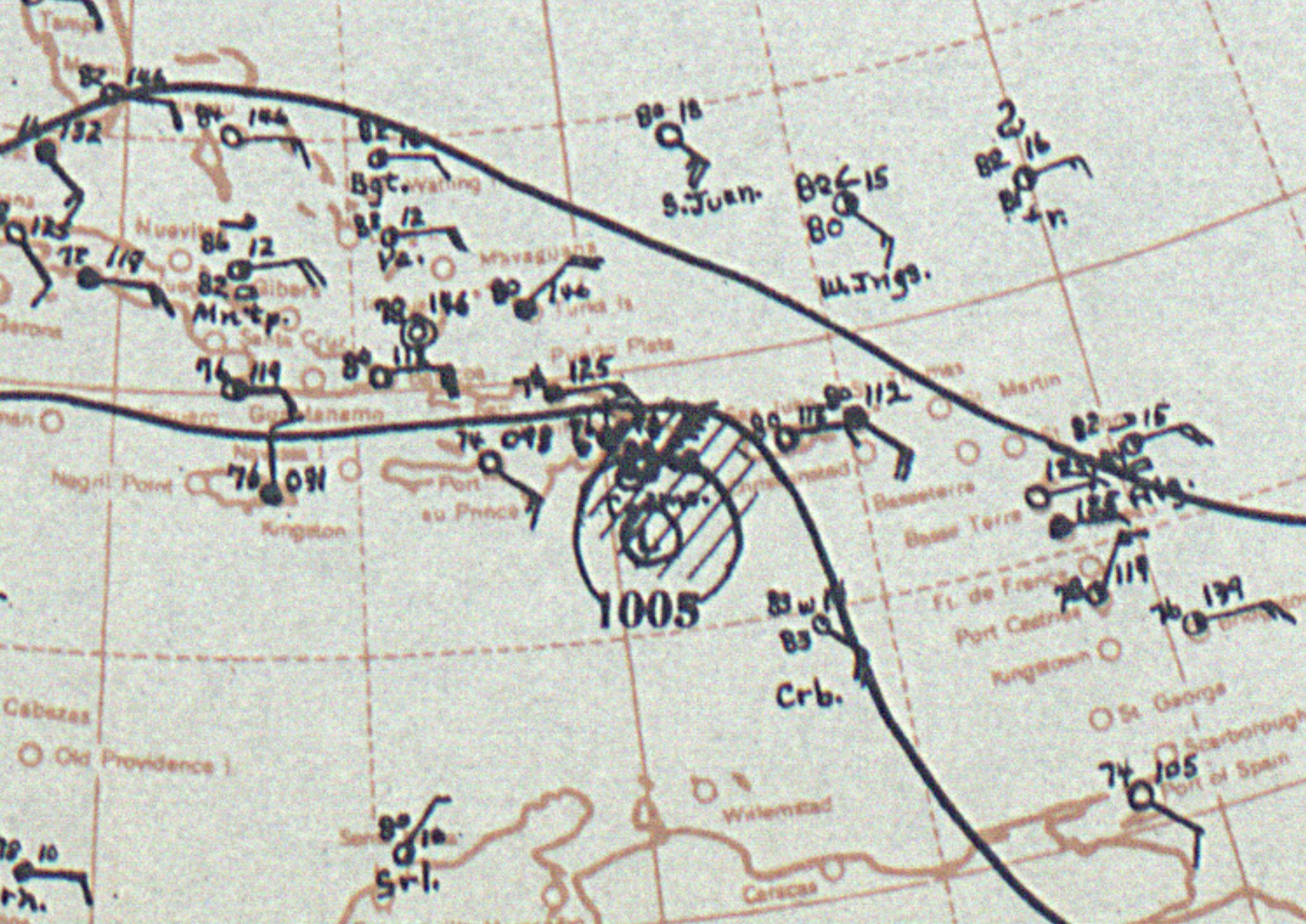
- Surface weather analysis of the hurricane approaching landfall in the Dominican Republic on September 3

Meteorological history
- Formed: August 29, 1930
- Dissipated: September 17, 1930

Category 4 major hurricane
- 1-minute sustained (SSHWS/NWS)
- Highest winds: 155 mph (250 km/h)
- Lowest pressure: 933 mbar (hPa); 27.55 inHg

Overall effects
- Fatalities: 2,000–8,000
- Damage: $50 million (1930 USD)
- Areas affected: Dominican Republic, Haiti, Cuba, Florida, North Carolina
- IBTrACS
- Part of the 1930 Atlantic hurricane season

The 1930 Dominican Republic hurricane, also known as Hurricane San Zenón, was a small but intense and deadly tropical cyclone that severely impacted areas of the Greater Antilles, particularly the Dominican Republic, where an estimated 2,000 to 8,000 people died. The second of three known tropical cyclones in the 1930 Atlantic hurricane season, the system was first observed on August 29 to the east of the Lesser Antilles, and made landfall in the Dominican Republic at Category 4 strength on the modern Saffir-Simpson Scale. Later, it also struck Cuba and the U.S. states of Florida and North Carolina, with less severe effects.

== Meteorological history ==
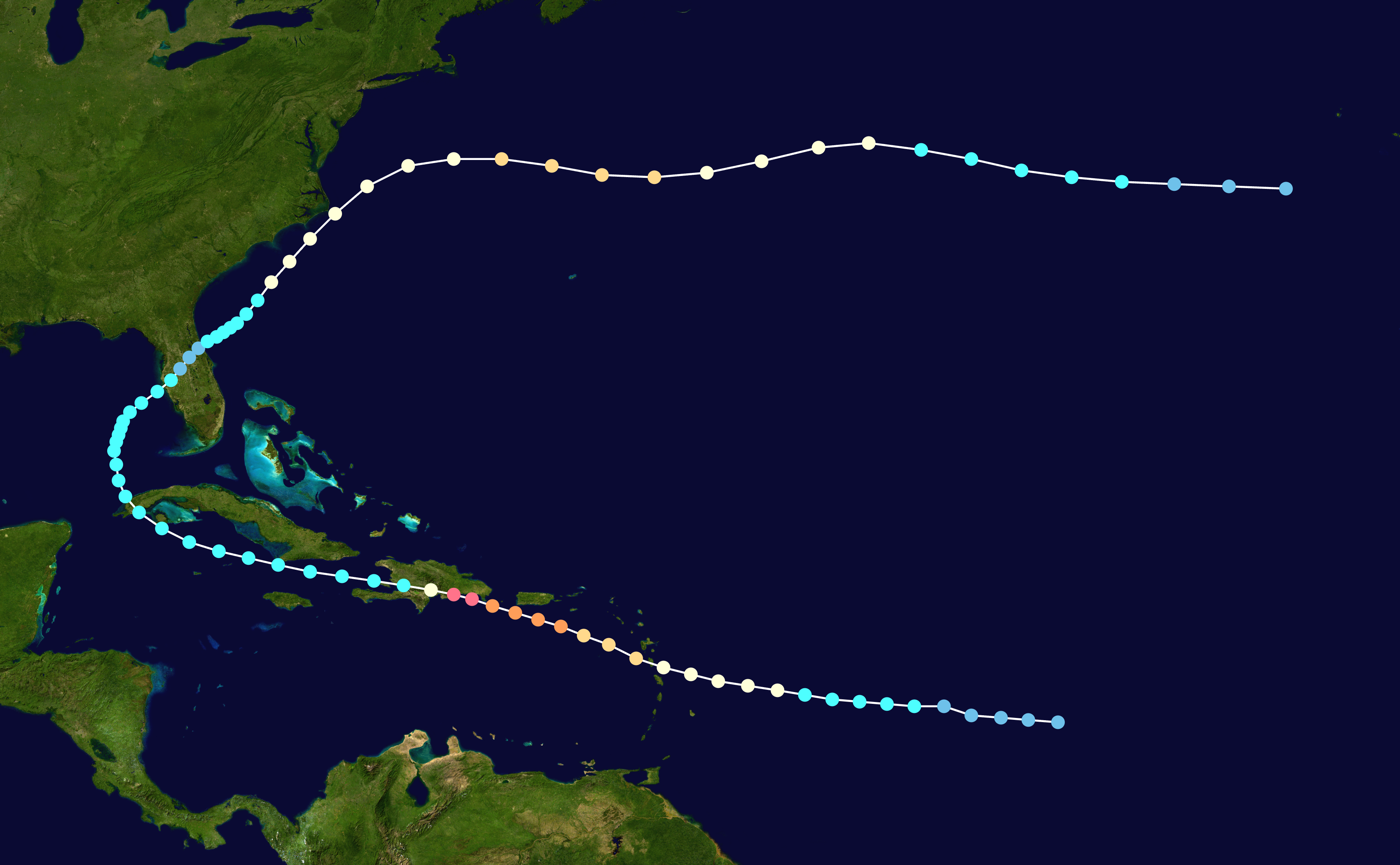
Map plotting the storm's track and intensity, according to the Saffir–Simpson scale Map key Saffir–Simpson scale Tropical depression (≤38 mph, ≤62 km/h) Tropical storm (39–73 mph, 63–118 km/h) Category 1 (74–95 mph, 119–153 km/h) Category 2 (96–110 mph, 154–177 km/h) Category 3 (111–129 mph, 178–208 km/h) Category 4 (130–156 mph, 209–251 km/h) Category 5 (≥157 mph, ≥252 km/h) Unknown Storm type Tropical cyclone Subtropical cyclone Extratropical cyclone, remnant low, tropical disturbance, or monsoon depression

The system is estimated to have formed on August 29 about halfway between the Lesser Antilles and the Cape Verde islands, although there were indications it may have formed closer to the African coast a few days earlier. Moving westward, the system slowly intensified, with its track and path based mainly on continuity. It is estimated to have become a hurricane on August 31 about 385 miles (620 km) east of Guadeloupe. Operationally, the hurricane was first observed on September 1, while the storm was passing through the Lesser Antilles as an intensifying hurricane. Based on north winds in Dominica and south winds in Barbados, the evidence of the circulation prompted an observer to report, "[there are] evidences of an approaching hurricane." Cautionary advice was immediately sent out from Barbados to Saint Lucia, and based on additional ship and island reports, the National Weather Bureau issued storm warnings for the southern coasts of Puerto Rico and Hispaniola.

After passing over or near Dominica, the hurricane entered the Caribbean Sea with winds of 100 mph (160 km/h), the equivalence of a Category 2 hurricane on the Saffir-Simpson hurricane scale. On September 2, the hurricane passed about 60 mi (97 km) southwest of Puerto Rico as it intensified into a major hurricane. Due to the storm's small size, winds on the island were below hurricane force. Continuing slowly west-northwestward, the hurricane continued to intensify as it approached the Dominican Republic. Captain Thomas Evans of the SS Coamo of the Porto Rico Line, its crew and passengers all survived being buffeted by the storm for seven hours and passing through the eye. He reported a barometric pressure of 933 mbar (27.6 inHg) and a detailed description of its near capsizing off the coast of the Dominican Republic to The New York Times when they arrived in San Juan on September 4. The New York Times published the story on September 5 as "Steamer Outrides Storm's Full Fury: Caught in Vortex of Hurricane, Coamo Tilts Periously as Gail Strips Decks". A steamship just offshore recorded winds of 150 mph (240 km/h), and also provided data to estimate the radius of maximum winds at 8 mi (13 km). At 1800 UTC on September 3, it made landfall near Santo Domingo, Dominican Republic with a minimum central pressure of 933 mbar (27.6 inHg). As it was still intensifying up until landfall, the peak winds were estimated at 155 mph (249 km/h), although it is possible it attained Category 5 status. The worst of the hurricane occurred in a 2-mile (3.2 km) diameter of its landfall location.

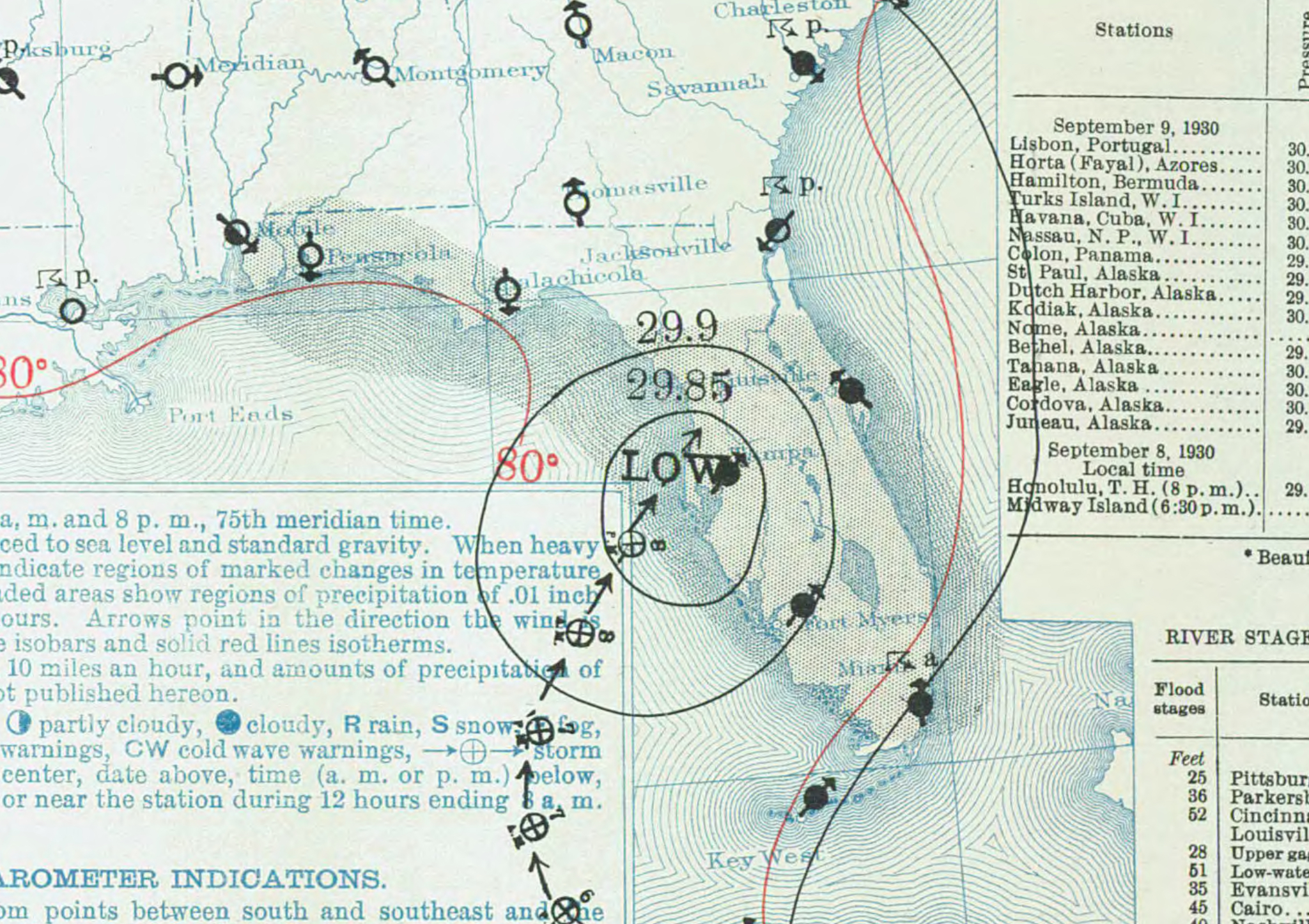
Surface weather map of the storm making landfall near Tampa, Florida on September 9

The mountainous terrain of Hispaniola rapidly weakened the hurricane, and by about 12 hours after moving ashore the winds decreased to tropical storm status. It quickly emerged into the Windward Passage and moved westward to the south of the Cuban coastline. On September 6 the storm crossed western Cuba before recurving northeastward into the Gulf of Mexico with winds of 40 mph (64 km/h). It strengthened slightly, moving ashore near Tampa, Florida, with 45 mph (72 km/h) winds. While crossing the state, it weakened to tropical depression status, although it re-intensified after moving into the western Atlantic Ocean. By September 12, it again attained hurricane status to the southeast of the Carolinas. After brushing the Outer Banks of North Carolina with winds of 70 mph (110 km/h), the hurricane turned eastward and reached a secondary peak intensity of 100 mph (160 km/h) to the north of Bermuda. It gradually weakened, deteriorating to tropical storm status on September 16 and dissipating the next day to the west of the Azores. The remnants merged with a system that later affected the Azores and Ireland.

== Impact ==
Winds of 80 to 100 mph (130 to 160 km/h) were reported on Dominica, with winds of hurricane-force winds reported across the Lesser Antilles. The hurricane wrecked crops across the island and destroyed every ship at the harbor, killing two people. Rough seas also occurred along the coast of Saint Kitts, and a ship recorded a pressure of 969 mbar (28.6 inHg) near the island.

In southern Puerto Rico, the winds reached less than hurricane force, which caused minor to moderate damage to plantations. Rainfall across the island was dispersed unusually; the maximum amount on the island was over 6 in (150 mm) in Cabo Rojo on the southwestern portion of the island, while the minimum amount was under 1 in (25 mm) at a location in the center of the southern coastline. Rainfall reached over 2 in (51 mm) along the northern coast, with totals varying from 1 to 4 in (25 to 102 mm) in the mountainous interior. The precipitation was considered generally beneficial, due to previously dry conditions across the island.

On September 3 the storm was a Category 4 when it struck the Dominican Republic capital city of Santo Domingo, leaving a path of destruction around 20 mi (32 km) wide. Wind gusts in the city were estimated from 150 to 200 miles per hour (240 to 320 km/h); a gust of 180 mph (290 km/h) was recorded by a Pan-American Airways anemometer before it was blown away. Similarly, another observation in the capital city recorded winds of 100 mph (160 km/h) before the roof it was on was damaged. It was estimated as among the strongest hurricanes on record to strike the country. Three entire districts of the city were almost completely destroyed, and an Associated Press report indicated "there was [scarcely] a wreck of a wall left standing". Overall, the hurricane leveled about half of the entire city. Due to its small nature, villagers 75 mi (121 km) from the landfall location had no knowledge of the storm. Heavy rainfall from the storm flooded the Ozama River and increased its flow to 15 mph (24 km/h), which prevented boats from traversing the river. The passage of the hurricane caused severe damage estimated at $15–$50 million, with the storm considered a major disaster in the area. The Red Cross estimated 2,000 people died in the city, with an additional 8,000 injured. Historians estimate the hurricane left between 2,000 and 8,000 killed.

Minor effects were reported away from the coast; the mountainous terrain of Hispaniola greatly weakened the hurricane, which prevented significant amounts of further deaths or damage. Effects in the mountainous areas included downed trees and crop damage. In Haiti, the hurricane produced locally gusty winds and heavy amounts of rainfall, though exact damage details for the nation are unknown. Despite crossing the island of Cuba, no damage or deaths were reported there. Upon moving through the U.S. state of Florida, the storm remained severely weakened; during its passage a pressure of 1,006 mbar (29.7 inHg) was reported in Tampa, the lowest pressure in the state. The threat of the hurricane prompted the National Weather Bureau to issue storm warnings from Southport, North Carolina through the Virginia Capes. The strongest winds remained offshore, with minor damage reported along the Outer Banks. On Cape Lookout, the hurricane downed 12 small-frame buildings and damaged the city's Coast Guard headquarters. Power outages were also reported, leaving some areas on the Outer Banks isolated from communication to the outside world.

== Aftermath ==
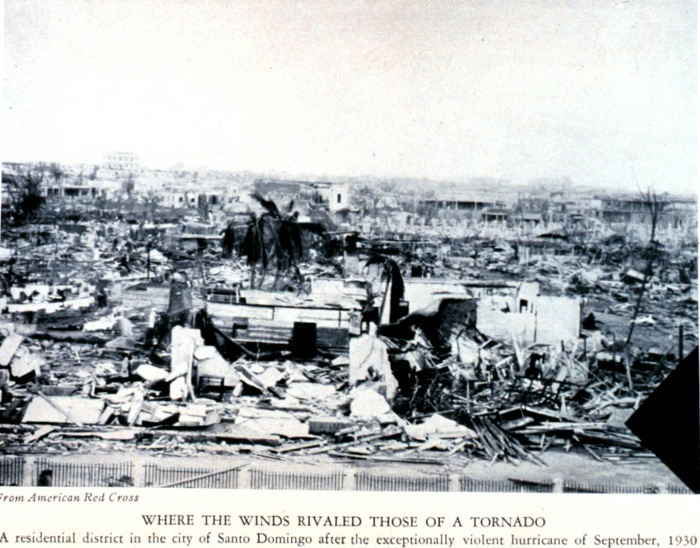
Destruction after the 1930 Dominican Republic Hurricane

Relief work in the Dominican Republic began immediately after the hurricane, personally organized by the then-new President Rafael Leónidas Trujillo. The president deployed the entire nation's military within 24 hours of the passage of the hurricane. By the day after its passage, lack of food had become a problem, and large numbers of robberies had occurred. The winds downed all communications inside of the city, leaving damage details unknown until communications were partially restored a day after its landfall. The city plant of the newspaper La Opinión was destroyed, with three staff members killed; the remaining workers transmitted a damage story to offices in New York City, and included a plea for disaster assistance. The Red Cross office in Washington, D.C., sent US$15,000 (equivalent to US$290,000 in 2025) in aid a day after the hurricane struck. The Government of the Dominican Republic expressed appreciation of the help from HMS Danae and RFA Serbol in providing assistance and supplies after the incident.

== See also ==
- Hurricane David (1979) – hit the Dominican Republic at Category 5 intensity
- Effects of Hurricane Georges in the Dominican Republic (1998)
- Hurricanes in Hispaniola
- List of Category 4 Atlantic hurricanes
- List of Cuba hurricanes
- List of Florida hurricanes (1900–1949)
