= RFA Belgol =

Belgol-class tanker of the Royal Fleet Auxiliary

History

United Kingdom
- Name: Belgol
- Namesake: Belgium
- Owner: Admiralty
- Ordered: 1 April 1916
- Builder: Irvine's Shipbuilding & Dry Dock Ltd
- Cost: £183,757
- Yard number: 578
- Launched: 23 April 1917
- Completed: October 1917
- Out of service: 10 February 1953
- Identification: United Kingdom Official Number 140377; Pennant Number X06; Pennant Number X106; Pennant Number A 106
- Fate: Scrapped 1958

General characteristics
- Class & type: Belgol-class tanker
- Tonnage: 2,648 GRT, 1,055 NRT
- Length: 320 feet 0 inches (97.54 m)
- Beam: 41 feet 5 inches (12.62 m)
- Depth: 23 feet 1 inch (7.04 m)
- Propulsion: Triple expansion steam engine, single screw propeller

RFA Belgol was a Belgol-class tanker named after Belgium. It was launched on 23 April 1917. It was ordered on 1 April 1916 and was built by the Irvine's Shipbuilding & Dry Docks Company in West Hartlepool. It was operated by the Royal Fleet Auxiliary It was scrapped by the Shipbreaking Industries Limited in June 1958.

== Description ==
Belgol was 320 feet 0 inches (97.54 m) long, with a beam of 41 feet 5 inches (12.62 m). It had a depth of 23 feet 1 inch (7.04 m). It was assessed at 2,648 GRT, 1,055 NRT. The ship was powered by a triple expansion steam engine which had cylinders of 26 inches (66 cm), 42 1/2 inches (108 cm) and 70 inches (180 cm) diameter by 45 inches (110 cm) stroke. The engine was built by Richardsons, Westgarth & Co. Ltd. It drove a single screw propeller and was rated at 541nhp.

== History ==
=== First World War ===
RFA Belgol was ordered on 1 April 1916. Built as yard number 578 by Irvine's Shipbuuilding and Dry Dock Ltd., West Hartlepool. The ship was launched on 23 April 1917, and completed on 19 October at a cost of £183,757 The United Kingdom Official Number 140377 was allocated. The ship carried the Pennant numbers X06, X106 and A 106 at various times in its career.

In December 1918, RFA Belgol supported a Royal Navy squadron that had been sent to the Baltic Sea as part of Operation Red Trek. Other supporting ships were RFA Bacchus (1915) and sister ship RFA Prestol. RFA Belgol remained in Russian waters until February 1920.

=== Inter-war years ===
On 29 November 1920, RFA Prestol collided with the American steamship Susquehanna at Danzig, Germany. RFA Belgol was used as a replacement for a month whilst RFA Prestol was repaired. A fire occurred on board on 22 June 1921. Her Third Engineer Office was commended for his efforts in fighting the fire.

RFA Belgol was refitted at Hong Kong in 1930. On 9 July 1932, RFA Belgol rescued thirteen survivors from the fishing junk No. 728, which had capsized in the South China Sea. In March 1935, RFA Belgol took place in naval manoeuvres west of Gibraltar as part of the Red Fleet. It was captured by off Madeira by the Blue Fleet destroyers HMS Delhi and HMS Durban and sent in to Tenerife.

=== Second World War ===
When World War II began, RFA Belgol was at Scapa Flow, Orkney Islands. On 8 October, she ran aground whilst going alongside HMS Dunedin. RFA Belgol underwent a refit on the Ckyde between 3 and 26 December 1940 before returning to Scapa Flow. Another refit took place between 3 and 11 November 1941. RFA Belgol was a member of Convoy ON 44, which departed from Liverpool, Lancashire on 7 December 1941 and dispersed at sea on 15 December. It arrived at Hvalfjörður, Iceland the next day. RFA Belgol returned to the United Kingdom with Convoy RU 33, which departed from Reykjavík on 27 July 1942 and arrived at Loch Ewe on 31 July. It sailed on to the Clyde, arriving the next day. The ship was under repair from 7 August to 3 September. RFA Belgol sailed from Loch Ewe on 17 December with Convoy WN373, which arrived at Methil, Fife on 19 December.

The ship sailed from Loch Ewe with Convoy UR 60 on 25 January 1943. The convoy arrived at Reykjavík on 30 January but RFA Belgol returned. It sailed with Convoy UR 61, which arrived at Reykjavík on 7 February. RFA Belgol ran aground and sustained minor damage, which was repaired on 15 February. The ship ran aground again on 3 March and was holed. Temporary repairs were made on 6 March. On 18 March, RFA Belgol collided with USS Chateau Thierry and crushed one of the troopship's lifeboats. RFA Belgol returned to the United Kingdom in late March. It joined Convoy WN 411, which departed from Loch Ewe on 4 April and arrived at Methil two days later. It sailed on to Sunderland, County Durham for repairs, only to be damaged in an air raid on 29 April. Repairs were completed on 8 May. In another air raid on 24 May, her midships accommodation was gutted by fire and one of her tanks was holed. Three crew members were hospitalised. Repairs took until October to complete. RFA Belgol was a member of Convoy EN 298, which departed from Methil on 24 October and arrived at Loch Ewe two days later. It sailed on 5 November to join Convoy OS 58KM, which had sailed from Liverpool that day and split at sea on 18 November. The ship arrived at Gibraltar on 19 November, sailing that day with Convoy KMS 32. The convoy arrived at Port Said, Egypt on 30 November. RFA Belgol sailed on to Aden. It joined Convoy AP 56, which departed on 13 December and arrived at Bandar Abbas, Iran on 30 December.

RFA Belgol departed from Colombo, Ceylon on 4 January 1944 as a member of Convoy JC 32. The convoy arrived at Calcutta, India on 13 January, but the ship left the convoy and put in to Trincomalee, Ceylon, arriving on 7 January. RFA Belgol departed from Trincomalee on 12 March, escorted by HMAS Cessnock. The two ships arrived at the Addu Atoll on 14 March. RFA Belgol departed from the Addu Atoll on 6 April as a member of Convoy XC 18, which arrived at Colombo on 9 April. It sailed the next day with Convoy JC 44, which arrived at Calcutta on 17 April. RFA Belgol left the convoy, arriving at Trincomalee on 17 April.

=== Post-war ===
In April 1949, the crew members were fined £2 each for stealing various items from the ship when it was docked at Rosyth, Fife. Post-war, RFA Belgol operated in British waters until 10 February 1953, when it was placed in reserve at Devonport. The ship was sold in June 1958 to British Iron & Steel Corporation for scrapping. It arrived at Charleston, South Carolina, United Stateson 22 June for breaking by Shipbreaking Industries Limited .
