= Emamabad, Sardasht =

Village in Chaharmahal and Bakhtiari province, Iran

Emamabad Persian: امام اباد
- Village
- Location within Iran
- Coordinates: 31°18′33″N 50°56′46″E
- Country: Iran
- Province: Chaharmahal and Bakhtiari
- County: Lordegan
- District: Rudasht
- Rural District: Sardasht

Population (2016)
  - Total: 704
- Time zone: UTC+3:30 (IRST)

Emamabad (Persian: امام اباد) (Note: Also romanized as Emāmābād) is a village in Sardasht Rural District of Rudasht District (Note: Formerly Talayeh District) in Lordegan County, Chaharmahal and Bakhtiari province, Iran.

== Demographics ==
=== Ethnicity ===
The village is populated by Lurs.

=== Population ===
At the time of the 2006 National Census, the village's population was 571 in 107 households, when it was in the Central District. The following census in 2011 counted 675 people in 146 households. The 2016 census measured the population of the village as 704 people in 158 households, by which time the rural district had been separated from the district in the formation of Talayeh District. (Note: Renamed Rudasht District)
