= Capture of Delhi =

Capture of Delhi may refer to these conflicts in Delhi, India:

- Capture of Delhi (1760), major battle between Durrani and Maratha forces
- Capture of Delhi (1771), Maratha military offensive against Rohillas
- Battle of Delhi (1783), Sikh raid on Delhi during the decline of the Mughal Empire
- Capture of Delhi (1788), battle fought between forces of the Marathas and Rohilla

== See also ==
- Battle of Delhi (disambiguation)
- Delhi (disambiguation)
