= Battle of Delhi =

Battle of Delhi may refer to:

- Mongol invasion of India (1303), by the Chagatai Khanate against the Delhi Sultanate under the Khalji dynasty
- Sack of Delhi (1398), by the Timurid Empire from the Delhi Sultanate under the Tughlaq dynasty
- Battle of Tughlaqabad (1556), fought between the Mughal Empire and forces under Hemu Vikramaditya
- Sack of Delhi (1739), by the forces of Nader Shah
- Sack of Delhi (1757), by the forces of Ahmad Shah Durrani
- Battle of Delhi (1757), fought between the Maratha Empire and Rohillas
- Capture of Delhi 1760 fought between Maratha forces under Sadashivrao Bhau against the Durrani Empire
- Battle of Delhi (1764), fought between Bharatpur State and the Mughal Empire
- Capture of Delhi (1771), by the Maratha Empire from Rohillas under Zabita Khan
- Battle of Delhi (1783), fought between the Sikh Confederacy and the Mughal Empire
- Capture of Delhi (1788), fought between the Maratha Empire and Rohilla—Mughal alliance
- Battle of Delhi (1793), Marathas repulsed Sikhs attacking Delhi
- Battle of Delhi (1803), fought between the British East India Company and the Maratha Empire, as part of the Second Anglo-Maratha War
- Siege of Delhi (1804), by British East India Company against the Maratha Empire, following the 1803 battle
- Siege of Delhi (1857), by the British East India Company against the Mughal Empire, during the Indian Rebellion of 1857

== See also ==
- Capture of Delhi (disambiguation)
- Delhi (disambiguation)
