= 1930 Atlantic hurricane season =

- Season summary map

Seasonal boundaries
- First system formed: August 21, 1930
- Last system dissipated: October 21, 1930

Strongest storm
- Name: "Dominican Republic"
  - Maximum winds: 155 mph (250 km/h) (1-minute sustained)
  - Lowest pressure: 933 mbar (hPa; 27.55 inHg)

Seasonal statistics
- Total storms: 3
- Hurricanes: 2
- Major hurricanes (Cat. 3+): 2
- Total fatalities: 2,000 – 8,000 total
- Total damage: $50 million (1930 USD)

Related articles
- 1930 Pacific hurricane season; 1920-1937 Pacific typhoon seasons; 1930s North Indian Ocean cyclone seasons

The 1930 Atlantic hurricane season was a very inactive Atlantic hurricane season. It was the second least active on record in terms of tropical storms forming, only behind 1914, with only three systems reaching tropical storm intensity. Of those three, two reached hurricane status, both of which also became major hurricanes, Category 3 or higher storms on the Saffir–Simpson hurricane wind scale. The first system developed in the central Atlantic Ocean on August 21. Later that month, a second storm, the Dominican Republic hurricane, formed on August 29. It peaked as a Category 4 hurricane with winds of 155 mph (250 km/h). The third and final storm dissipated on October 21.

Due to the lack of systems that developed, only one tropical cyclone, the second hurricane, managed to make landfall during the season. It severely impacted areas of the Greater Antilles, particularly the Dominican Republic, where an estimated 2,000 to 8,000 people died, before making subsequent landfalls on Cuba and the U.S. states of Florida and North Carolina, with less severe effects.

Despite the very low number of storms forming, the season's activity was reflected with an accumulated cyclone energy (ACE) rating of 50, below the 1921–1930 average of 76.6. ACE is a metric used to express the energy used by a tropical cyclone during its lifetime. Therefore, a storm with a longer duration will have high values of ACE. It is only calculated at six-hour increments in which specific tropical and subtropical systems are either at or above sustained wind speeds of 39 mph (63 km/h), which is the threshold for tropical storm intensity. Thus, tropical depressions are not included here.

== Systems ==
=== Hurricane One ===
- Category 3 hurricane (SSHWS)
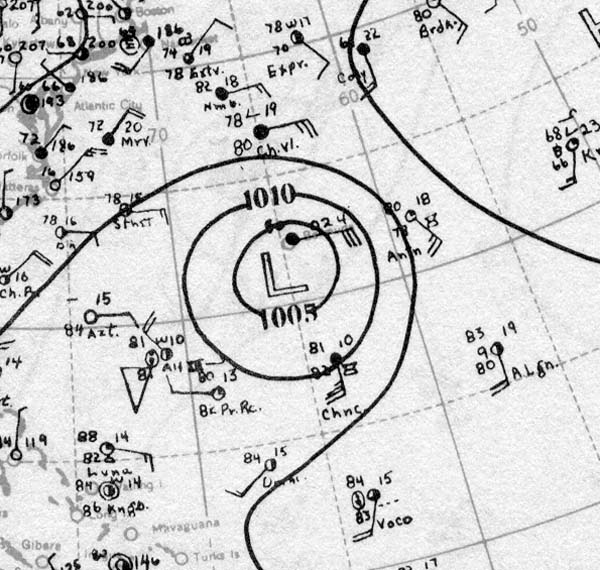
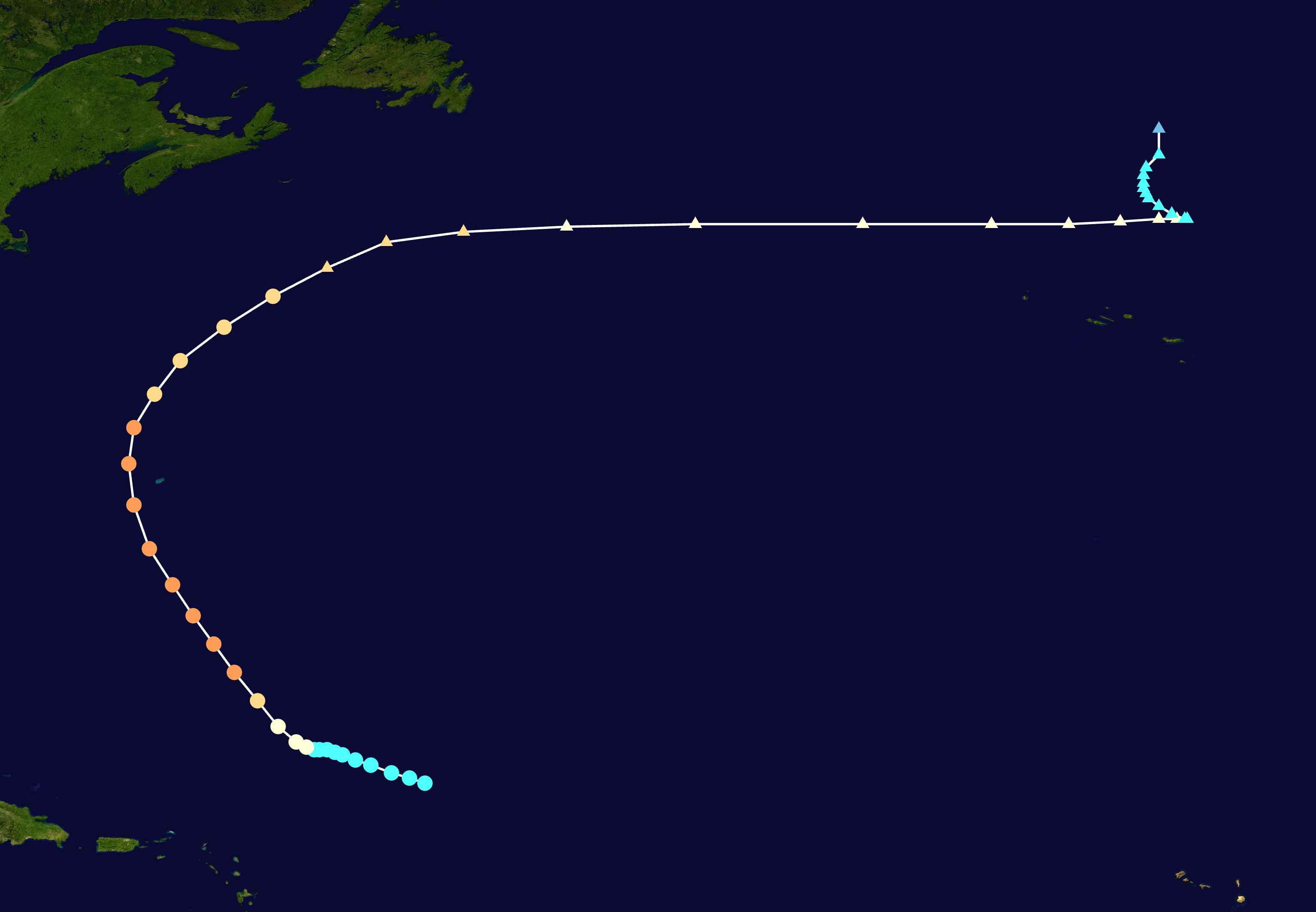
- Duration: August 21 – August 28
- Peak intensity: 125 mph (205 km/h) (1-min); 960 mbar (hPa)

The first hurricane of the season was first noted in the central Atlantic Ocean on August 21. Slowly intensifying, the system initially moved towards the west. On August 22, a steamship in the vicinity sustained some structural damage. After attaining hurricane strength on August 24, the system turned northwestward, and reached Category 3 intensity on August 25 with maximum sustained winds of 125 mph (205 km/h) as it grazed Bermuda. Recurving to the northeast, the French transatlantic ocean liner SS Paris encountered the hurricane while it was a Category 2 hurricane. A large wave struck the ship, shattering glass on the vessel and injuring 40 passengers. Although still a Category 2 hurricane, the system became extratropical shortly after on August 28. The extratropical storm was tracked due east towards the Azores for a few days while gradually weakening before abruptly turning to the north and dissipating.

=== Hurricane Two ===
- Category 4 hurricane (SSHWS)
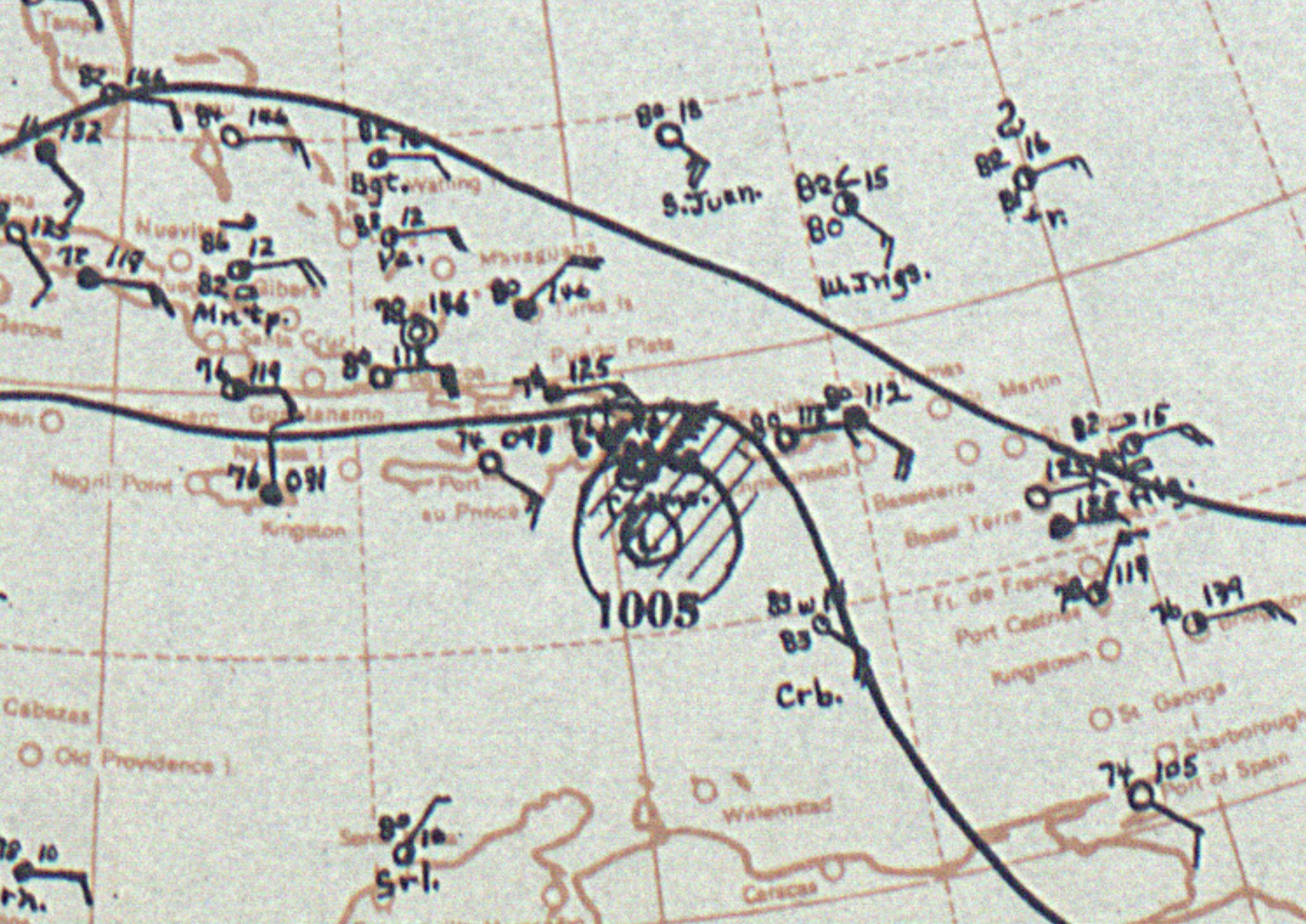
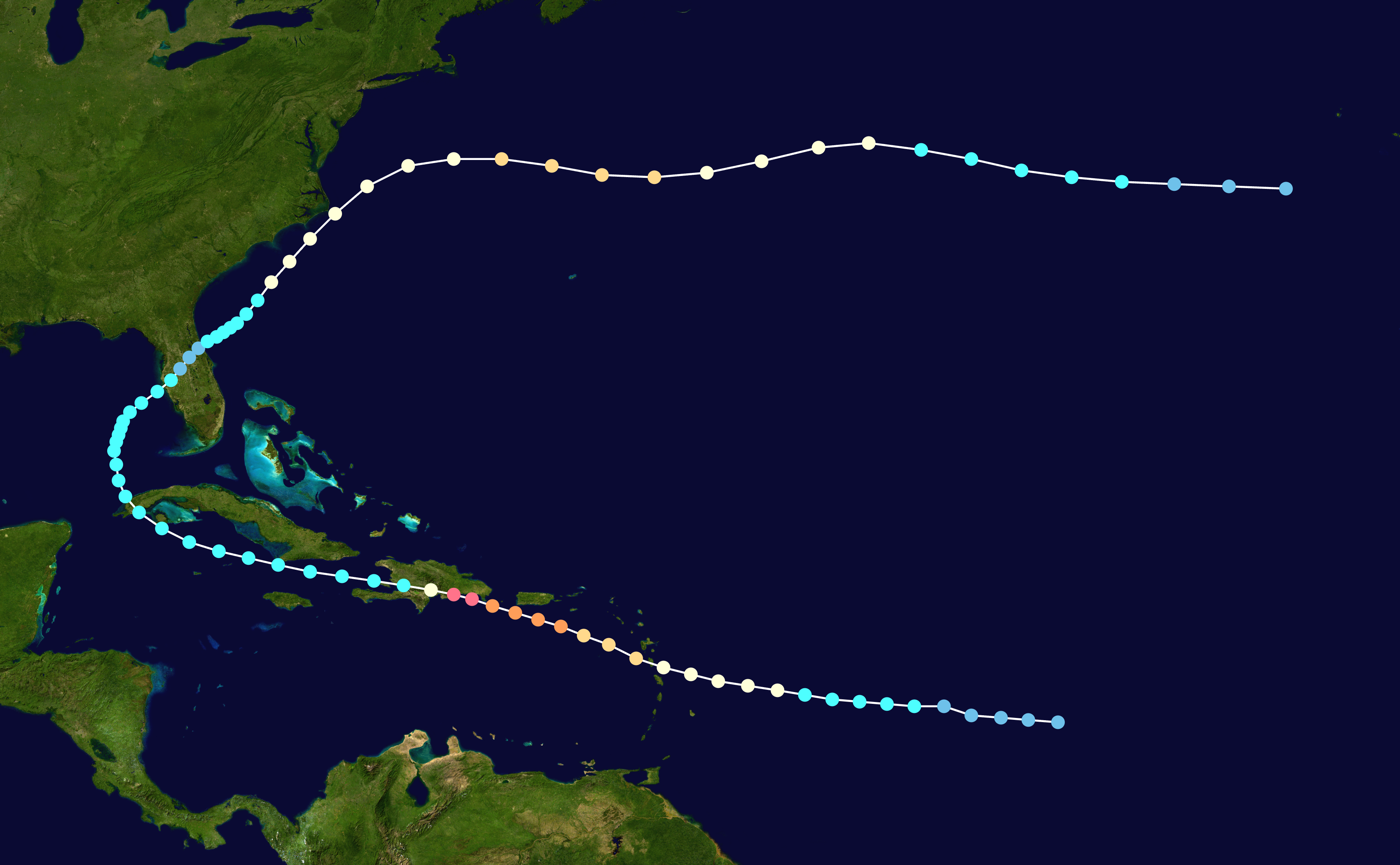
- Duration: August 29 – September 17
- Peak intensity: 155 mph (250 km/h) (1-min); 933 mbar (hPa)

The Dominican Republic Hurricane of 1930

A tropical depression developed well east of the Lesser Antilles on August 29. Initially drifting westward, the storm gradually intensified and became a tropical storm early the next day. By August 31, the system strengthened into a Category 1 hurricane. The next day, the hurricane entered the Caribbean Sea, passing the island of Dominica as a Category 2 hurricane. Continuing to intensify, the storm further intensified into a Category 3 hurricane on September 2 and then to a Category 4 the following day. Around 18:00 UTC on September 3, the hurricane peaked with winds of 155 mph (250 km/h), observed by a ship. Simultaneously, the storm made landfall near Santo Domingo, Dominican Republic.

The mountainous terrain of Hispaniola rapidly weakened the system to a tropical storm early on September 4. Moving westward over the Caribbean Sea, the storm failed to re-strengthen before making landfall in western Cuba with winds of 40 mph (65 km/h) around midday on September 6. Thereafter, the system entered the Gulf of Mexico and curved northeastward. At 09:00 UTC on September 9, the storm again made landfall near Bradenton, Florida, with winds of 45 mph (75 km/h). Later that day, the storm weakened to a tropical depression while crossing Florida. Upon emerging into the Atlantic Ocean on the next day, the system re-intensified into a tropical storm. While located offshore South Carolina, the storm re-attained hurricane status early on September 12. The hurricane then brushed the Outer Banks of North Carolina before heading out to sea. The storm further strengthened to Category 2 intensity while heading eastward, but later weakened to a tropical storm early on September 16. The following day, the storm deteriorated further to a tropical depression, and late on September 17, the cyclone dissipated southwest of the Azores.

While crossing the Lesser Antilles, the hurricane brought powerful winds and heavy rainfall to the islands. On Dominica, crops suffered severe damage. All vessels at the harbor sank, killing two people. The hurricane destroyed approximately 1,000 homes and severely damaged roughly 850 others. Guadeloupe and Martinique both reported extensive crop losses. Winds on Puerto Rico left mostly minor damage to plantations, and rainfall was generally "beneficial". In the Dominican Republic, three districts of Santo Domingo were destroyed, with half of the city leveled by the hurricane. Damages in the city were an estimated $50 million (1930 USD). The Red Cross estimated 2,000 people perished in the city, with an additional 8,000 injured. Historians estimate the hurricane left between 2,000 and 8,000 fatalities. Haiti experienced crop damage due to the storm. In Florida, "damaging" rainfall was observed over southeastern Hillsborough County, with 8 to 9 in (200 to 230 mm) measured. Press reports indicated damage to highways and bridges, and crops were inundated. Damage reached approximately $75,000. After passing the Outer Banks of North Carolina as re-intensifying hurricane, power outages occurred across the region. Buildings at Cape Lookout were severely damaged.

=== Tropical Storm Three ===
- Tropical storm (SSHWS)
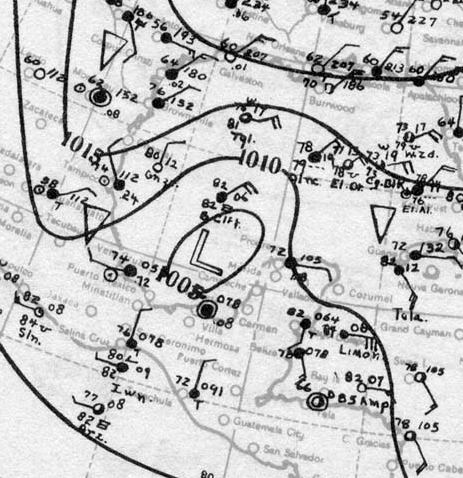
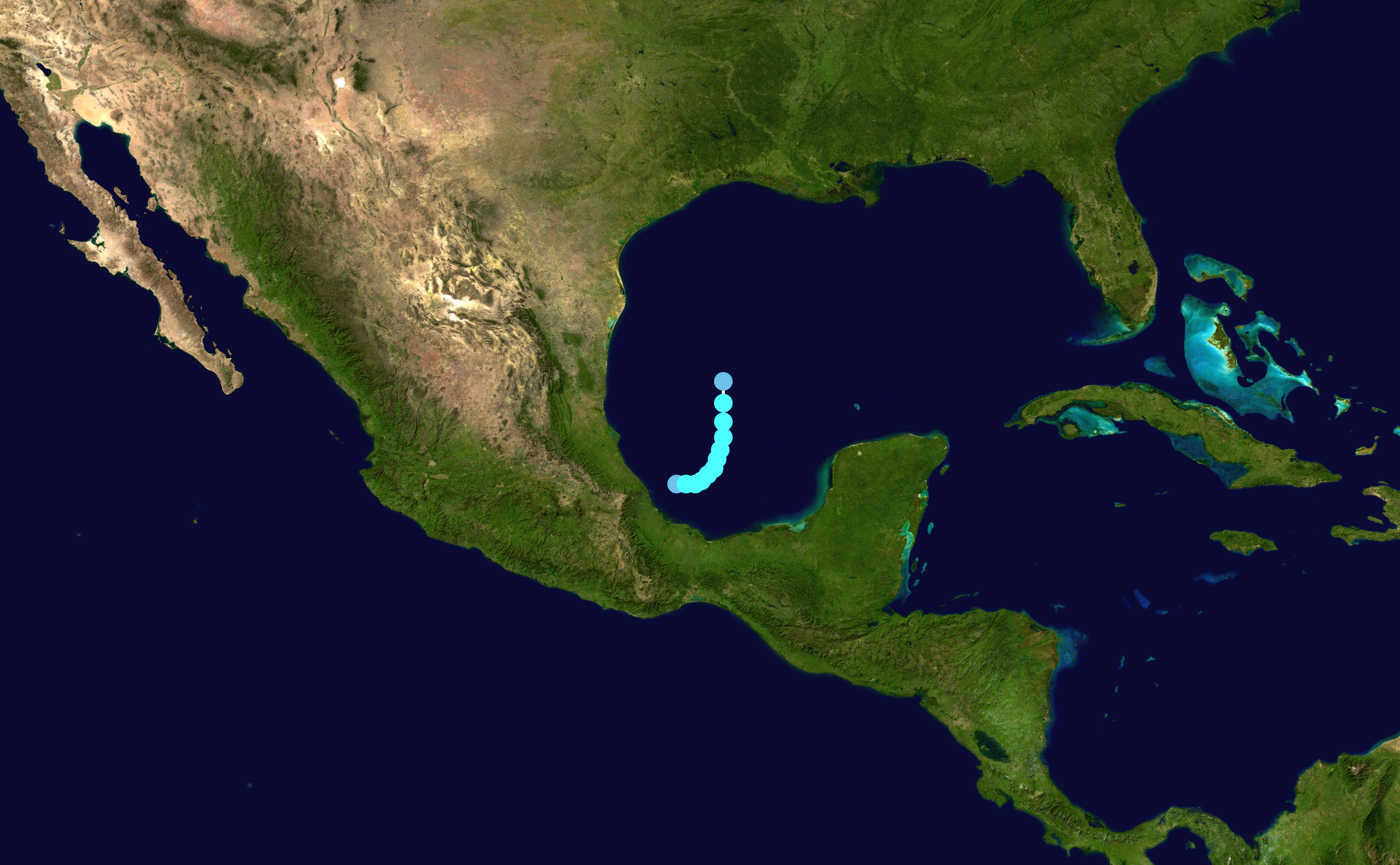
- Duration: October 18 – October 21
- Peak intensity: 70 mph (110 km/h) (1-min); 992 mbar (hPa)

The final storm of the season developed in the Bay of Campeche on October 18 at the tail end of a frontal boundary. Although cool-air advection was occurring off the United States coast, warm air around the system allowed the tropical storm to intensify. Moving to the northeast, the system reached peak intensity as a high-end tropical storm with winds of 70 mph (110 km/h). Ultimately, the cool-air advection eventually took a toll on the storm, causing it to quickly weaken. By 06:00 UTC on October 21, the storm dissipated.

== See also ==
- 1900–1950 South-West Indian Ocean cyclone seasons
- 1930s Australian region cyclone seasons
