= Deli, Chaharmahal and Bakhtiari =

Village in Chaharmahal and Bakhtiari province, Iran

Deli Persian: دلي
- Village
- Location within Iran
- Coordinates: 31°17′41″N 50°57′23″E
- Country: Iran
- Province: Chaharmahal and Bakhtiari
- County: Lordegan
- District: Rudasht
- Rural District: Sardasht

Population (2016)
  - Total: 598
- Time zone: UTC+3:30 (IRST)

Deli (Persian: دلي) (Note: Also romanized as Delī) is a village in Sardasht Rural District of Rudasht District (Note: Formerly Talayeh District) in Lordegan County, Chaharmahal and Bakhtiari province, Iran.

== Demographics ==
=== Ethnicity ===
The village is populated by Lurs.

=== Population ===
At the time of the 2006 National Census, the village's population was 460 in 90 households, when it was in the Central District. The following census in 2011 counted 574 people in 122 households. The 2016 census measured the population of the village as 598 people in 133 households, by which time the rural district had been separated from the district in the formation of Talayeh District. (Note: Renamed Rudasht District)
