= New Delhi (disambiguation) =

New Delhi is the capital city of India.

New Delhi may also refer to:

- New Delhi district, a district of NCT Delhi
- New Delhi metro station, a metro station in the city
- New Delhi Assembly constituency, an electoral constituency of the Delhi Legislative Assembly
- New Delhi Lok Sabha constituency, an electoral constituency of the Indian parliament
- New Delhi (1956 film), a Hindi film
- New Delhi (1987 film), a Malayalam film
- New Delhi (1988 Hindi film), a Hindi film
- New Delhi (1988 Kannada film), a Kannada film
- New Delhi, Illinois, an unincorporated community in the United States
- New Delhi, a metonym for the Government of India

== See also ==
- Delhi (disambiguation)
- New Delhi Municipal Council
