= 1930 Pacific hurricane season =

Seasonal boundaries
- First system formed: June 4, 1930
- Last system dissipated: October 20, 1930

Strongest storm
- Name: Three
  - Lowest pressure: 939 mbar (hPa; 27.73 inHg)

Seasonal statistics
- Total storms: 5
- Hurricanes: 4
- Total fatalities: Unknown
- Total damage: > $10,000 (1930 USD)

Related articles
- 1930 Atlantic hurricane season; 1930 Pacific typhoon season; 1930s North Indian Ocean cyclone seasons

The 1930 Pacific hurricane season ran through the summer and fall of 1930. Before the satellite age started in the 1960s, data on east Pacific hurricanes was extremely unreliable. Most east Pacific storms were of no threat to land.

== Systems ==
=== Hurricane One ===
On June 4, a tropical cyclone formed south of the Gulf of Tehuantepec. It paralleled the coast, became a hurricane, and approached the coast. On June 11, it made landfall north of Mazatlán and dissipated inland. Some damage in Mazatlán was reported.

=== Tropical Cyclone Two ===
From August 18 to 20, a tropical cyclone existed in the waters west of Manzanillo. A ship reported a pressure of 29.63 inHg (100.3 kPa).

=== Hurricane Three ===
On October 3, a tropical cyclone formed near the Revillagigedo Islands. It slowly moved northeasterly, became very intense, and made landfall north of Mazatlán on October 4 or October 5. Once inland, it greatly increased in speed, and dissipated October 7, while over Arkansas. A ship in the eye of the hurricane reported a pressure of 27.72 inHg (93.9 kPa), low enough to make this the most intense Pacific hurricane in Mexican waters known at the time.

This hurricane hassled a number of ships. One of them needed to be repaired at a cost of $10,000 (1930 USD), and another had its cargo damaged.

=== Hurricane Four ===
On October 9, a tropical cyclone formed in the Gulf of Tehuantepec. Eventually becoming a hurricane, it moved up the coast as far as Acapulco. It was last seen on October 11. The lowest pressure reported was 29 inHg (98 kPa).

This hurricane caused damage in Acapulco. Many buildings were demolished by the storm, and roads and telegraph lines were destroyed. Damage to property was heavy, but no one was killed or injured.

=== Hurricane Five ===
On October 16, a tropical cyclone existed somewhere between Acapulco and Cape Corrientes. Two days later, it made landfall near La Manzanilla, Jalisco as a hurricane near with a pressure of 98.3 kilopascals (29.0 inHg). It or its remnants managed to cross the Isthmus of Tehuantepec and enter the Bay of Campeche, where they dissipated on October 20.

== See also ==
- 1930 Atlantic hurricane season
- 1930 Pacific typhoon season
- 1930s North Indian Ocean cyclone seasons
- 1900–1940 South Pacific cyclone seasons
- 1900–1950 South-West Indian Ocean cyclone seasons
- 1930s Australian region cyclone seasons
