= Kal Geh-ye Sardasht =

Village in Chaharmahal and Bakhtiari province, Iran

Kal Geh-ye Sardasht Persian: كلگه سردشت
- Village
- Location within Iran
- Coordinates: 31°23′44″N 50°50′10″E
- Country: Iran
- Province: Chaharmahal and Bakhtiari
- County: Lordegan
- District: Rudasht
- Rural District: Sardasht

Population (2016)
  - Total: 614
- Time zone: UTC+3:30 (IRST)

Kal Geh-ye Sardasht (Persian: كلگه سردشت) (Note: Also known as Kal Gah and Kal Geh) is a village in Sardasht Rural District of Rudasht District (Note: Formerly Talayeh District) in Lordegan County, Chaharmahal and Bakhtiari province, Iran.

== Demographics ==
=== Population ===
At the time of the 2006 National Census, the village's population was 453 in 87 households, when it was in the Central District. The following census in 2011 counted 470 people in 105 households. The 2016 census measured the population of the village as 614 people in 118 households, by which time the rural district had been separated from the district in the formation of Talayeh District. (Note: Renamed Rudasht District)
