= HMS Danae =

Seven ships of the Royal Navy have borne the name HMS Danae, after the Greek heroine Danaë.

- HMS Danae (1759) was a 38-gun fifth rate captured from the French in 1759 by HMS Southampton and HMS Melampe. She was broken up by 1771.
- HMS Danae (1779) was a 32-gun fifth rate captured from the French in 1779. She was sold in 1797.
- HMS Danae (1798) was a 20-gun sixth-rate post ship, formerly the French frigate, Vaillante. She was captured by HMS Indefatigable in 1798 off the Île de Ré. In March 1800 members of her crew mutinied, took control and handed her over to the French.
- HMS Danae (1867) was an Eclipse-class wooden screw corvette launched in 1867. She was lent to the War Department in 1886 as a hulk and was sold in 1906.
- HMS Danae (D44) was a Danae-class light cruiser launched in 1918. She was lent to the Polish Navy between 1944 and 1946 as ORP Conrad and was sold for scrapping in 1948.
- HMS Danae was to have been a Battle-class destroyer named HMS Vimiera. She was later reordered as a Daring-class destroyer, but was cancelled in 1946.
- HMS Danae (F47) was a Leander-class frigate launched in 1965. She was sold to Ecuador in 1991 and renamed Moran Valverde.
