= Sardasht, Lordegan =

City in Chaharmahal and Bakhtiari province, Iran

Sardasht Persian: سردشت
- City
- Location within Iran
- Coordinates: 31°23′01″N 50°50′35″E
- Country: Iran
- Province: Chaharmahal and Bakhtiari
- County: Lordegan
- District: Rudasht
- Established as a city: 2013

Population (2016)
  - Total: 5,691
- Time zone: UTC+3:30 (IRST)

Sardasht (Persian: سردشت is a city in, and the capital of, Rudasht District (Note: Formerly Talayeh District) in Lordegan County, Chaharmahal and Bakhtiari province, Iran. It also serves as the administrative center for Sardasht Rural District.

== History ==
In 2011, the villages of Abza-ye Sardasht, Bar Aftab-e Sardasht, Mazeh-ye Sardasht, and Sakht-e Sardasht in Sardasht Rural District of the Central District were merged to form the village of Sardasht, which was converted to a city in 2013.

== Demographics ==
=== Population ===
At the time of the 2016 National Census, the city's population was 5,691 people in 1,184 households, by which time the rural district had been separated from the district in the formation of Talayeh District. (Note: Renamed Rudasht District)
