= Dilly (crater) =

Crater on Mars

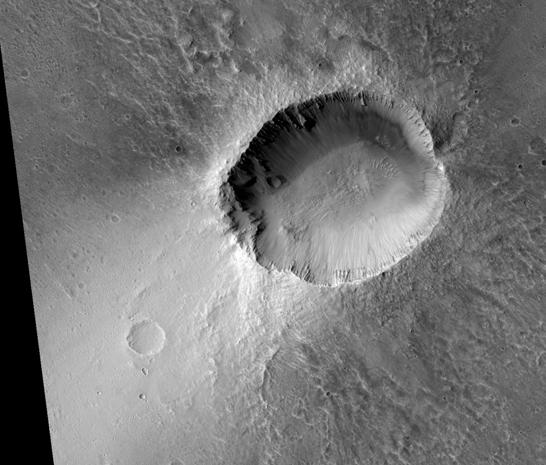
- Dilly Crater, as seen by HiRISE.
- Planet: Mars
- Coordinates: 13.24°N 202.9°W
- Quadrangle: Elysium
- Diameter: 1.3 km
- Eponym: town in Mali

Dilly is a crater in the Elysium quadrangle of Mars, located at 13.24° North and 202.9° West. It is only 1.3 km in diameter and was named after Dilly, a town in Mali.

Impact craters generally have a rim with ejecta around them, in contrast volcanic craters usually do not have a rim or ejecta deposits. As craters get larger (greater than 10 km in diameter) they usually have a central peak. The peak is caused by a rebound of the crater floor following the impact.

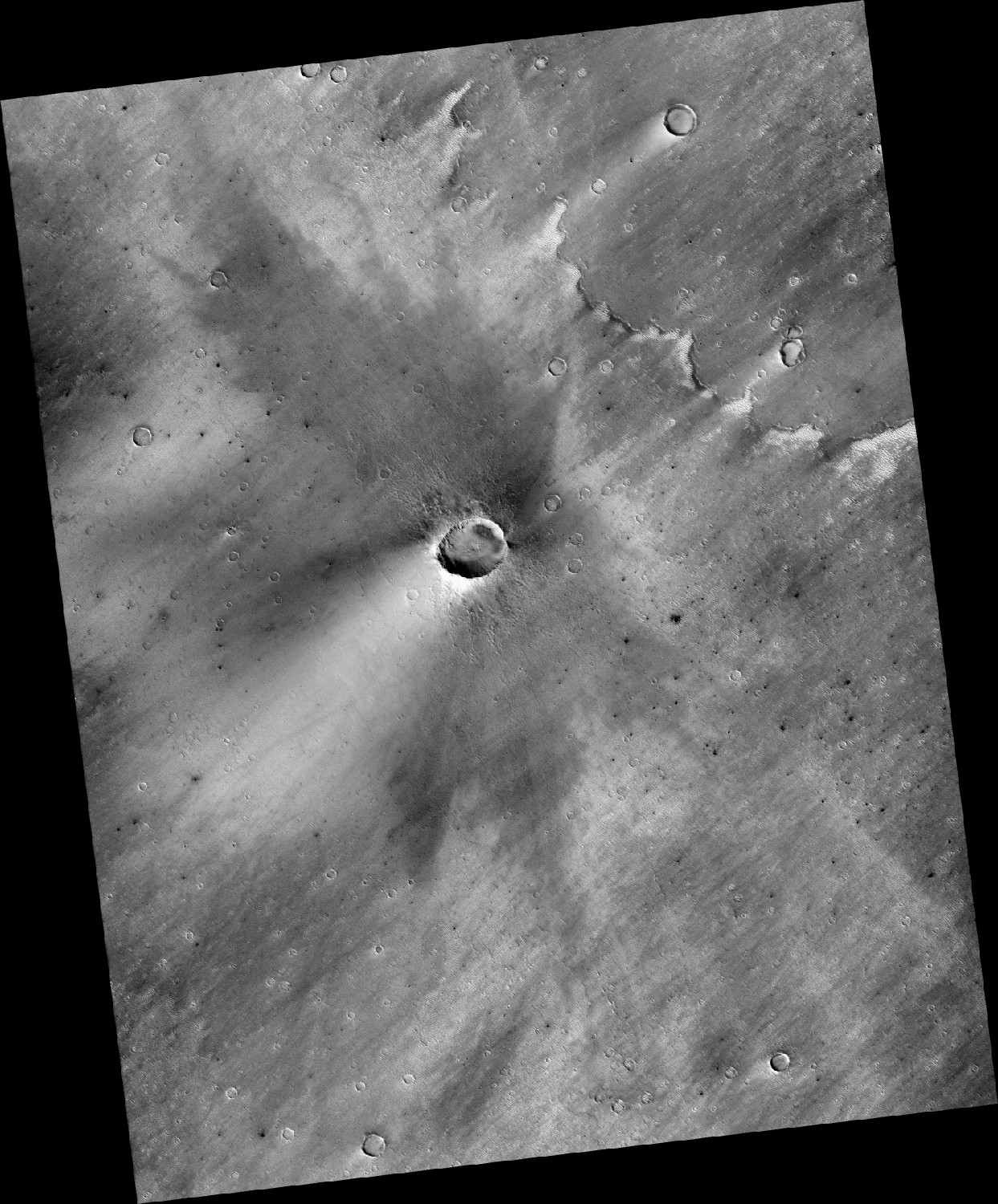
Dilly crater and vicinity, as seen by CTX camera on MRO

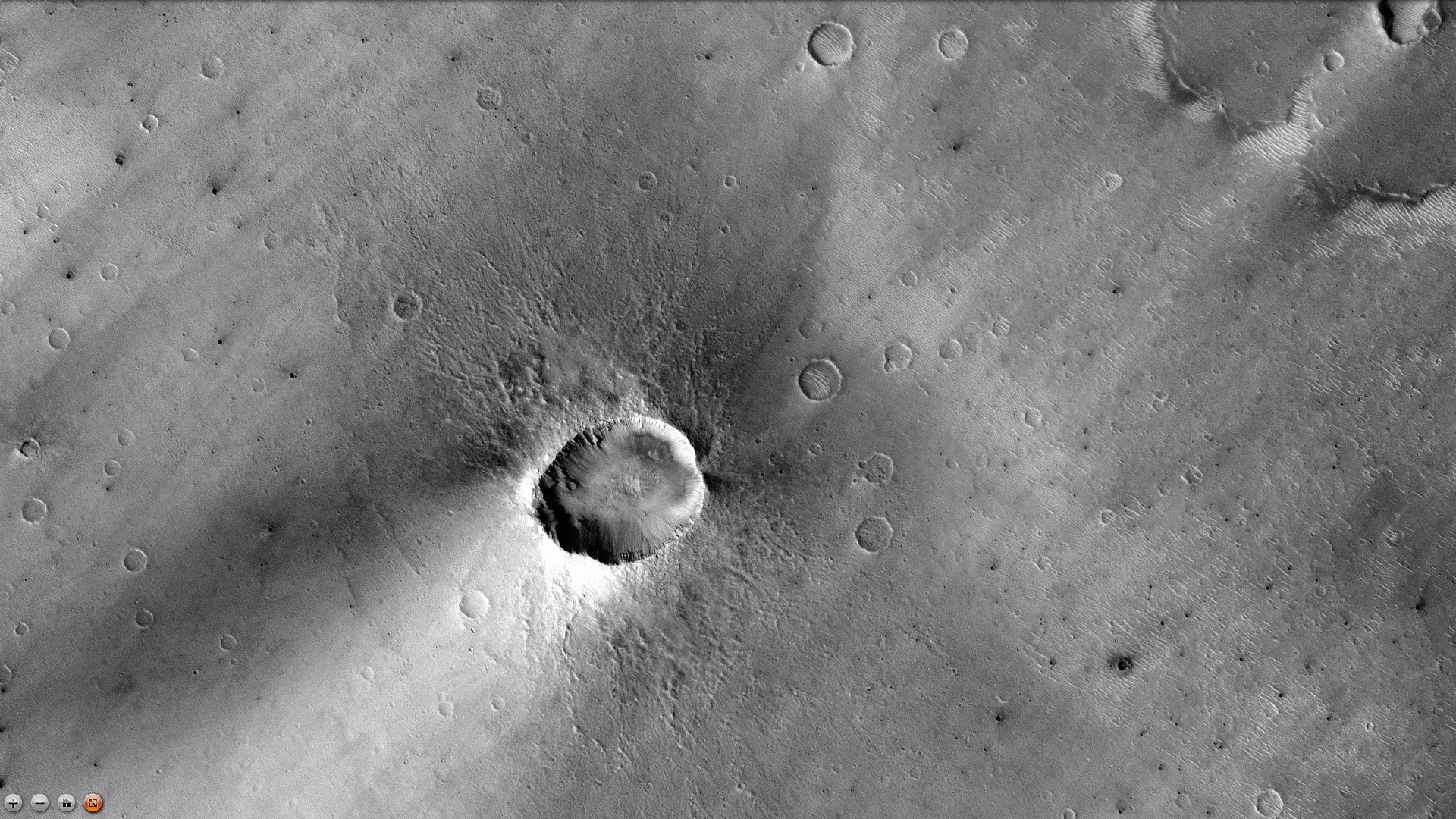
Enlargement of the previous image

== See also ==
- Impact crater
- Impact event
- List of craters on Mars
- Ore resources on Mars
- Planetary nomenclature
