= German submarine U-110 =

U-110 may refer to one of the following German submarines:

- SM U-110, a Type U 93 submarine launched in 1917 and that served in World War I until sunk on 15 March 1918
  - During World War I, Germany also had this submarine with a similar name:
    - SM UB-110, a Type UB III submarine launched in 1917 and sunk on 19 July 1918
- German submarine U-110 (1940), a Type IXB submarine that served in World War II until captured on 9 May 1941; allowed to sink on 10 May 1941 after Allied capture of codes and secret documents
