= Eclipse-class sloop =

1867 class of British screw sloops

- HMS Sirius

Class overview
- Name: Eclipse class
- Builders: Devonport Dockyard; Portsmouth Dockyard; Chatham Dockyard; Sheerness Dockyard; Deptford Dockyard
- Operators: Royal Navy
- Preceded by: Amazon class
- Succeeded by: Fantome class
- Built: 1867–1870
- In service: 1867–1921
- Completed: 7
- Scrapped: 7

General characteristics (as built)
- Type: Wooden screw sloop (later corvette)
- Displacement: 1,760 long tons (1,790 t)
- Tons burthen: 1,268 bm
- Length: 212 ft (64.6 m) (p/p)
- Beam: 36 ft (11.0 m)
- Draught: 16 ft 6 in (5.0 m)
- Depth: 21 ft 6 in (6.6 m)
- Installed power: 1,946–2,518 ihp (1,451–1,878 kW)
- Propulsion: 1 shaft; 1 × 2-cylinder horizontal steam engine; 4 or 6 × boilers
- Sail plan: Barque or Ship rig
- Speed: 12–13 knots (22–24 km/h; 14–15 mph)
- Complement: 180
- Armament: 2 × 7-inch rifled muzzle-loading guns; 4 × 6.3-inch 64-pounder rifled muzzle-loading guns

The Eclipse class was a class of seven 6-gun wooden screw sloops built for the Royal Navy between 1867 and 1870. They were re-armed and re-classified as 12-gun corvettes in 1876. Two further vessels were proposed but never ordered.

== Design ==
A development of the Amazon class, they were designed by Edward Reed, the Royal Navy's Director of Naval Construction. The hull was of wooden construction, but with iron cross-beams, and a ram bow was fitted.

=== Propulsion ===
Propulsion was provided by a two-cylinder horizontal steam engine driving a single screw. Spartan, Sirius and Tenedos had compound steam engines, and the remainder of the class had single-expansion steam engines.

=== Sail plan ===
All the ships of the class were built with a ship rig, but this was replaced with a barque rig.

=== Armament ===
The Eclipse class was designed with two 7-inch (6½-ton) muzzle-loading rifled guns mounted in traversing slides and four 64-pounder muzzle-loading rifled guns. They were re-classified as corvettes in 1876, carrying a homogenous armament of twelve 64-pounder muzzle-loading rifled guns.

== Ships ==
Name	Ship Builder	Launched	Fate
Danae	Portsmouth Dockyard	21 May 1867	Lent to the War Department as a hulk in 1886 and sold on 15 May 1906
Blanche	Chatham Dockyard	17 August 1867	Sold to Castle for breaking in September 1886
Eclipse	Sheerness Dockyard	14 November 1867	Lent to the War Department for use as a storage hulk between 1888 and 1892. Anchored in the Hamoaze as a floating magazine and No. 3 (Devonport) Division, Metropolitan Police barracks on census night in 1911. Sold in 1921.
Sirius	Portsmouth Dockyard	24 April 1868	Sold to Castle for breaking at Charlton in 1885
Spartan	Deptford Dockyard	14 November 1868	Sold to Castle for breaking on 7 November 1882
Dido	Portsmouth Dockyard	23 October 1869	Hulked in 1886. Renamed Actaeon II in 1906. Sold to J B Garnham for breaking on 17 July 1922
Tenedos	Devonport Dockyard	13 May 1870	Sold to G Pethwick of Plymouth for breaking in November 1887
Proserpine	-	-	Authorised on 18 December 1866 but never ordered
Diomede	-	-	Authorised on 18 December 1866 but rescinded on 30 April 1867

== Bibliography ==
- Ballard, G. A. (1938). "British Sloops of 1875: The Smaller Ram-Bowed Type". Mariner's Mirror. 24 (April). Cambridge, UK: Society for Nautical Research: 160–75.
- Chesneau, Roger; Kolesnik, Eugene M., eds. (1979). Conway's All the World's Fighting Ships 1860–1905. Greenwich, UK: Conway Maritime Press. ISBN 0-8317-0302-4.
- Lyon, David & Winfield, Rif (2004). The Sail and Steam Navy List: All the Ships of the Royal Navy 1815–1889. Chatham Publishing. ISBN 978-1-86176-032-6. OCLC 52620555.
