= Gal Gah =

Gal Gah گل گاه
- Village
- Location within Iran
- Coordinates: 30°10′08″N 51°41′07″E
- Country: Iran
- Province: Fars
- County: Mamasani
- Bakhsh: Central
- Rural District: Javid-e Mahuri

Population (2006)
  - Total: 123
- Time zone: UTC+3:30 (IRST)
  - Summer (DST): UTC+4:30 (IRDT)

Gal Gah (Persian: گل گاه, also Romanized as Gal Gāh; also known as Kal Gāh) is a village in Javid-e Mahuri Rural District, in the Central District of Mamasani County, Fars province, Iran. At the 2006 census, its population was 123, in 25 families.
