= Darreh Kalgah-e Pereshkaft =

Darreh Kalgah-e Pereshkaft دره كلگه پراشكفت
- Village
- Location within Iran
- Coordinates: 30°42′24″N 51°17′32″E
- Country: Iran
- Province: Kohgiluyeh and Boyer-Ahmad
- County: Boyer-Ahmad
- Bakhsh: Central
- Rural District: Dasht-e Rum

Population (2006)
  - Total: 52
- Time zone: UTC+3:30 (IRST)
  - Summer (DST): UTC+4:30 (IRDT)

Darreh Kalgah-e Pereshkaft (Persian: دره كلگه پراشكفت; also known as Darreh Kalgah and Kal Gah) is a village in Dasht-e Rum Rural District, in the Central District of Boyer-Ahmad County, Kohgiluyeh and Boyer-Ahmad Province, Iran. According to the 2006 census, its population was 52, in 14 families.
