= Deli Zal Beyg =

Deli Zal Beyg دلي زالبگ
- Village
- Location within Iran
- Coordinates: 33°31′39″N 48°27′43″E
- Country: Iran
- Province: Lorestan
- County: Khorramabad
- Bakhsh: Central
- Rural District: Dehpir-e Shomali

Population (2006)
  - Total: 91
- Time zone: UTC+3:30 (IRST)
  - Summer (DST): UTC+4:30 (IRDT)

Deli Zal Beyg (Persian: دلي زالبگ, also Romanized as Delī Z̄āl Beyg, Dālī Zāl Beyg, Dālī Zāl Bag, Dālī Zālbak, Dālīzālbek, and Delī Zālbak; also known as Delī Zāl va Bek, Delī, and Delī Zāl ow Bek) is a village in Dehpir-e Shomali Rural District, in the Central District of Khorramabad County, Lorestan Province, Iran. At the 2006 census, its population was 91, in 18 families.
