= Delhi, Georgia =

Unincorporated community in Georgia, U.S.

Coordinates: 33°54′49″N 82°40′26″W

Delhi is an unincorporated community in Wilkes County, in the U.S. state of Georgia.

== History ==
A post office called Delhi was established in 1858. The community was named after Delhi, in India. A variant name was "Pistol".
