= Dili (disambiguation) =

Dili is the capital of Timor-Leste.

Dili may also refer to:

- Dili Municipality, a municipality of Timor-Leste
- Roman Catholic Diocese of Díli
- Dara, a game played in Niger and Nigeria
- Dili, alternative name for the Tiele people

DILI is an initialism for drug-induced liver injury

== See also ==
- Dilli (disambiguation)
