= HMS Danae (1867) =

Sloop of the Royal Navy

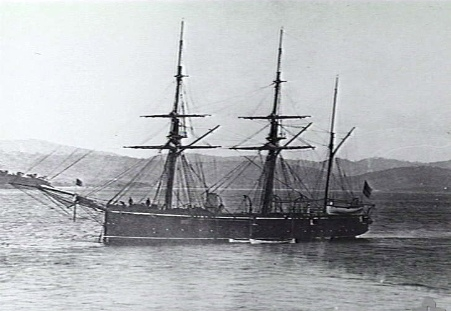
- HMS Danae c.1880.

History

United Kingdom
- Name: HMS Danae
- Namesake: Danaë
- Builder: Portsmouth Dockyard
- Laid down: 1865
- Launched: 21 May 1867
- Completed: November 1867
- Decommissioned: Lent to the War Dept as a hulk, 1886
- Fate: Sold for scrap, 15 May 1906

General characteristics (as built)
- Class & type: Eclipse-class wooden screw sloop (later corvette)
- Displacement: 1,760 long tons (1,790 t)
- Tons burthen: 1,268 bm
- Length: 212 ft (64.6 m) (p/p)
- Beam: 36 ft (11.0 m)
- Draught: 16 ft 6 in (5.0 m)
- Depth: 21 ft 6 in (6.6 m)
- Installed power: 2,089 ihp (1,558 kW)
- Propulsion: 1 shaft; 1 × 2-cylinder horizontal return connecting rod-steam engine; 4 × rectangular boilers
- Sail plan: Barque rig
- Speed: 12 knots (22 km/h; 14 mph)
- Complement: 180
- Armament: 2 × 7-inch rifled muzzle-loading guns; 4 × 6.3-inch 64-pounder rifled muzzle-loading guns

HMS Danae was an Eclipse-class sloop (Note: The class were re-rated as corvettes in 1876) of the Royal Navy, built at the Portsmouth Dockyard and launched on 21 May 1867.

During 1867, she commissioned on the Cape and West Africa Station and served until being transferred to the North America and West Indies Station in 1869. Danae was refitted and rearmed in 1874 in England. After refit she commissioned for the East Indies Station, then later the Cape Station and finally she commenced service on the Australia Station in September 1878. She left the Australia Station in August 1880 and returned to England.

After returning home in 1881, she was declared unfit due to rotten upper planking and was paid off. She was converted into a mine hulk in 1886, before being lent to the War Department in 1891. Danae was stationed on the River Mersey until 1905.

== Fate ==
She was sold on 15 May 1906 for breaking up.

== Bibliography ==
- Ballard, G. A. (1938). "British Sloops of 1875: The Smaller Ram-Bowed Type". Mariner's Mirror. 24 (April). Cambridge, UK: Society for Nautical Research: 160–75.
- Bastock, John (1988), Ships on the Australia Station, Child & Associates Publishing; Frenchs Forest, Australia. ISBN 0-86777-348-0
- Chesneau, Roger; Kolesnik, Eugene M., eds. (1979). Conway's All the World's Fighting Ships 1860-1905. Greenwich, UK: Conway Maritime Press. ISBN 0-8317-0302-4.
- Lyon, David & Winfield, Rif (2004). The Sail and Steam Navy List: All the Ships of the Royal Navy 1815–1889. Chatham Publishing. ISBN 978-1-86176-032-6. OCLC 52620555.
