= Dilli =

Dilli may refer to:

- Dillī or Delhi, the National Capital Territory of India
  - Naī Dillī or New Delhi, a municipality within the National Capital Territory
- Dilli (film), a 2011 Indian short documentary film
- Dilli, Kemaliye, village in Erzincan Province of Turkey
- Dilli Village, Fraser Island, Queensland

== See also ==
- Dili (disambiguation)
  - Dili, the capital and largest city of East Timor
- Delhi (disambiguation)
