= Capture of Delhi (1760) =

Major battle between Durrani and Maratha forces

Siege of Delhi (1760)
- Part of Afghan-Maratha and Jat War
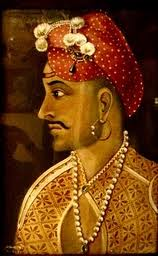
Date	23 July 1760
Location	Delhi
Result	Maratha and Jat victory
Territorial changes	Delhi Captured by Sadashivrao Bhau

Belligerents
Maratha Empire; Bharatpur State	Durrani Empire

Commanders and leaders
Sadashivrao Bhau; Malhar Rao Holkar; Jankoji Rao Scindia; Suraj Mal	Yakub Ali Khan (surrendered)

Strength
70,000 combatants 300,000 including camp followers (non-combatants	Unknown

The Capture of Delhi, fought in 1760, pitted the forces of the Maratha Empire against those of the Durrani Empire led by Yakub Ali Khan. The Maratha army was commanded by Sadashivrao Bhau, a prominent military leader and cousin of the Maratha Peshwa Balaji Baji Rao. The Durrani army, on the other hand, was led by Yakub Ali Khan, a trusted general of Ahmad Shah Durrani, the founder of the Durrani Empire.

== Siege ==
Sadashivrao Bhau, accompanied by his allies, arrived in Agra on 14 July but was forced to abandon his plan of negotiating with Govind Ballal due to the high floods of the Jamuna river. Instead, he decided to move northward and avoid waiting for three months until the water receded. Bhau's advance guard, led by Malharrao, Jankoji, and Balwantrao Mehendele, attacked Delhi on 22 July. The city fell, but the fort remained under Afghan control. One hundred Maratha soldiers entered the fort undetected and began plundering the royal apartments. However, some were killed by Afghan guards, and others jumped down from the walls and broke their limbs. The fort was besieged and bombarded, and on 27 July, Sadashivrao Bhau arrived in Delhi on 29 July and negotiated peace terms with Yaqub Ali Khan, allowing him to depart safely with his family, property, and troops. Naro Shankar was appointed as the new subahdar of Delhi, and Baloji Palande was put in charge of the fort under Naro Shankar's authority.
