= HMS Delhi =

Three ships of the Royal Navy have borne the name HMS Delhi, after the Indian city of Delhi:

- HMS Delhi was the name under which the battleship HMS Emperor of India was constructed, but she was renamed a month prior to her launch in November 1913.
- HMS Delhi (D47) was a Danae-class light cruiser launched in 1918. She served in the Second World War and was scrapped in 1948.
- HMIS Delhi (1948) was formerly the Leander-class cruiser HMNZS Achilles, transferred to the Royal Indian Navy in 1948, and recommissioned as INS Delhi (C74) when India became a republic in 1950. She was broken up in 1978.
