= Sardasht Rural District (Lordegan County) =

Rural district in Chaharmahal and Bakhtiari province, Iran

Sardasht Rural District Persian: دهستان سردشت
- Rural District
- Location within Iran
- Coordinates: 31°19′N 50°55′E
- Country: Iran
- Province: Chaharmahal and Bakhtiari
- County: Lordegan
- District: Rudasht
- Established: 1987
- Capital: Sardasht

Population (2016)
  - Total: 9,211
- Time zone: UTC+3:30 (IRST)

Sardasht Rural District (Persian: دهستان سردشت) is in Rudasht District (Note: Formerly Talayeh District) of Lordegan County, Chaharmahal and Bakhtiari province, Iran. It is administered from the city of Sardasht.

== Demographics ==
=== Population ===
At the time of the 2006 National Census, the rural district's population (as a part of the Central District) was 13,006 in 2,343 households. There were 14,848 inhabitants in 2,963 households at the following census of 2011. The 2016 census measured the population of the rural district as 9,211 in 2,085 households, by which time the rural district had been separated from the district in the formation of Talayeh District. (Note: Renamed Rudasht District) The most populous of its 30 villages was Shahrak-e Mamur, with 2,861 people.

=== Other villages in the rural district ===
- Abzir
- Deli
- Emamabad
- Kal Geh-ye Sardasht
- Talayeh
