= Rudasht District (Lordegan County) =

District in Chaharmahal and Bakhtiari province, Iran

Rudasht District Persian: بخش رودشت
- District
- Location within Iran
- Coordinates: 31°19′N 50°52′E
- Country: Iran
- Province: Chaharmahal and Bakhtiari
- County: Lordegan
- Established: 2011
- Capital: Sardasht

Population (2016)
  - Total: 16,762
- Time zone: UTC+3:30 (IRST)

Rudasht District (Persian: بخش رودشت) (Note: Formerly Talayeh District) is in Lordegan County, Chaharmahal and Bakhtiari province, Iran. Its capital is the city of Sardasht.

== History ==
In 2011, Sardasht Rural District was separated from the Central District in the formation of Talayeh District. (Note: Renamed Rudasht District) In addition, four villages merged in forming the village of Sardasht, which was converted to a city in 2013.

== Demographics ==
=== Population ===
At the time of the 2016 National Census, the district's population was 16,762 inhabitants living in 3,678 households.

=== Administrative divisions ===
Rudasht District Population
Administrative Divisions	2016
Dudera RD	1,860
Sardasht RD	9,211
Sardasht (city)	5,691
Total	16,762
RD = Rural District
