= Baka Bai =

Maratha stateswoman (1774-1858)

- Born: c. 1774
- Died: 1858 (aged eighty-four); Nagpur
- Spouse: Raghoji II Bhonsle
- House: Bhonsle (by marriage)
- Religion: Hinduism

Baka Bai (c. 1774-1858) was a Maratha stateswoman and favourite wife of Raghoji II Bhonsle, the king of Nagpur. After her husband's death, she played a key role in the intrigues at the royal court of Nagpur.

== Life ==
=== Nagpur politics ===
Baka Bai was the fourth and favourite wife of Raghoji II Bhonsle, the Maratha monarch of Nagpur Kingdom. She was present at the Battle of Argaon in 1803, in which the Marathas were defeated. After her husband's death on 22 March 1816, Baka Bai brought her step-son Parsoji II Bhonsle to the royal palace, who succeeded to the throne of the kingdom.

Parsoji II was blind, lame and paralysed, thus soon after his accession he became totally deranged, and it became necessary to appoint a Regent. Baka Bai was selected to manage the Raja's person and the kingdom. She became very influential, owning Makardhokra, Amgaon, Dighori, and other villages. She held the status of dowager queen and formed a strong faction at the Nagpur royal court, including Dharmaji Bhonsle, Naroba Chitnis and Gujabdada-Gujar. However, the talented Appa Sahib assassinated Dharmaji Bhonsle, persuaded several members of Bakabai's faction to support him in his endeavour of becoming regent, and acquired the regency.

By January 1817, Appa Sahib established his authority in court and poisoned Parsoji II to eliminate any obstacles in his path to the throne. Appa Sahib immediately ascended the throne before any opposition by Baka Bai's faction.

Appa Sahib was defeated at the Battle of Sitabuldi by the British and a treaty was signed on 9 January 1818, reducing Nagpur to tributary status. However, shortly after the treaty was concluded he renewed resistance, raising the local Gonds in rebellion, who burnt Makardhokra, Amgaon, Dighori, and other villages belonging to Baka Bai.

Appa Sahib was arrested and deposed, and sent to Allahabad under a strong escort. Meanwhile, Baka Bai and the other widows of Raghoji II Bhonsle were persudaded by the British Resident minister, Richard Jenkins, to adopt Bajiba, a maternal grandson of Raghoji II Bhonsle. Bajiba was crowned as Raghuji III Bhonsle. Baka Bai was at the head of the regency for the raja's minority, but only had charge of the palace affairs and the young king. The administration was carried out by Richard Jenkins, the British Resident minister at Nagpur.

When Raghuji III died in 1853 without a male heir, the Kingdom of Nagpur was about to be annexed by the Doctrine of Lapse policy devised by Lord Dalhousie. Baka Bai tried all peaceful measures to resist the unjust policy, but eventually agreed to receive a pension along with the other Bhonsle family members. She received the largest share of the pension, Rs. 1,20,000. However, despite her protests, the Nagpur treasury was thoroughly looted by the British after the annexation of the kingdom.

=== Revolt of 1857 ===
During the Revolt of 1857 there was unrest in Nagpur and the whole of the Central Provinces, but due to Baka Bai using all her power and influence to help the British government, a large uprising was prevented. This greatly pleased the British government, because as a leading Maratha kingdom which had been recently annexed, its defection to the rebel cause would have served as an important centre of revolt to the Maratha region and to the north of the Nizam's dominions.

== Death ==
Baka Bai died sometime in September 1858, aged eighty-four. She was remembered for her piousness, especially in the Hindu community of the Central Provinces.

== Legacy ==
Baka Bai is often represented as a traitor, who supported the colonial British Government despite her kingdom being annexed by them. However, this is not completely true, as she was considered hostile to the British government. But she soon realized that the British were going to be the paramount rulers of the Indian subcontinent. She only tried to resist the British annexation of the kingdom by peaceful means, since she wanted to secure titles and privilges for her descendants. She succeeded in creating a new title for her adopted descendants- "Raja Bahadur of Deur".

Light on her character has also been shed in the book "Nagpur ke Bhonsle" (Bhonsles of Nagpur).

V.D. Savarkar in his book 1857 The Indian War of Independence (book) quotes her treachery, "While the Lightning was working destruction at Jhansi, Banka, seeing that her sons were ready to unsheath their swords of Swaraj, threatened them that, if they did unsheath their swords, she would herself inform the Feringhis of their designs and advise the Feringhis to behead them !"
