= Third Anglo-Maratha War =

War between British East India Company and the Marathas

- Part of the Anglo-Maratha Wars
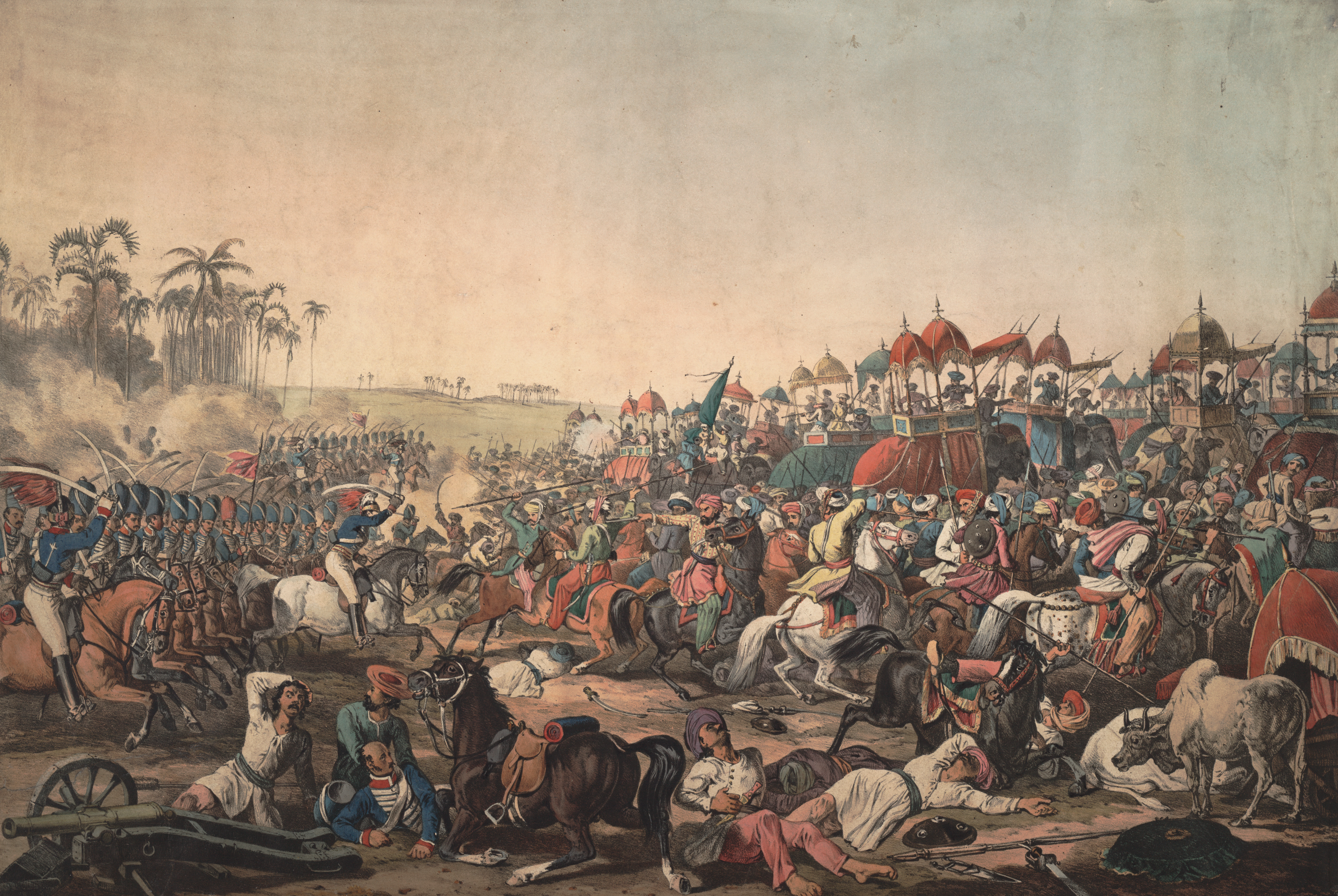
- The Battle of Nagpore by Robert Woolf c.1817
Date	5 November 1817 – 9 April 1819
Location	The modern state of Maharashtra and neighbouring areas
Result	British victory
Territorial changes	British East India Company takes control over all Maratha territories.

Belligerents
Maratha Empire: (Maratha Empire) Peshwa's Domains; Gwalior State; Indore State; Nagpur State; (Maratha Empire) Pindari Irregulars	East India Company

Commanders and leaders
Baji Rao II; Bapu Gokhale † (General of Baji Rao II); Hari Rao Holkar; Malhar Rao Holkar III; Mudhoji II Bhonsle; Trimbakji Dengle-Patil; Daulat Rao Scindhia	Francis Rawdon-Hastings; John Malcolm; Thomas Hislop

The Third Anglo-Maratha War (1817–1819) was the final and decisive conflict between the British East India Company and the Maratha Empire. The war left the Company in control of most of India. It began with an invasion of Maratha territory by East India Company troops, and although the British were outnumbered, the Maratha army was decimated. The troops were led by Governor General Hastings, supported by a force under General Thomas Hislop. Operations began against the Pindaris, a band of local mercenaries and Marathas from central India. (Note: "Thus, many Pindaris were originally Muslim or Maratha cavalrymen who were disbanded or found Pindari life better than formal military service... Most Pindaris professed to be Muslims, but some could not even repeat the kalima or Muslim creed nor knew the name of the prophet.")

Peshwa Baji Rao II's forces, supported by those of Mudhoji II Bhonsle of Nagpur and Malharrao Holkar III of Indore, rose against the East India Company. They attempted to regain the power that was taken away by the British due to the Treaty of Bassein. Pressure and diplomacy convinced the fourth major Maratha leader, Daulatrao Scindia of Gwalior, to remain neutral even though he lost control of Rajputana. British victories were swift, resulting in the breakup of the Maratha Empire and the end of Maratha power. Several minor battles were fought by the Peshwa's forces to prevent his capture.

The Peshwa was eventually captured and placed on a small estate at Bithur, near Kanpur. Most of his territory was annexed and became part of the Bombay Presidency. The Maharaja of Satara was restored as the ruler of his territory as a princely state. In 1848 this territory was also annexed by the Bombay Presidency under the doctrine of lapse policy of Lord Dalhousie. Bhonsle was defeated in the Battle of Sitabuldi and Holkar in the Battle of Mahidpur. The northern portion of Bhonsle's dominions in and around Nagpur, together with the Peshwa's territories in Bundelkhand, were annexed by British India as the Saugor and Nerbudda Territories. The defeat of the Bhonsle and Holkar also resulted in the acquisition of the Maratha kingdoms of Nagpur and Indore by the British. Along with Gwalior from Shinde and Jhansi from the Peshwa, all of these territories became princely states acknowledging British control. The British proficiency in Indian war-making was demonstrated through their rapid victories in Khadki, Sitabuldi, Mahidpur, and Satara.

== The Marathas and the British ==
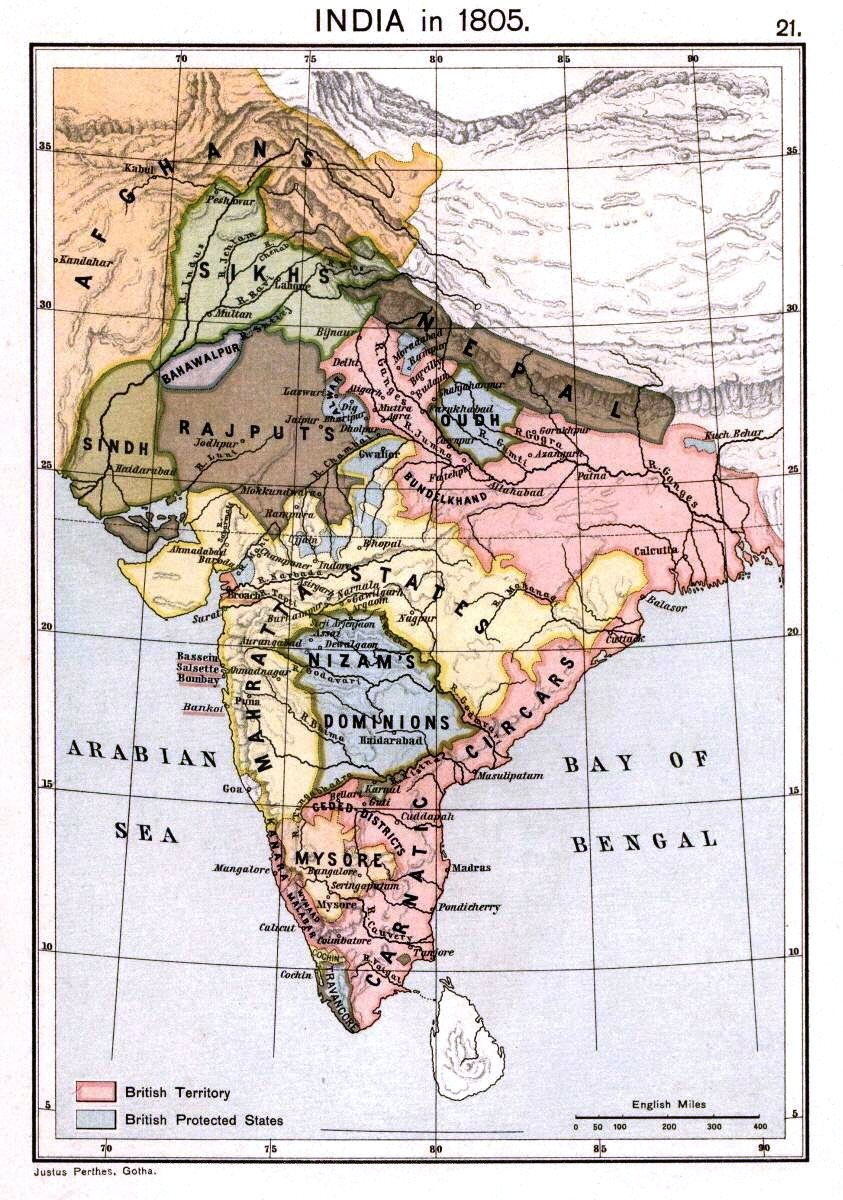
Map of India after the Second Anglo-Maratha War, 1805

The Maratha Empire was founded in 1674 by Chhatrapati Shivaji Maharaj the Bhosle dynasty. Shivaji Maharaj's capital was located at Raigad. Shivaji Maharaj successfully defended his empire from attacks by the Mughal Empire and his Maratha Empire went on to defeat and overtake it as the premier power in India within few decades. A key component of the Maratha administration was the council of eight ministers, called the Ashta Pradhan (council of eight). The senior-most member of the Ashta Pradhan was called the Peshwa or the Pant Pradhan (prime minister).

=== Growing British power ===
While the Marathas were fighting the Mughals in the early 18th century, the British held small trading posts in Bombay, Madras, and Calcutta. The British fortified the naval post of Mumbai after they saw the Marathas defeat the Portuguese at neighbouring Vasai in May 1739. In an effort to keep the Marathas out of Mumbai, the British sent envoys to negotiate a treaty. The envoys were successful, and a treaty was signed on 12 July 1739 that gave the British East India Company rights to free trade in Maratha territory. In the south, the Nizam of Hyderabad had enlisted the support of the French for his war against the Marathas. (Note: Meaning "Administrator of the Realm", the title of Nizam was specific to the native sovereigns of Hyderabad State, India, since 1719.) In reaction to this, the Peshwa requested support from the British, but was refused. Unable to see the rising power of the British, the Peshwa set a precedent by seeking their help to solve internal Maratha conflicts. Despite the lack of support, the Marathas managed to defeat the Nizam over a period of five years.

During the period 1750–1761, British defeated the French East India Company in India, and by 1793 they were firmly established in Bengal in the east and Madras in the south. They were unable to expand to the west as the Marathas were dominant there, but they entered Surat on the west coast via the sea.

The Marathas marched beyond the Indus as their empire grew. The responsibility for managing the sprawling Maratha empire in the north was entrusted to two Maratha leaders, Shinde and Holkar, as the Peshwa was busy in the south. The two leaders did not act in concert, and their policies were influenced by personal interests and financial demands. They alienated other Hindu rulers such as the Rajputs, the Jats, and the Rohillas, and they failed to diplomatically win over other Muslim leaders. A large blow to the Marathas came in their defeat on 14 January 1761 at Panipat against a combined Muslim force that gathered defeating Marathas led by the Afghan Ahmad Shah Abdali. An entire generation of Maratha leaders lay dead on the battlefield as a result of that conflict. However, between 1761 and 1773, the Marathas regained the lost ground in the north.

=== Anglo-Maratha relations ===
The Maratha gains in the north were undone because of the contradictory policies of Holkar and Shinde and the internal disputes in the family of the Peshwa, which culminated in the murder of Narayanrao Peshwa in 1773. Raghunathrao was ousted from the seat of Peshwa due to continuing internal Maratha rivalries. He sought help from the British, and they signed the Treaty of Surat with him in March 1775. This treaty gave him military assistance in exchange for control of Salsette Island and Bassein Fort.

The treaty set off discussions amongst the British in India as well as in Europe because of the serious implications of a confrontation with the powerful Marathas. Another cause for concern was that the Bombay Council had exceeded its constitutional authority by signing such a treaty. The treaty was the cause of the start of the First Anglo-Maratha War. (Note: This treaty, as Grant Duff says, occasioned infinite discussions amongst the British in India and in Europe, and started the First Maratha War.) This war was a Maratha victory and almost a stalemate, with no side being strong enough to completely defeat the other. The war concluded with the treaty of Salabai in May 1782, mediated by Mahadji Shinde. The foresight of Warren Hastings was the main reason for the success of the British in the war. He had destroyed the anti-British coalition and created a division between the Shinde, the Bhonsle, and the Peshwa. (Note: With justifiable pride Hastings wrote to one of his friends on 7 February 1783: "Indeed, my dear Sir, there have been three or four very critical periods in our affairs in which the existence of the Company and of the British dominion in India lay at my mercy and would have been lost had I coldly attended to the beaten path of duty and avoided personal responsibility. In the redress afforded to the Nizam I drew him to our interests from the most inveterate enmity. In my negotiations with Modajee Boosla (sic) I preserved these provinces from ravage and obtained evidence of his connections even beyond his own intentions; and I effected a peace and alliance with Madajee Sindhia (sic) which was in effect a peace with the Maratha State.")

The Marathas were still in a very strong position when the new Governor General of British controlled territories Cornwallis arrived in India in 1786. After the treaty of Salabai, the British followed a policy of coexistence in the north. The British and the Marathas enjoyed more than two decades of peace, thanks to the diplomacy of Nana Phadnavis, a minister in the court of the 11-year-old Peshwa Sawai Madhavrao. The situation changed soon after Nana's death in 1800. The power struggle between Holkar and Shinde caused Holkar to attack the Peshwa in Pune in 1801, since the Peshwa sided with Shinde. The Peshwa Baji Rao II fled Pune to safety on a British warship. Baji Rao feared loss of his own powers and signed the treaty of Bassein. This made Peshwa effectly become a client ruler of the British.

In response to the treaty, the Bhonsle and Shinde attacked the British, refusing to accept the betrayal of their sovereignty to the British by the Peshwa. This was the start of the Second Anglo-Maratha War in 1803. Both were defeated by the British, and all Maratha leaders lost large parts of their territory to the British.

=== Maratha-Hyderabad relations ===
In 1762, Raghunathrao allied with the Nizam due to mutual distrust and differences with Madhavrao Peshwa. The Nizam marched towards Poona, but little did he know that Rughunathrao was going to betray him. In 1763, Madhavrao I along with Raghunathrao defeated the Nizam at the Battle of Rakshasbhuvan and signed a treaty with the Marathas. In 1795, he was defeated by Madhavrao II's Marathas at the Battle of Kharda and was forced to cede Daulatabad, Aurangabad and Sholapur and pay an indemnity of Rs. 30 million. A French general, Monsieur Raymond, served as his military leader, strategist and advisor.

The Battle of Kharda took place in 1795 between the Nizam and the Maratha Confederacy, in which the Nizam was badly defeated. Governor General John Shore followed the policy of non-intervention despite the Nizam being under his protection which led to the loss of trust of the British. This was the last battle fought together by all the Maratha chiefs under leadership of Bakshibahadur Jivabadada Kerkar. The Maratha forces consisted of cavalry, including gunners, bowmen, artillery and infantry. After several skirmishes, the Nizams infantry under Raymond launched an attack on the Marathas but Scindia forces under Jivabadada Kerkar defeated them and launched a counterattack which proved to be decisive. The rest of the Hyderabad army fled to the fort of Kharda. The Nizam started negotiations and they were concluded in April 1795.

=== British East India Company ===
The British had travelled thousands of miles to arrive in India. They studied Indian geography and mastered local languages to deal with the Indians. (Note: "Opposed to these were the British who had come all the way from England to establish an empire in India. They had a (sic) previous experience not only in many European wars, but also in many Indian ones. Whatever they did, they did in a planned manner. No step was taken blindly. Everything was thoroughly discussed and debated upon before it was taken up. The network of their spies spread far and wide. They mastered the Indian languages to deal with the Indians in a perfect manner. They mastered Indian geography before they made any military movement in any part of the country. Nothing was left to chance and guess-work.") At the time, they were technologically advanced, with superior equipment in several critical areas to that available locally. Chhabra hypothesizes that even if the British technical superiority were discounted, they would have won the war because of the discipline and organization in their ranks. After the First Anglo-Maratha war, Warren Hastings declared in 1783 that the peace established with the Marathas was on such a firm ground that it was not going to be shaken for years to come.

The British believed that a new permanent approach was needed to establish and maintain continuous contact with the Peshwa's court in Pune. The British appointed Charles Malet, a senior merchant from Bombay, to be a permanent Resident at Pune because of his knowledge of the languages and customs of the region.

== War preparations ==
The Maratha Empire had partly declined due to the Second Anglo-Maratha War. Efforts to modernize the armies were half-hearted and undisciplined: newer techniques were not absorbed by the soldiers, while the older methods and experience were outdated and obsolete. The Maratha Empire lacked an efficient spy system, and had weak diplomacy compared to the British. Maratha artillery was outdated, and weapons were imported. Foreign officers were responsible for the handling of the imported guns; the Marathas never used their own men in considerable numbers for the purpose. Although Maratha infantry was praised by the likes of Wellington, they were poorly led by their generals and heavily relied on Arab and Pindari mercenaries. The confederate-like structure that evolved within the empire created a lack of unity needed for the wars.

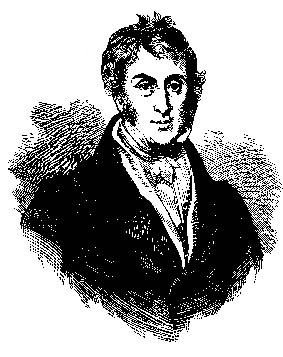
Mountstuart Elphinstone

At the time of the war, the power of the British East India Company was on the rise, whereas the Maratha Empire was on the decline. The British had been victorious in the previous Anglo-Maratha war and the Marathas were at their mercy. The Peshwa of the Maratha Empire at this time was Baji Rao II. Several Maratha leaders who had formerly sided with the Peshwa were now under British control or protection. The British had an arrangement with the Gaekwad dynasty of the Maratha province of Baroda to prevent the Peshwa from collecting revenue in that province. Gaekwad sent an envoy to the Peshwa in Pune to negotiate a dispute regarding revenue collection. The envoy, Gangadhar Shastri, was under British protection. He was murdered, and the Peshwa's minister Trimbak Dengle was suspected of the crime.

The British seized the opportunity to force Baji Rao into a treaty. The treaty (The Treaty of Poona) was signed on 13 June 1817. Key terms imposed on the Peshwa included the admission of Dengle's guilt, renouncing claims on Gaekwad, and surrender of significant swaths of territory to the British. These included his most important strongholds in the Deccan, the seaboard of Konkan, and all places north of the Narmada and south of the Tungabhadra rivers. The Peshwa was also not to communicate with any other powers in India. The British Resident Mountstuart Elphinstone also asked the Peshwa to disband his cavalry.

=== Maratha planning ===
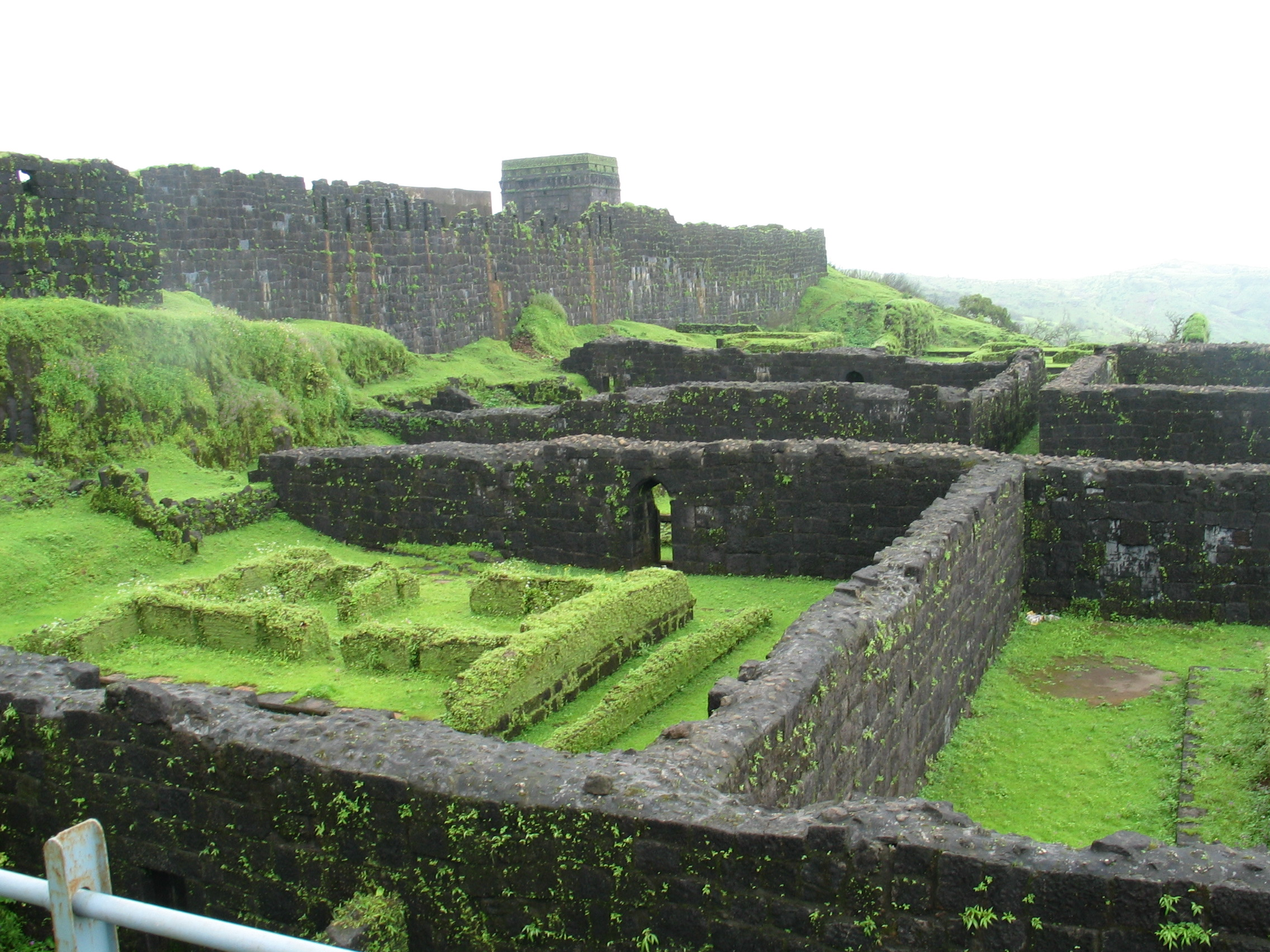
Ruins of the old palace at Raigad Fort

The Peshwa disbanded his cavalry, but secretly asked them to stand by, and offered them seven months' advance pay. Baji Rao entrusted Bapu Gokhale with preparations for war. In August 1817, the forts at Sinhagad, Raigad, and Purandar were fortified by the Peshwa. Gokhale secretly recruited troops for the impending war. Many Bhils and Ramoshis were hired. Efforts were made to unify Bhonsle, Shinde, and Holkar; even the mercenary Pindaris were approached. The Peshwa identified unhappy Marathas in the service of the British Resident Elphinstone and secretly recruited them. One such person was Jaswant Rao Ghorpade. Efforts were made to secretly recruit Europeans as well, which failed. Some people, such as Balaji Pant Natu, stood steadfastly with the British. Several of the sepoys rejected the Peshwa's offers, and others reported the matter to their superior officers. On 19 October 1817, Baji Rao II celebrated the Dassera festival in Pune, where troops were assembled in large numbers. During the celebrations, a large flank of the Maratha cavalry pretended they were charging towards the British sepoys but wheeled off at the last minute. This display was intended as a slight towards Elphinstone and as a scare tactic to prompt the defection and recruitment of British sepoys to the Peshwa's side. The Peshwa made plans to kill Elphinstone, despite opposition from Gokhale. Elphinstone was fully aware of these developments thanks to the espionage work of Balaji Pant Natu and Ghorpade.

Maratha powers were estimated at 81,000 infantry, 106,000 horse or cavalry and 589 guns. Of these the Peshwa had the highest number of cavalry at 28,000, along with 14,000 infantry and 37 cannon. The Peshwa headquarters was in Pune. Holkar had the second largest cavalry, amounting to 20,000, and an infantry force supplemented with 107 artillery units. Shinde and Bhonsle had similar numbers of cavalry, artillery and infantry. Holkar, Shinde and Bhonsle were headquartered in Indore, Gwalior and Nagpur respectively. The Afghan leader Amir Khan was located in Tonk in Rajputana and his strength was 12,000 cavalry, 10,000 infantry and 200 guns. The Pindaris were located north of the Narmada valley in Chambal and Malwa region of central India. Three Pindari leaders sided with Shinde, these were Chitu Khan, Karim Khan and Wasil Mohammad. They led horsemen with strengths of 10,000, 6,000 and 4,000 but most were armed only with spears. The rest of the Pindari chiefs, Tulsi, Imam Baksh, Sahib Khan, Kadir Baksh, Nathu and Bapu were allied with Holkar. Tulsi and Imam Baksh each had 2,000 horsemen, Kadir Baksh, 21,500. Sahib Khan, Nathu and Bapu had 1,000, 750 and 150 horsemen.

=== British planning ===
The East India Company viewed the killing of their envoy, Gangadhar Shastri, as definitive intent by the Peshwa to undermine British control over the Maratha, and operations were commenced in order to place the entire region effectually into the possession of the Company. Although some regard the war as a mopping-up operation of the earlier Second Anglo-Maratha war, historians note the fact that the British assembled the largest army they had ever at that time organised in India indicated the importance the British placed on defeating the Maratha. The army, numbering roughly 120,000 men, consisted of the Grand Army or Bengal Army under the command of the Marquess of Hastings, and the Army of the Deccan under General Hislop. This included over 60 battalions of Native Infantry, multiple battalions derived from British regiments, numerous sections of cavalry and dragoons, in addition to artillery, horse artillery and rocket troops, all armed with the most modern weapons and equipped with highly organised supply lines.

This massive force quickly induced Shinde, who was secretly planning with the Peshwa and the Nepal Ministry to form a coalition against the British, into coming to terms with the British. In early November 1817, he was forced to enter into a treaty in which he ceded all his armed forces and major forts. Amir Khan disbanded his army on condition of being guaranteed the possession of the principality of Tonk in Rajputana. He sold his guns to the British and agreed to prevent predatory gangs from operating from his territory. By these actions, the British kept two major allies of the Maratha out of the war before any hostilities had begun.

== Major events of the war ==
=== Conflict in Pune and the pursuit of Baji Rao II ===
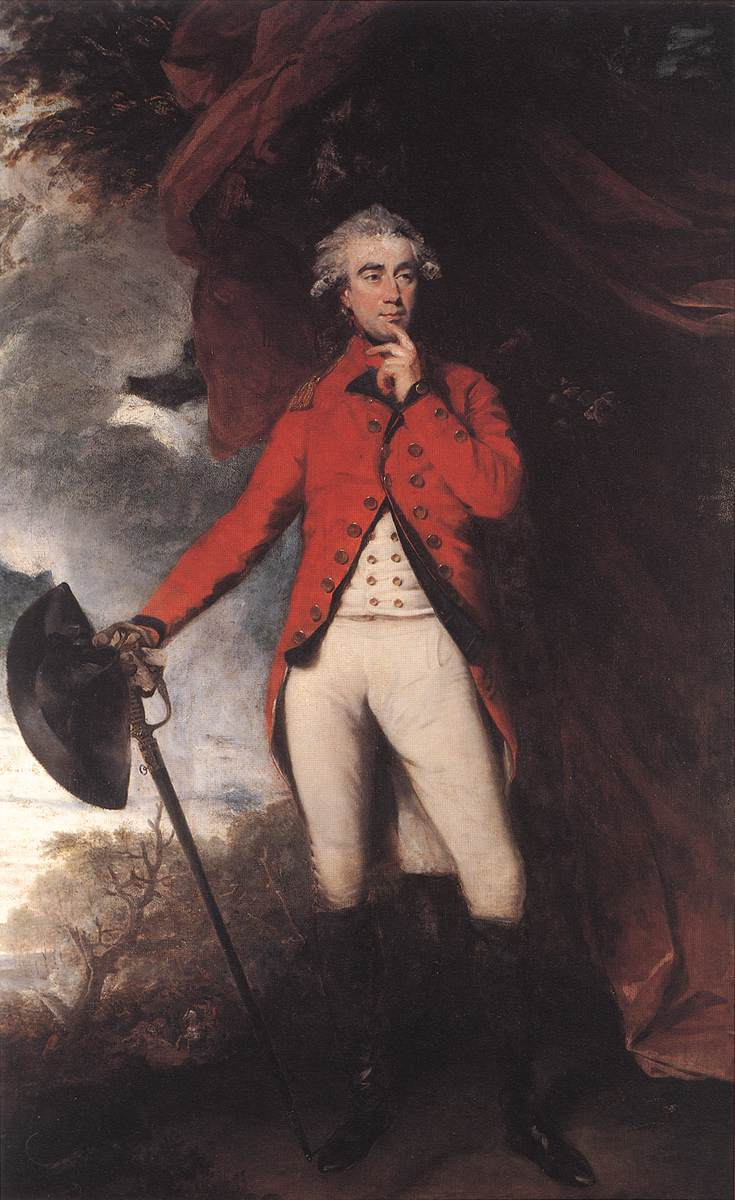
Portrait of Lord Moira (Joshua Reynolds, 1790)

The war began as a campaign against the Pindaris, but the first battle occurred at Pune where the Peshwa, Baji Rao II, attacked the under-strength British cantonment on 5 November 1817. The Maratha forces comprised 20,000 cavalry, 8,000 infantry, and 20 artillery guns whereas the British had 2,000 cavalry, 1,000 infantry, and eight artillery units. What followed was the Battle of Khadki where the Maratha were initially successful in creating and exploiting a gap in the British lines, but were soon nullified by the advance of the British infantry, which firing volley after volley, caused the Maratha to retreat in a matter of four hours. The British soon claimed victory with the loss of 86 men compared to the 500 Maratha killed.

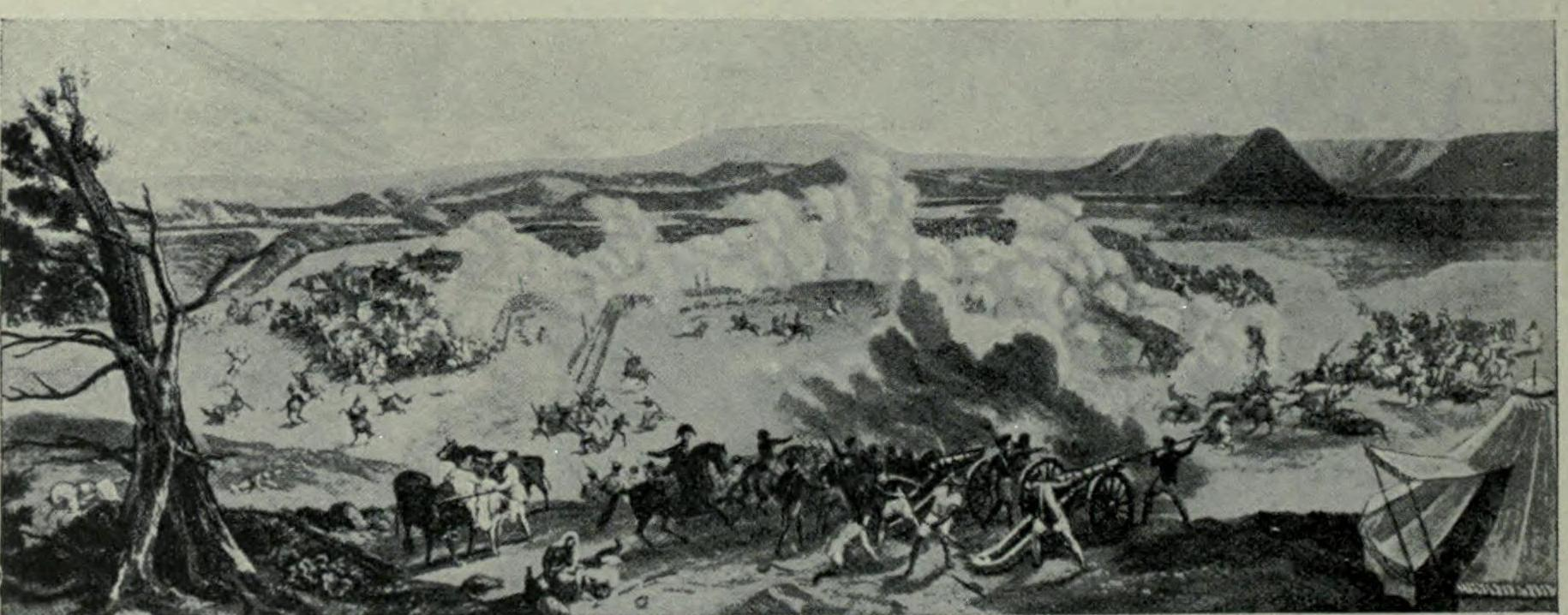
Battle of Khadki, 1817

While Pune was surrendered to the British, the Peshwa and his forces fled first to Purandar and then toward the city of Satara. His commander-in-chief Bapu Gokhale organised the retreat to guard the Peshwa in flight. The Peshwa then fled to the town of Koregaon where the Battle of Koregaon (also known as the battle of Koregaon Bhima) took place on 1 January 1818 on the banks of the river Bhima, north west of Pune. Captain Stauton arrived near Koregaon along with 500 infantry, two six-pounder guns, and 200 irregular horsemen. Only 24 of the infantry were of European origin; they were from the Madras Artillery. The rest of the infantry was composed of Indian sepoys employed by the British. A fierce battle ensued that lasted the entire day. Streets and guns were captured and recaptured, changing hands several times. Although Baji Rao's commander Trimabkji killed Lieutenant Chishom, the Marathas were forced to evacuate the village and retreated during the night. The British lost 175 men and about a third of the irregular horse, with more than half of the European officers wounded. The Marathas lost 500 to 600 men.

After the battle the British forces under general Pritzler pursued the Peshwa, who fled southwards towards Karnataka with the Raja of Satara. The Peshwa continued his flight southward throughout the month of January. Not receiving support from the Raja of Mysore, the Peshwa doubled back and passed General Pritzler to head towards Solapur. Until 29 January the pursuit of the Peshwa had not been productive. Whenever Baji Rao was pressed by the British, Gokhale and his light troops hovered around the Peshwa and fired long shots. Some skirmishes took place, and the Marathas were frequently hit by shells from the horse artillery. There was, however, no advantageous result to either party. On 7 February General Smith entered Satara and captured the royal palace of the Marathas. He symbolically raised the British flag.

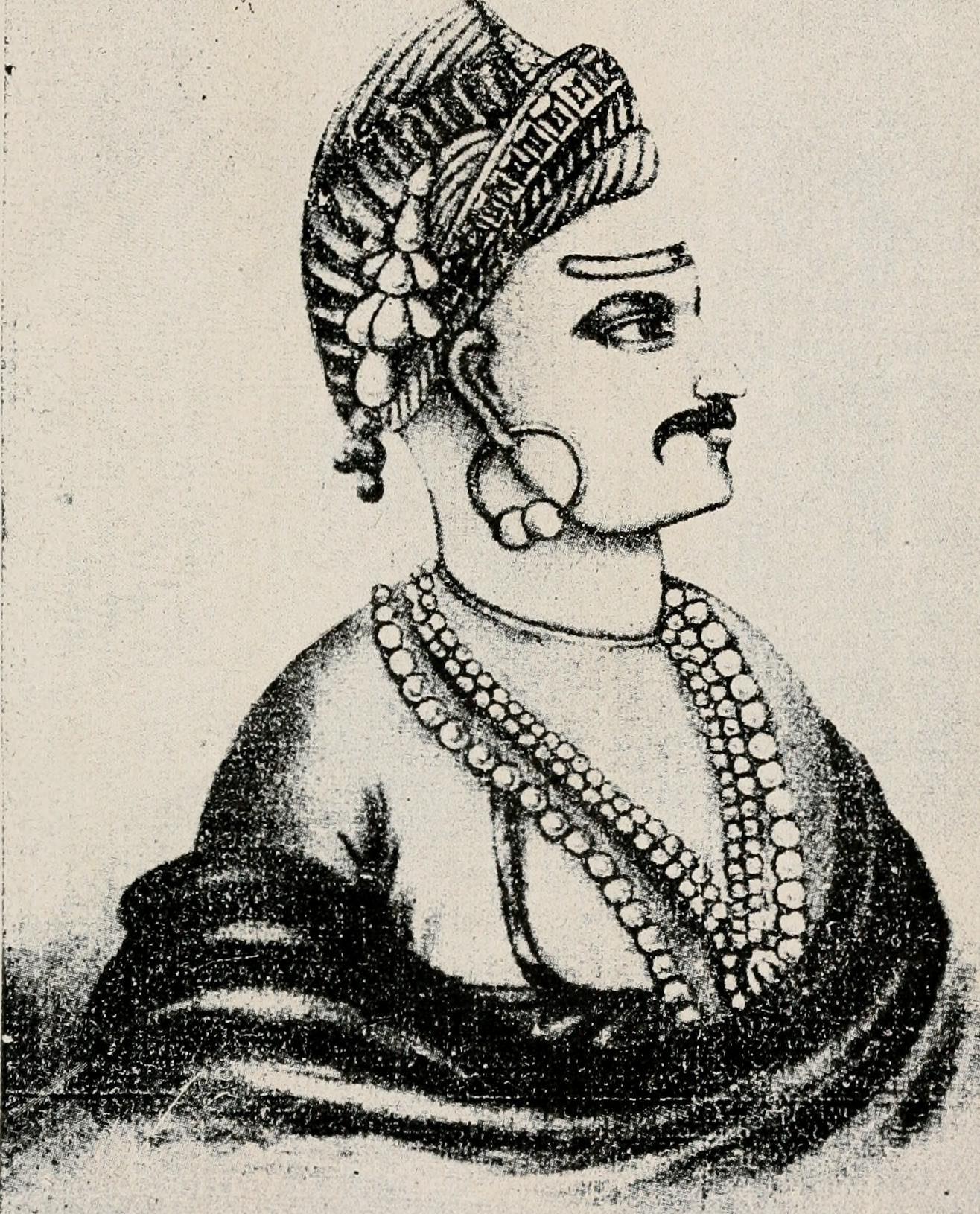
Bajirao II

On 19 February, General Smith got word that the Peshwa was headed for Pandharpur. General Smith's troops attacked the Peshwa at Ashti en route. During this battle, Gokhale died while defending the Peshwa from the British. The Raja of Satara was captured along with his brother and mother. The death of Gokhale and the skirmish at Ashti hastened the end of the war. By 10 April 1818, General Smith's forces had taken the forts of Sinhagad and Purandar. Mountstuart Elphinstone mentions the capture of Sinhagadh in his diary entry for 13 February 1818: "The garrison contained no Marathas, but consisted of 100 Arabs, 600 Gosains, and 400 Konkani. The Qiladar was a boy of eleven; the garrison was treated with great liberality; and, though there was much property and money in the place, the Qiladar was allowed to have whatever he claimed as his own." (Note: Qiladar means the commandant of a fort, castle or garrison.)

On 3 June 1818 BajiRao II surrendered to the British and negotiated the sum of ₹ eight lakhs as annual maintenance. Baji Rao II obtained promises from the British in favour of the Jagirdars, his family, the Brahmins, and religious institutions. The Peshwa was sent to Bithur near Kanpur. While the downfall and banishment of the Peshwa was mourned all over the Maratha Empire as a national defeat, the Peshwa contracted more marriages and spent his long life engaged in religious performances and excessive drinking.

=== Conflict with the Pindaris ===
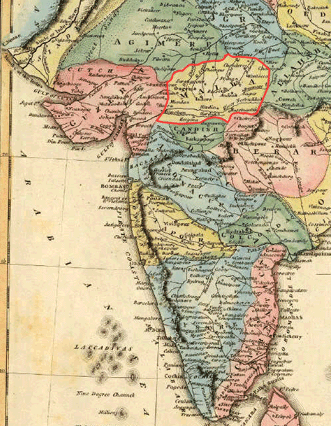
Location of Malwa in an 1823 depiction of India. Malwa was the headquarters of some of the Pindaris in the early 19th century

The Pindaris, who were mostly cavalry armed with spears, came to be known as the Shindeshahi and the Holkarshahi after the patronage they received from the respective Maratha leaders. The major Pindari leaders were Chitu Khan, Karim Khan, and Wasil Mohammad and their total strength was estimated at 33,000. The Pindaris frequently raided villages in Central India and it was thought that this region was being rapidly reduced to the condition of a desert because the peasants were unable to support themselves on the land. In 1815, 25,000 Pindaris entered the Madras Presidency and destroyed over 300 villages on the Coromandel coast. Other Pindari raids on British territory followed in 1816 and 1817 and therefore Francis Rawdon-Hastings wanted the Pindaris extinguished.

In opposition to what the British forces expected as they entered the region in late 1817, they found that the Pindaris had not devastated the area. In fact the British found a super-abundance of food and forage, especially grain, which added immensely to the security of their supplies. The Pindaris were attacked, and their homes were surrounded and destroyed. General Hislop from the Madras Residency attacked the Pindaris from the south and drove them beyond the Narmada river, where governor-general Francis Rawdon-Hastings was waiting with his army. With the principal routes from Central India being occupied by British detachments, the Pindari forces were completely broken up, scattered in the course of a single campaign. Being armed only with spears, they made no stand against the regular troops, and even in small bands they were unable to escape the ring of forces drawn around them.

The Pindari forces proved unable to counter the British and the Pindari chiefs were soon reduced to the condition of hunted outlaws. Karim and Chitu had still 23,000 soldiers between them but such a force was no match for the armies that surrounded them. In whatever direction they turned they were met by British forces; defeat followed defeat. Many fled to the jungles, while others sought refuge in the villages, but were killed without mercy by local villagers who had not forgotten the sufferings inflicted upon them by the Pindaris. All the leaders had surrendered before the end of February 1818 and the Pindari system and power was brought to a close. They were removed to Gorakhptir where they obtained grants of land for their subsistence. Karim Khan became a farmer on the small estate he received beyond the Ganges in Gorakpur. Wasil Mohammed attempted to escape, and after he was found Mohammed committed suicide by imbibing poison. Chitu, another Pindari warrior, was hunted by John Malcolm from place to place until he had no followers left. He vanished into the jungles of Central India in 1819 and was killed by a tiger. (Note: Chithu is referred to as Setu in Marathi. "So the famous Chithu, the Pindari chieftain, who, wandering alone in the jungle on the banks of the Tapti River after the defeat and dispersal of his robber horde in 1818, fell a victim to a man-eating tiger, his remains being identified by the discovery of his head and a satchel containing his papers in the tiger's lair.")

=== Events in Nagpur ===
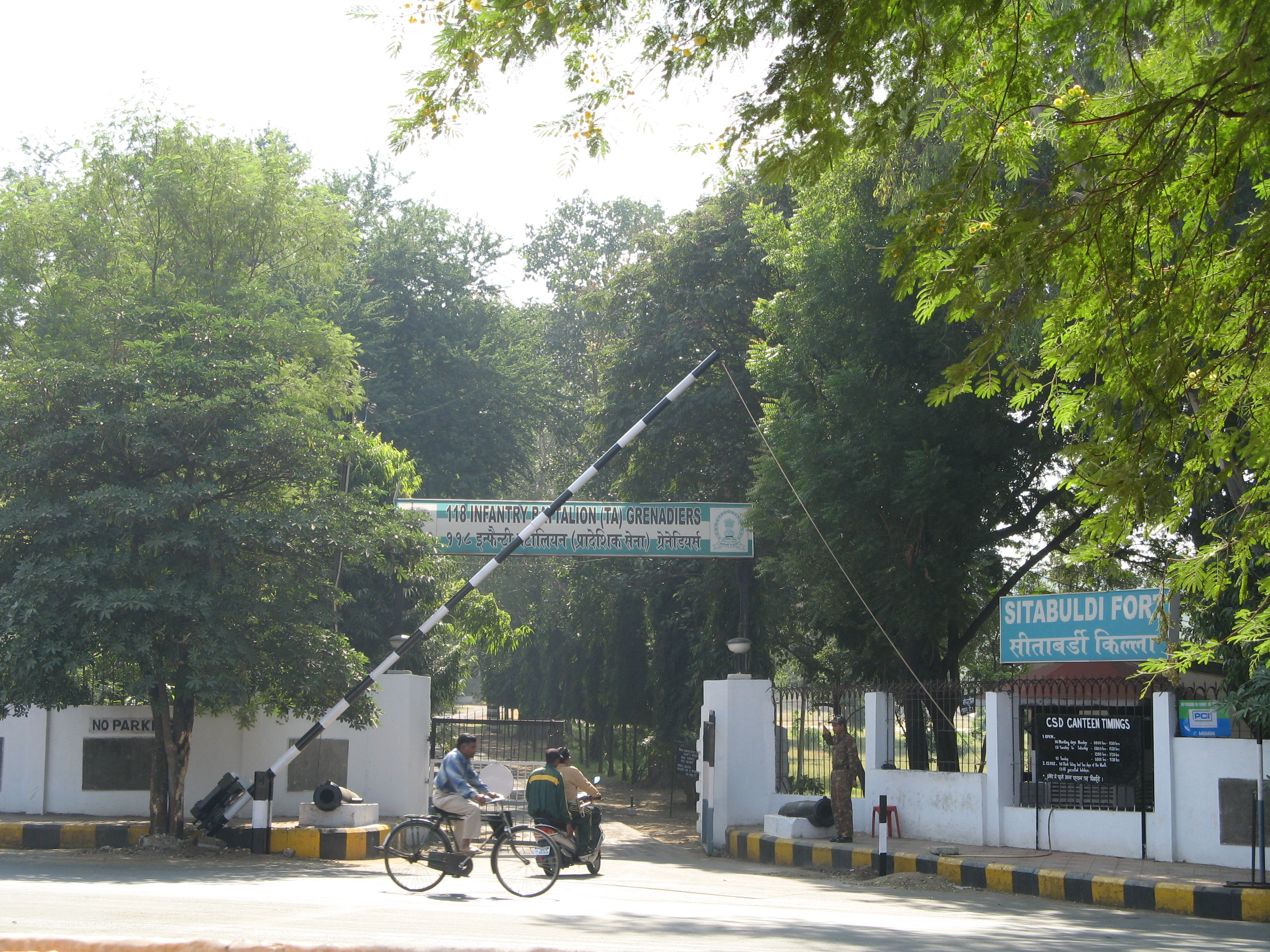
Sitabuldi Fort today

Mudhoji Bhonsle, also known as Appa Saheb, consolidated his power in Nagpur after the murder of his cousin, the imbecile ruler Parsoji Bhonsle, and entered into a treaty with the British on 27 May 1816. He ignored the request of the British Resident Jenkins to refrain from contact with Baji Rao II. Jenkins asked Appa Saheb to disband his growing concentration of troops and come to the residency, which he also refused to do. Appa Saheb openly declared support for the Peshwa, who was already fighting the British near Pune. As it was now clear that a battle was in the offing, Jenkins asked for reinforcements from nearby British East India Company troops. He already had about 1,500 men under Lieutenant Colonel Hopentoun Scott. Jenkins sent word for Colonel Adams to march to Nagpur with his troops. Like other Maratha leaders, Appa Shaeb employed Arabs in his army. They were typically involved in holding fortresses. While they were known to be among the bravest of troops, they were not amenable to discipline and mostly armed with only matchlocks and swords. The total strength of the Marathas was about 18,000.

The British Residency was to the west of the Sitabuldi Fort located close to Nagpur. The British East India Company troops occupied the north end of the hillock associated with the fort. The Marathas, fighting with the Arabs, made good initial gains by charging up the hill and forcing the British to retreat to the south. British commanders began arriving with reinforcements: Lieutenant Colonel Rahan on 29 November, Major Pittman on 5 December, and Colonel Doveton on 12 December. The British counterattack was severe and Appa Saheb was forced to surrender. A force of 5,000 Arabs and Hindustanis however remained secured within the walls of Nagpur with the British laying siege to the city from 19 December. Attempts by the British to breach the walls failed with the loss of over 300 men, of which 24 were Europeans. The British agreed to pay the defenders 50,000 rupees to abandon Nagpur, which they did on 30 December. A treaty was signed on 9 January 1818. Appa Saheb was allowed to rule over nominal territories with several restrictions. Most of his territory, including the forts, was now controlled by the British. They built additional fortifications on Sitabuldi.

A few days later Appa Saheb was arrested. He was being escorted to Allahabad when he escaped to Punjab to seek refuge with the Sikhs. They turned him down and he was captured once again by the British near Jodhpur. Raja Mansingh of Jodhpur stood surety for him and he remained in Jodhpur, where he died on 15 July 1849 at 44 years of age.

=== Events in Indore ===
Map of India after the Third Anglo-Maratha War, 1819

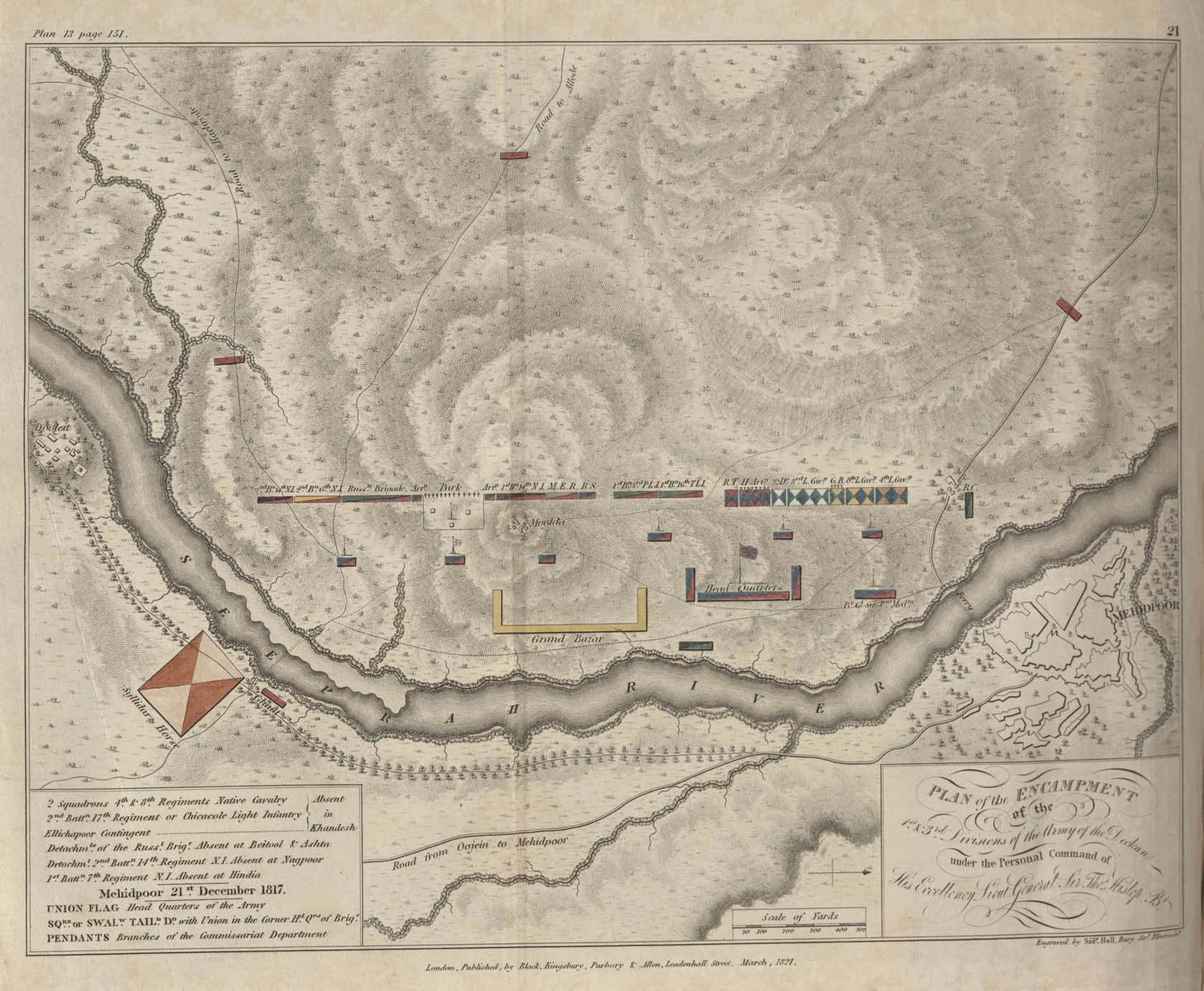
Battle of Mehidpoor 2nd position, 21 Dec 1817

The Court of Holkar, based at Indore, was at this time practically nonexistent. The dynasty was headed by 11-year-old Malhar Rao Holkar III under the regency of his dead father's mistress Tulsi Bai Holkar. Tulsi Bai was executed by her own troops in December 1817 for allying with the British; soon after, the British advanced into Holkar's territory, encountering his army about 40 km north of Indore at the Battle of Mahidpur.

The battle of Mahidpur between Holkar and the British was fought on 21 December 1817, lasting from midday until 3:00 am. Lieutenant General Thomas Hislop was commander of the British forces which came in sight of the Holkar army at about 9:00 am. The British lost around 800 men but Holkar's force was destroyed, with about 3,000 killed or wounded. These losses effectively knocked the Holkar out of the conflict and broke the power of the Holkar dynasty. The Battle of Mahidpur also proved to be a major setback for the Marathas as well. Henry Durand wrote, "After the battle of Mahidpur not only the Peshwa's but the real influence of the Mahratta States of Holkar and Shinde were dissolved and replaced by British supremacy." The remnants of Holkar's army were pursued across the territory by the British, suffering further casualties in small-scale skirmishes. Holkar was captured and his ministers made overtures of peace, and on 6 January 1818 the Treaty of Mandeswar was signed; Holkar accepted the British terms in totality. Large quantities of spoils of war was taken by the British, which remained an acrimonious issue for many years afterwards. Holkar came under British authority as a puppet prince subject to the advice of a British Resident.

== Operations against remaining Maratha forces ==
By mid 1818, all of the Maratha leaders had surrendered to the British. Shinde and the Afghan Amir Khan were subdued by the use of diplomacy and pressure, which resulted in the Treaty of Gwalior on 5 November 1817. Under this treaty, Shinde surrendered Rajasthan to the British and agreed to help them fight the Pindaris. Amir Khan agreed to sell his guns to the British and received a land grant at Tonk in Rajputana. Holkar was defeated on 21 December 1817 and signed the Treaty of Mandeswar on 6 January 1818. Under this treaty the Holkar state became subsidiary to the British. The young Malhar Rao was raised to the throne. Bhonsle was defeated on 26 November 1817 and was captured but he escaped to live out his life in Jodhpur. The Peshwa surrendered on 3 June 1818 and was sent off to Bithur near Kanpur under the terms of the treaty signed on 3 June 1818. Of the Pindari leaders, Karim Khan surrendered to Malcolm in February 1818; Wasim Mohammad surrendered to Shinde and eventually poisoned himself; and Setu was killed by a tiger.

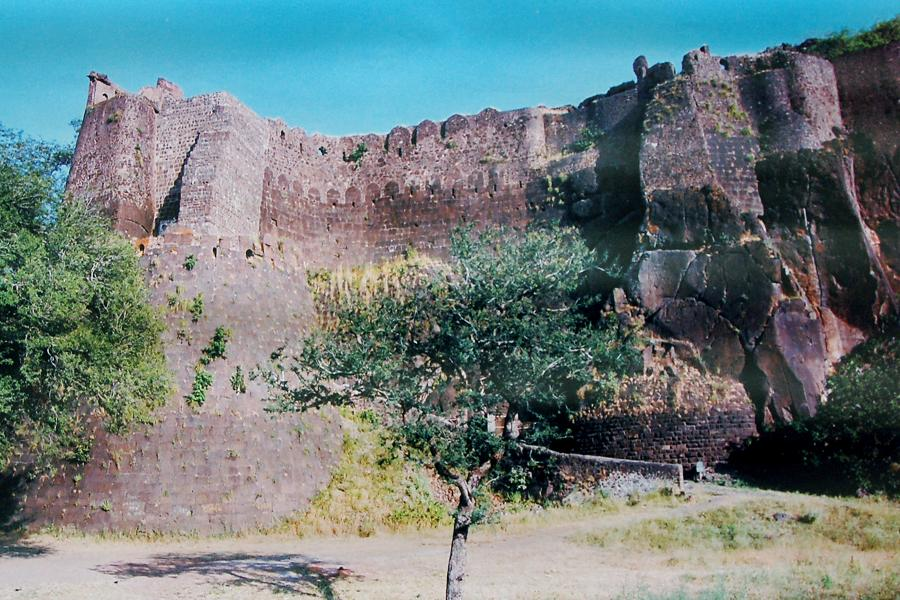
Asirgarh Fort

During the last stages of the conflict, from 1818 to 1819, British military operations switch to capturing Maratha-held forts which were still holding out under the command of their qiladars. On February 27, 1818, British forces under the command of Sir Thomas Hislop approached Thalner Fort, assuming it was friendly; the fort's qilidar, Tulsiram Mama, ordered his troops to fire on the British, outraging Hislop who laid siege to the fort. After ordering several bombardments against the fort walls, he personally led a storming party which captured the fort and overwhelmed its garrison (which was composed mostly of Arab soldiers). Mama was tried and executed for perfidy, and was hung on a nearby tree. Other forts in the region, such as Naralla Fort and Malegaon Fort were gradually captured and occupied by the British. At Malegaon Fort, the British encountered unexpectedly strong resistance from the fort garrison, which led them to bring in a 2,600-strong reinforcement force consisting of a mixture of infantry and artillery, after which a storming party captured the fort.

In early 1819, almost all of the forts had been taken, with the lone holdout being Asirgarh Fort, which was under the command of qiladar Jeswant Rao Lar. In March of that year, a massive British contingent lay siege to Asirgarh, capturing and occupying the town next to the fort to serve as a temporary base of operations. The 1,200-strong garrison was subject to constant artillery bombardments before the British launched an assault, which led to the fort's capture on 9 April. With the capture of Asirgarh Fort, the British victory was complete and all military operations ceased.

== Aftermath ==
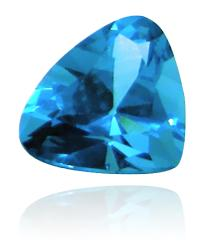
The Nassak Diamond was seized from the Peshwa by the British and sent to London

The war left the British, under the auspices of the British East India Company, in control of virtually all of present-day India south of the Sutlej River, either through direct British rule, or through princely states. The famed Nassak Diamond was seized by the Company as part of the spoils of the war. The British acquired large chunks of territory from the Maratha Empire and in effect put an end to their most dynamic opposition. The terms of surrender Malcolm offered to the Peshwa were controversial amongst the British for being too liberal: The Peshwa was offered a luxurious life near Kanpur and given a pension of about 80,000 pounds. A comparison was drawn with Napoleon, who was then confined to a small rock in the southern Atlantic and given a small sum for his maintenance. Trimbakji Dengale was captured after the war and was sent to the fortress of Chunarin Bengal where he spent the rest of his life. With all active resistance over, John Malcolm played a prominent part in capturing and pacifying the remaining fugitives.

The Peshwa's territories were absorbed into the Bombay Presidency and the territory seized from the Pindaris eventually became the nucleus of the Central Provinces of British India. The princes of Rajputana were effectively reduced to feudal lords who accepted the British as the paramount power. Thus Hastings redrew the map of India to a state which remained more or less unaltered until the time of Lord Dalhousie. The British recognised Pratap Singh (Raja of Satara), a direct descendant of Shivaji as the ceremonial head of the Maratha Confederacy. Raghuji Bhonsle III, then not even ten years old, was appointed as the ruler of Nagpur under British guardianship. The Peshwa adopted a son, Nana Sahib, who went on to be one of the leaders of the Rebellion of 1857. After 1818, Mountstuart Elphinstone reorganized the administrative divisions for revenue collection, thus reducing the importance of the Patil, the Deshmukh, and the Deshpande.

The new government felt a need to communicate with the local Marathi-speaking population; Elphinstone pursued a policy of planned standardization of the Marathi language in the Bombay Presidency starting after 1820.

== See also ==
- Maratha Empire
- First Anglo-Maratha War
- Second Anglo-Maratha War
