= Ragojee Bhonsla =

Ragojee Bhonsla may refer to:

- Raghoji I Bhonsle (1695–1755)
- Raghoji II Bhonsle (died 1816)
- Raghoji III Bhonsle (1808?–1853), grandson of Raghoji II Bhonsle
