= Kingdom of Nagpur =

Polity in the Maratha Confederacy (1739–1853)

Coordinates: 21.15°N 79.09°E

- 1739–1853
- Flag

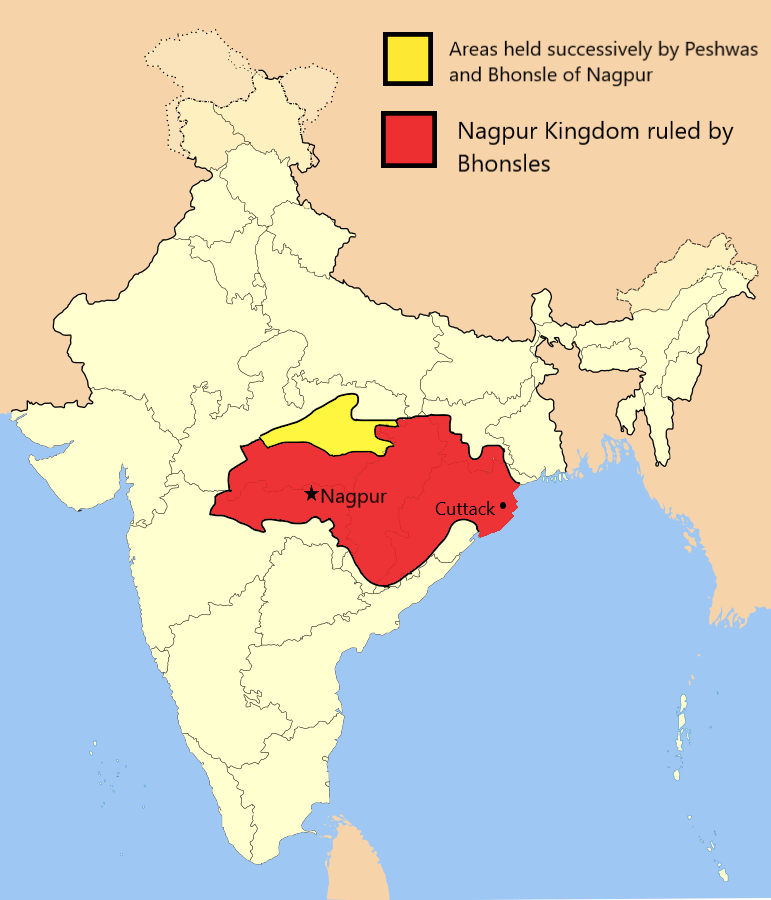
- The Kingdom of Nagpur at its greatest extent.
- Status: State within the Maratha Empire (1729–1818); Protectorate of the East India Company (1818–1853)
- Capital: Nagpur
- Common languages: Marathi (official and court language); Other Indian languages
- Government: Monarchy
- Raja
  - 1739–1755 (first): Raghoji I
  - 1818–1853 (last): Raghoji III
- History
  - Founded by Raghoji I after making Burhan Shah a state pensionary.: 1739
  - British Protectorate: 1818
  - Death of the last ruler, Raghoji III: 1853

Area
- 217,560 km^{2} (84,000 sq mi)
Preceded by
Gonds of Deogarh
Marathas of Saugor
Kingdom of Chanda
Garha Kingdom
Succeeded by
Nagpur Province
- Today part of: India
- Princely States of India – Nagpur

The Kingdom of Nagpur was a kingdom within the Maratha Empire in the 18th and 19th centuries. It was ruled by the Maratha Bhonsle dynasty in the mid-18th century. The city of Nagpur was the capital of the state.

After the Third Anglo-Maratha War, it became a princely state of the British Empire in 1818, and was annexed to British India in 1853 becoming Nagpur Province.

== History ==
=== Gond kingdom ===
The historical record of the Nagpur kingdom begins in the early 18th century, when it formed part of the Gond Kingdom of Deogarh. Bakht Buland Shah, the ruler of Deogarh, visited Delhi during the reign of Aurangzeb and converted to Islam. Afterwards, determined to encourage the development of his own kingdom, he invited Hindu and Muslim artisans and cultivators to settle in the plains country, and founded the city of Nagpur. His successor, Chand Sultan, continued the development of the country, and moved his capital to Nagpur. After the death of Chand Sultan, the Bhonsles took over the control of the kingdom.

After Chand Sultan's death in 1739, there was quarrel over the succession, leading to the throne being usurped by Wali Shah, an illegitimate son of Bakht Buland Shah. Chand Sultan's widow invoked the aid of the Maratha leader Raghuji Bhonsle of Berar in the interest of her sons Akbar Shah and Burhan Shah. Wali Shah was put to death and the rightful heirs placed on the throne. Raghoji I Bhonsle was sent back to Berar with a plentiful bounty for his aid. The Maratha general judged that Nagpur must be a plentiful and rich country by the magnificence of his reward.

However, dissensions continued between the brothers and once again, the elder brother Burhan Shah requested the aid of Raghuji Bhonsla. Akbar Shah was driven into exile and finally poisoned at Hyderabad. However this time, Ragoji Bhonsle did not intend to leave such a rich country, with it being within his grasp. He declared himself 'protector' of the Gond king. Thus in 1743, Burhan Shah was practically made a state pensionary, with real power being in the hands of the Maratha ruler. After this event the history of the Gond kingdom of Deogarh is not recorded. A series of Maratha rulers came to power following the fall of the Gonds from the throne of Nagpur, starting with Raghoji Bhonsle.

=== Maratha Bhonsle kingdom ===
==== Raghoji I Bhonsle (1739–1755) ====
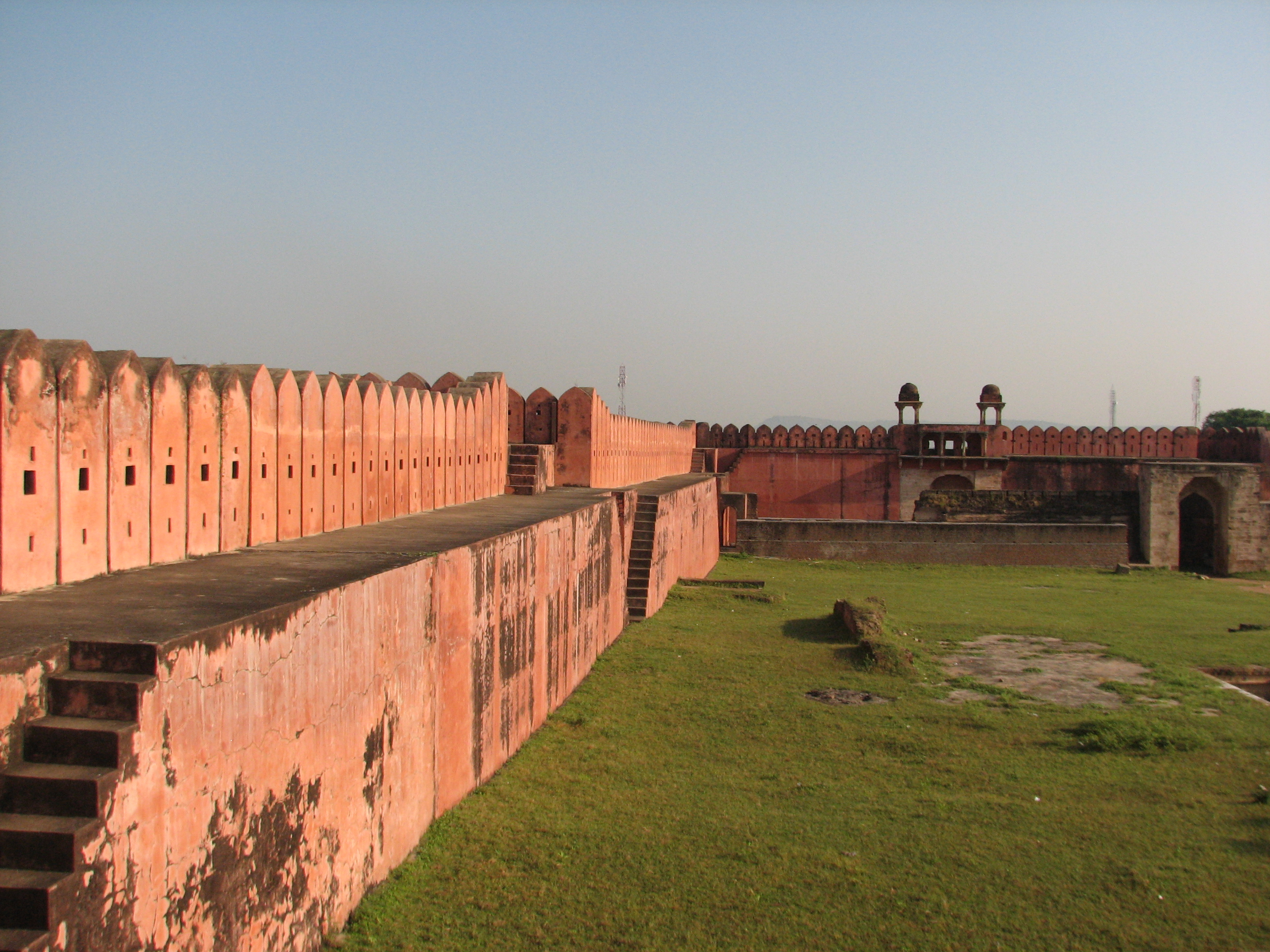
An inside view of Nagardhan Fort in Nagpur district, commissioned by Raghoji I.

Bold and decisive in action, Raghoji was the archetype of a Maratha leader; he saw in the troubles of other states an opening for his own ambition, and did not even require a pretext for plunder and invasion. Twice his armies invaded Bengal, and he obtained the cession of Cuttack. Chanda, Chhattisgarh, and Sambalpur were added to his dominions between 1745 and 1755, the year of his death.

==== Janoji, Madhoji I, and Raghoji II Bhonsle (1755–1816) ====
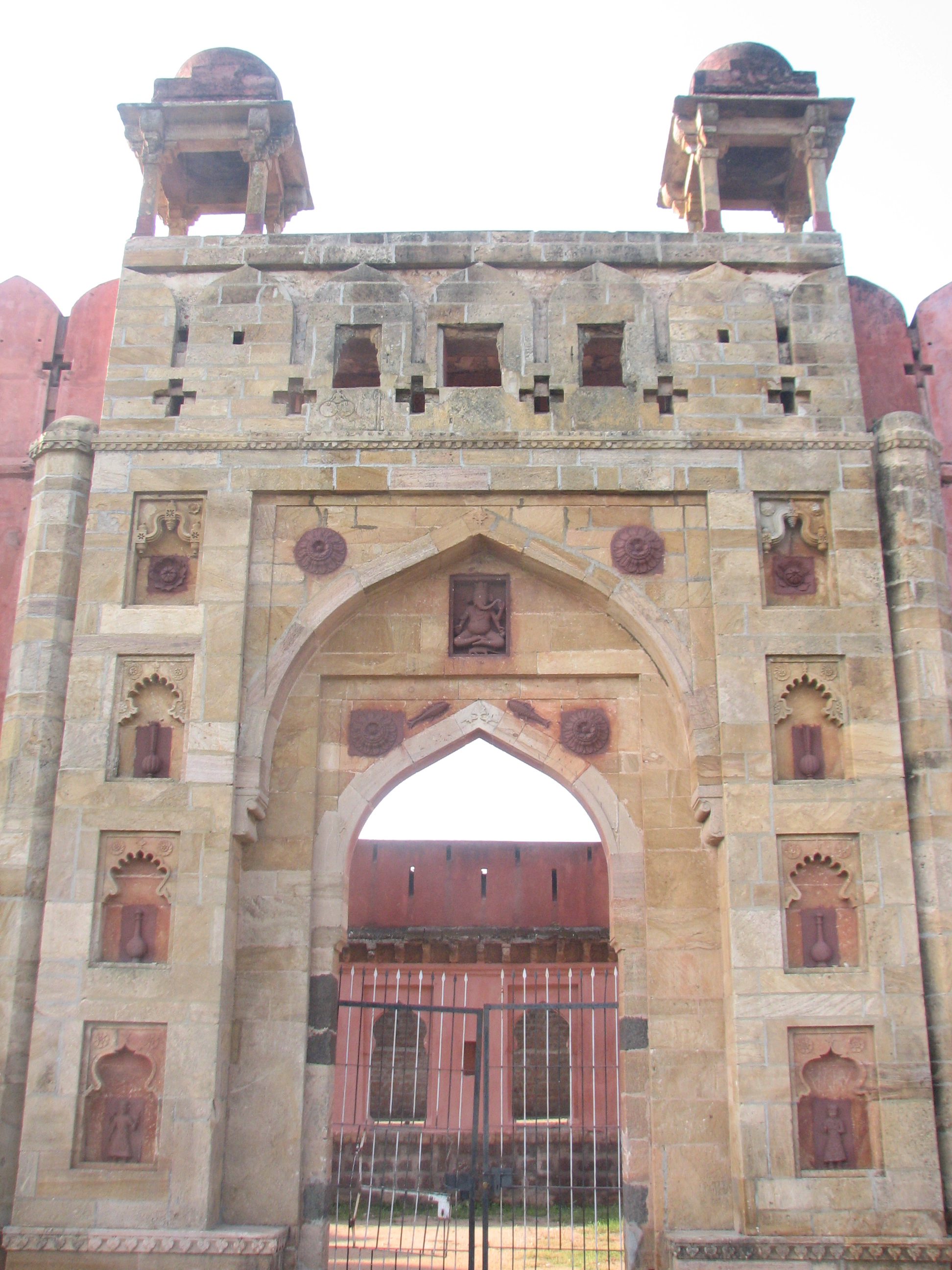
Main entrance of the Nagardhan Fort, built by the Bhonsle dynasty of the Maratha Confederacy

His successor Janoji Bhonsle took part in the wars between the Peshwa and the Nizam of Hyderabad. After he had in turn betrayed both of them, they united against him and sacked and burnt Nagpur in 1765.

On Janoji's death on 21 May 1772, his brothers fought for the succession, until Mudhoji Bhonsle shot the other in the Battle of Panchgaon, six miles (10 km) south of Nagpur, and succeeded to the regency on behalf of his infant son Raghoji II Bhonsle who was Janoji's adopted heir. In 1785 Mandla and the upper Narmada valley were added to the Nagpur dominions by treaty with the Peshwa. Mudhoji had courted the favor of the British East India Company, and this policy was continued for some time by Raghoji II, who acquired Hoshangabad and the lower Narmada valley. But in 1803 he united with Daulat Rao Sindhia of Gwalior against the British. The two leaders were decisively defeated at the battles of Assaye and Argaon, and by the Treaty of Deogaon of that year Raghoji ceded Cuttack, southern Berar, and Sambalpur to the British, although Sambalpur was not relinquished until 1806.

Until the close of the 18th century the Maratha administration had been on the whole good, and the country had prospered. The first four of the Bhonsles were military chiefs with the habits of rough soldiers, connected by blood and by constant familiar interaction with all their principal officers. Up to 1792 their territories were seldom the theater of hostilities, and the area of cultivation and revenue continued to increase under a fairly equitable and extremely simple system of government. After the treaty of Deogaon, however, all this changed. Raghoji II was deprived of a third of his territories, and he attempted to make up the loss of revenue from the remainder. The villages were mercilessly rack-rented, and many new taxes imposed. The pay of the troops was in arrears, and they maintained themselves by plundering the cultivators. At the same time the raids of the Pindaris commenced, who became so bold that in 1811 they advanced to Nagpur and burnt the suburbs. It was at this time that most of the numerous village forts were built; on the approach of these marauders the peasantry retired to the forts and fought for bare life, all they possessed outside the walls being already lost to them.

==== Mudhoji II Bhonsle (1817–1818) ====
On the death of Raghoji II in 1816, his son Parsoji was supplanted by Mudhoji II Bhonsle, also known as Appa Sahib, son of Vyankoji, brother of Raghoji II, in 1817. A treaty of alliance providing for the maintenance of a subsidiary force by the British was signed in this year, a British resident having been appointed to the Nagpur court since 1799. In 1817, on the outbreak of war between the British and the Peshwa, Appa Sahib threw off his cloak of friendship, and accepted an embassy and a title from the Peshwa. His troops attacked the British, and were defeated in the action at Sitabuldi, and a second time close to Nagpur city. As a result of these battles the remaining portion of Berar and the territories in the Narmada valley were ceded to the British. Appa Sahib was reinstated to the throne, but shortly afterwards was discovered to be again conspiring, and was deposed and sent to Allahabad in custody. On the way, however, he bribed his guards and escaped, first to the Mahadeo Hills, subsequently to the Punjab and finally took asylum in the court of Man Singh of Jodhpur. Man Singh gave him refuge against the wishes of British.

==== Raghoji III Bhonsle (1818–1853) ====
A grandchild of Raghoji II was then placed on the throne, and the territories were administered by the resident from 1818 to 1830, in which year the young ruler known as Raghoji III was allowed to assume the actual government. He died without a male heir in 1853, and the kingdom was annexed by the British under the doctrine of lapse. After Raghoji's ill-health and death the reins of the kingdom were handed over to his cousin Tukaramji Mehere who was a Maratha land administrator and landlord in belt who managed large portions of land from Nagpur to Akola until India got the independence in 1947

==== Aftermath ====
The former kingdom was administered as Nagpur Province, under a commissioner appointed by the Governor-General of India, until the formation of the Central Provinces in 1861. During the revolt of 1857 a scheme for an uprising was formed by a regiment of irregular cavalry in conjunction with the disaffected Muslims of the city, but was frustrated by the prompt action of the civil authorities, supported by Madras troops from Kamptee. Some of the native officers and two of the leading Muslims of the city were hanged from the ramparts of the fort, and the disturbances ended. The aged princess Baka Bai, widow of Raghoji II, used all her influence in support of the British, and by her example kept the Maratha districts loyal.

== Rajas of Nagpur ==
Raja of Nagpur
- Flag

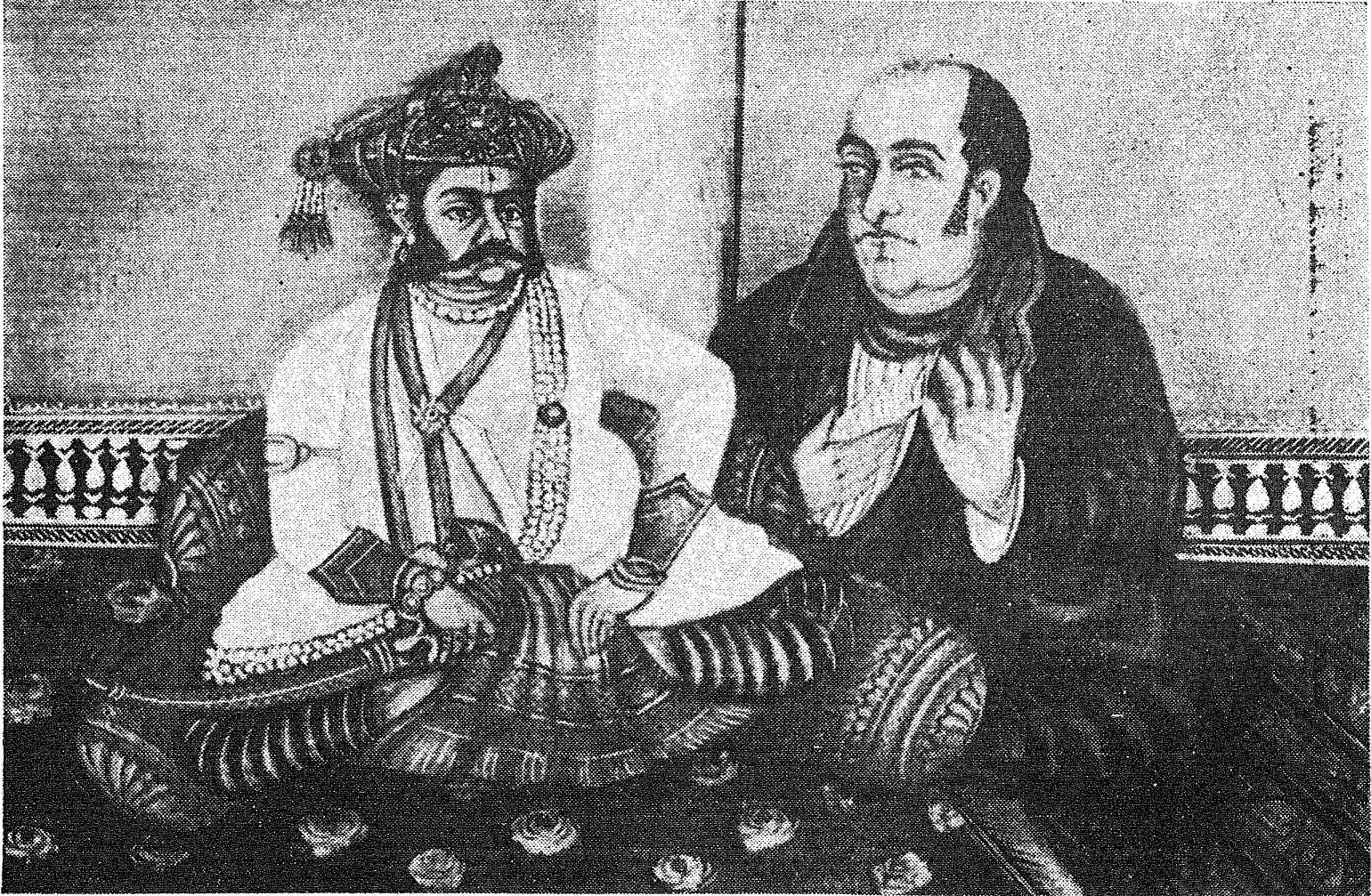
- Last to reign Raghuji III; 26 June 1818 – 11 December 1853

Details
- Style: His Majesty
- First monarch: Raghuji I
- Last monarch: Raghuji III
- Formed: 1739
- Abolished: 11 December 1853

- Raghoji I (1739 – 14 Feb 1755)
- Janoji (1755 – 21 May 1772)
- Mudhoji (1772 – 19 May 1788)
- Raghoji II (1788 – 22 Mar 1816)
- Parsoji (1816 – 2 Feb 1817) (b. 1778 – d. 1817)
- Mudhoji II "Appa Sahib" (1817 – 15 Mar 1818) (b. 1796 – d. 1840)
- Raghuji III (1818 – 11 Dec 1853) (b. 1808 – d. 1853)

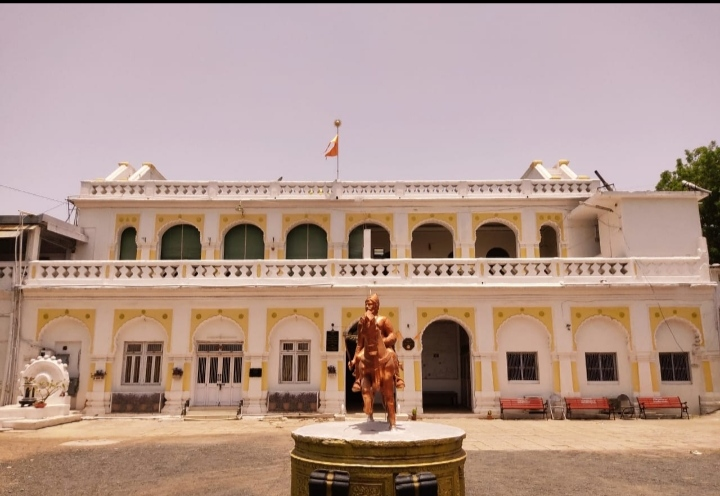
Senior Bhonsle palace

== Family tree ==
Family tree of Maratha Rajas and later Maharajas of Nagpur

Raghoji I the Great^{(1)} r. 1739-1755
Janoji^{(2)} r. 1755-1772	Mudhoji I^{(3)} r. 1772-1788
Raghoji II^{(4)} r. 1788-1816	Vyankoji
Parsoji^{(5)} r. 1816-1817	Banubai	Mudhoji II; Appa Sahib^{(6)} r. 1817-1818
Raghoji III^{(7)} r. 1818-1853
Tukramji Mehere^{(7)} r. 1854-1920
Bhikaji Mehere^{(7)} r. 1921-1955

== Army ==
Though Marathas constituted 30% of the total army, they deployed families across the region that were the main task force in the expansion of Maratha Empire in Gondwana and Northern region. As a part of that, the Bhonsles raised two infantry brigades with modern military training, however without guidance of European officers. They extensively employed Pindaris and silently supported them like the Holkars of Indore and Scindias of Gwalior. Light cavalry mercenaries called Bargi were employed by the Bhonsles during the brutal Maratha invasions of Bengal. The Bargi mercenaries led by the general Bhaskar Pandit into Bengal caused so much destruction that lullabies were composed in which mothers would use the fear of a Maratha raid to get their children to go to sleep. These poems are popular amongst Bengalis even today, one traditional song translated is as follows, When the children fall asleep, silence sets in, the Bargis come to our lands. Bulbuls have eaten the grains, how shall I pay the nawab's tax demands.

=== Artillery ===
Mahadaji Shinde, a distinguished Maratha general from the Shinde royal clan, focused his attention on European artillery and secured the services of the noted Frenchman Benoît de Boigne who had received training from the best of the European military schools. Following suit, the Bhosales and other Maratha chiefs also raised French-trained artillery battalions.

== See also ==
- Bhonsle
- Maratha (caste)
- Maratha Confederacy
- List of Maratha dynasties and states
- List of princely states of British India (by region)
- Nagpur
- Nagpur district
- Nagpur division
