= Battle of Pachgaon =

1775 battle

Coordinates: 28.314357°N 76.898037°E

| Date | 26 January 1775 |
| Location | Pachgaon, Maharashtra, India |
| Result | Victory for Mudhoji Bhonsle |

Belligerents
| Sabaji Bhonsle | Mudhoji Bhonsle |

Commanders and leaders
| Sabaji Bhonsle † | Mudhoji Bhonsle Muhammad Yusuf Gardi |

Casualties and losses
| Unknown | Unknown |

The Battle of Pachgaon was fought on 26 January 1775 for accession to the throne of the Nagpur Kingdom in central India. Mudhoji Bhonsle killed his brother and rival Sabaji, securing the undisputed regency for Mudhoji's infant son Raghoji II. The battle ended a struggle begun when their brother, the ruler Janoji Bhonsle, died in 1772 after adopting Raghoji II as his heir.

The battle occurred six miles south of Nagpur in modern-day Maharashtra, India. The fortune of the day had declared for Sabaji, and Mudhoji was surrounded by his brother's troops. Flushed with the fight and his apparent victory, Sabaji drove his elephant against his brother's, and called on him to surrender. Mudhoji replied with a pistol shot, killing Sadhoji and gaining the undisputed regency on behalf of his infant son Raghoji II, Janoji's adopted heir, and the title of Sena Dhurandhar.

Muhammad Yusuf Gardi, a chief assassin of the Peshwa Narayanrao in 1773, fought for Mudhoji.
