= Mudhoji II of Nagpur =

King of Nagpur from 1816 to 1818

Mudhoji II
- Maharaja of Nagpur
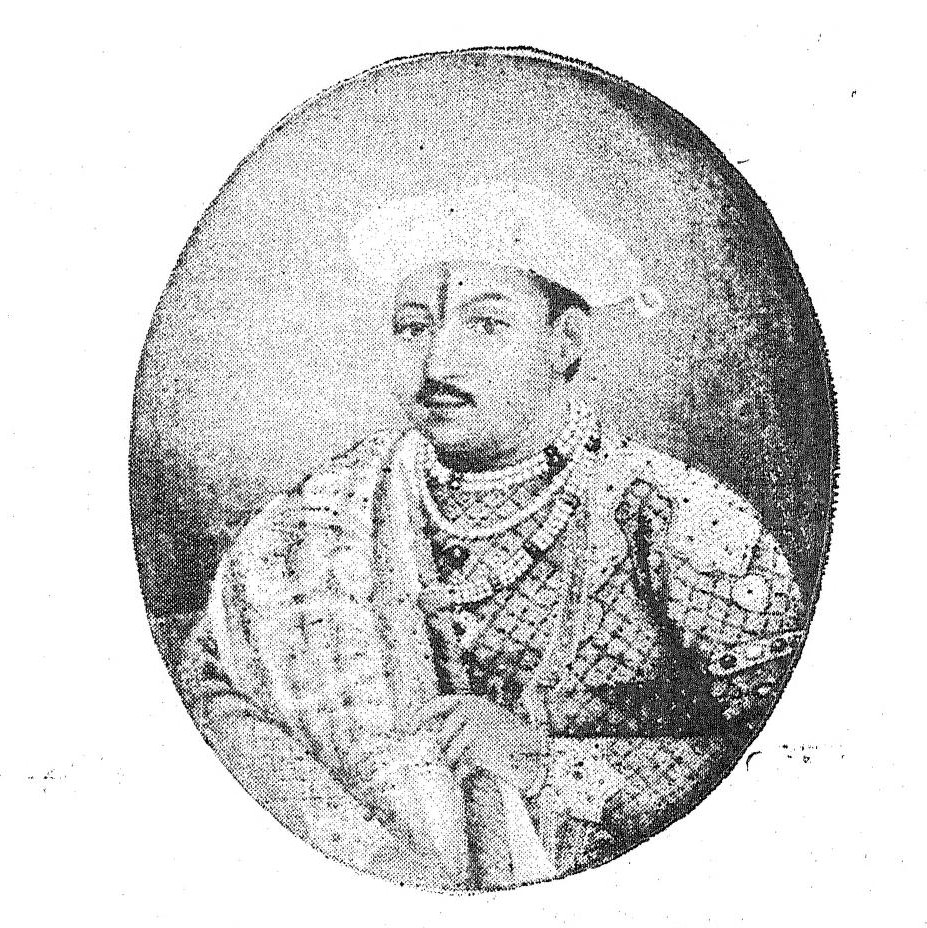
- 1934 illustration of Appa Sahib by Yadav Madhav Kale

6th Raja of Nagpur
- Reign: 1816 – 9 January 1818
- Predecessor: Parsoji
- Successor: Raghuji III
- Born: 1796
- Died: 15 July 1840 (aged 43–44); Jodhpur
- House: Bhonsles of Nagpur
- Religion: Hinduism

Mudhoji II (1796 – 15 July 1840), also known as Appa Sahib, of the Bhonsale dynasty, ruled the Kingdom of Nagpur in central India from 1816 to 1818. His reign coincided with the Third Anglo-Maratha War between the Maratha Empire and the British East India Company, which ended with the defeat of the Marathas.

== Biography ==
On the death of Raghoji II Bhonsale in 1816, his son Parsaji was soon supplanted and murdered by Mudhoji II. A treaty of alliance providing for the maintenance of a subsidiary force by the British was signed in this year, a British resident having been appointed to the Nagpur court since 1799. In 1817, on the outbreak of war between the British and the Peshwa, Appa Sahib threw off his cloak of friendship, and accepted an embassy and title from the Peshwa. His troops attacked the British, and were defeated in the action at Sitabaldi, and a second time round Nagpur city. As a result of these battles, the remaining portion of Berar and the territories in the Narmada valley were ceded to the British. Appa Sahib was reinstated to the throne, but shortly afterwards was discovered to be again conspiring, and was deposed and forwarded to Allahabad in custody, while the British placed his successor Raghoji III Bhonsale, a minor, on the Nagpur throne. On the way, however, he bribed his guards and escaped, first to the Mahadeo Hills and subsequently to the Punjab. Raja Mansingh of Jodhpur gave him asylum at Man Mandir in Jodhpur against the wishes of British. When British sent forces against Man Singh, he stood surety for Appa Saheb. Appa Saheb remained in Jodhpur, where he died on 15 July 1840 at 44 years while in exile.

| Preceded by Parasoji Bhonsle | King of Nagpur; 1816–1818 | Succeeded by Raghuji III |
