= Mudhoji I =

Raja of Nagpur from 1772 to 1788

- Sardar; Senadhurandhar Sarkar; King of Chandrapur
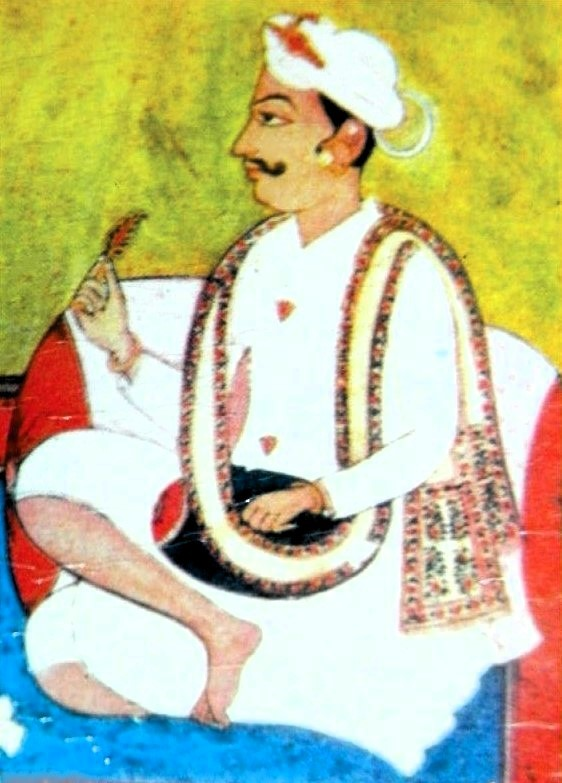
- Mudhoji Raghuji Bhonsle

3rd Raja of Nagpur
- Reign: 21 May 1772 – 18 May 1788
- Predecessor: Janoji
- Successor: Raghoji II
- Born: Nagpur, Nagpur State, Maratha Confederacy (modern day Maharashtra, India)
- Died: 18 May 1788; Nagpur, Nagpur State, Maratha Confederacy
- Issue: Raghoji II, Chimnaji, Vyankoji
- House: Bhonsles of Nagpur
- Father: Raghoji I
- Mother: Sulā Bai Mohite
- Religion: Hinduism

Mudhoji I (Mudhoji Bhonsle; reigned 21 May 1772 – 18 May 1788) was the ruler of the Nagpur kingdom from 1772 to 1788. During his regency the Maratha kingdom remained peaceful and prospered.

== Early life ==
Mudhoji was a son of Raghoji I, a powerful Maratha leader and founder of Maratha rule in Nagpur, and Sulā Bai Mohite, the younger sister of Burhanji Mohite who was an influential courtier at Nagpur. His elder brother was Janoji Bhonsle, younger brothers were Bimbaji Bhonsle and Sabaji Bhonsle.

In 1743, Sagunbai, the youngest queen of Shahu I (Mudhoji's aunt through his mother's side), proposed that Mudhoji be made the next Chhatrapati of the Maratha Empire after Shahu I's death. However, the idea was abandoned due to fierce opposition by Sawkarbai, another queen of Shahu.

Mudhoji had initially opposed his brother Janoji Bhonsle's accession to the throne of Nagpur. He deserted Janoji when Peshwa Madhavrao I attacked Nagpur in 1768 (on account of Janoji supporting Madhavrao I, went to Madhavrao I's camp and unconditionally surrendered.

== Reign ==
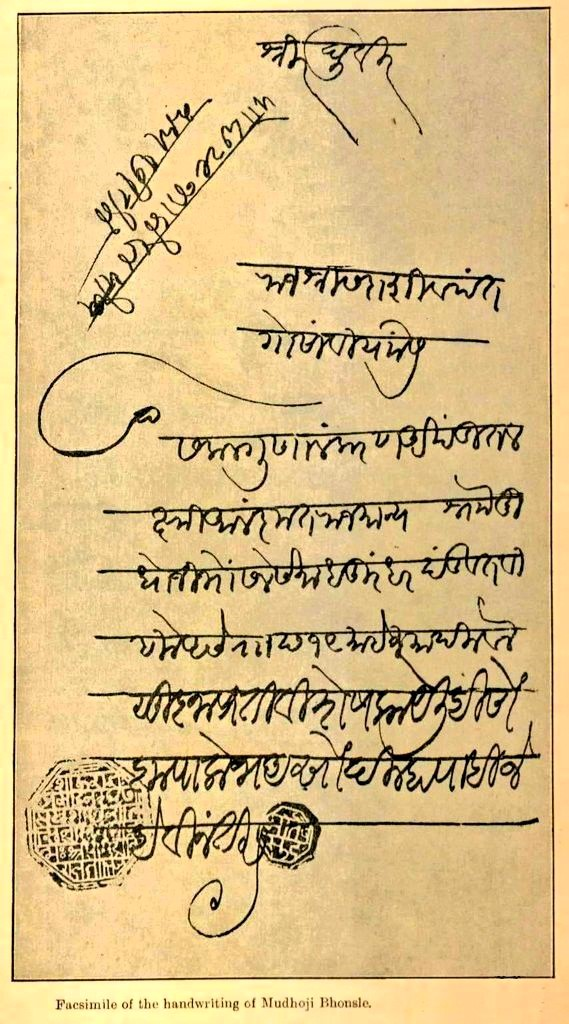
Seal and Handwriting of Mudhoji Bhonsle I

Mudhoji's elder brother Janoji Bhonsle had appointed Mudhoji's infant son Raghoji II as ruler of Nagpur Kingdom before his death.

Between 1772 and 1775 a civil war ensued between Sabaji Bhonsle and his brother Mudhoji Bhonsle for the regency of Mudhoji's infant son Raghoji II Bhonsle, culminating in the Battle of Pachgaon. Mudhoji appeared victor and secured the regency of the Nagpur Kingdom for himself.

Mudhoji immediately started restoring order in the kingdom, governing wisely. In the year 1777 he cautiously entered into agreements with the English, who were then preparing to support the claims of the upstart Raghunath Rao as Peshwa.

In 1778, Mudhoji came to Poona to reconcile with Nana Phadnavis, a powerful Maratha statesman who was disappointed with Mudhoji for supporting the British cause in the First Anglo-Maratha War. Nana Phadnavis convinced Mudhoji to join an alliance against Tipu Sultan on his stay in Poona. Mudhoji contributed 10,000 troops to the cause of the coalition but left after the successful siege of Badami in May 1786, leaving a major portion of his troops with Hari Pant.

In 1785, he nominally added Mandla and the Upper Narmada Valley to the Nagpur Kingdom through a deal with the Peshwa, paying twenty-seven lakh rupees to the Poona government.

== Death ==
Mudhoji died of an illness on 18 May 1788. The Nagpur District Gazetteer states that he left behind a peaceful and prosperous kingdom at his death.

After his death, his son, the now mature Raghoji II Bhonsle assumed control of the government.
