= Raghuji III =

Raja of Nagpur from 1818 to 1853

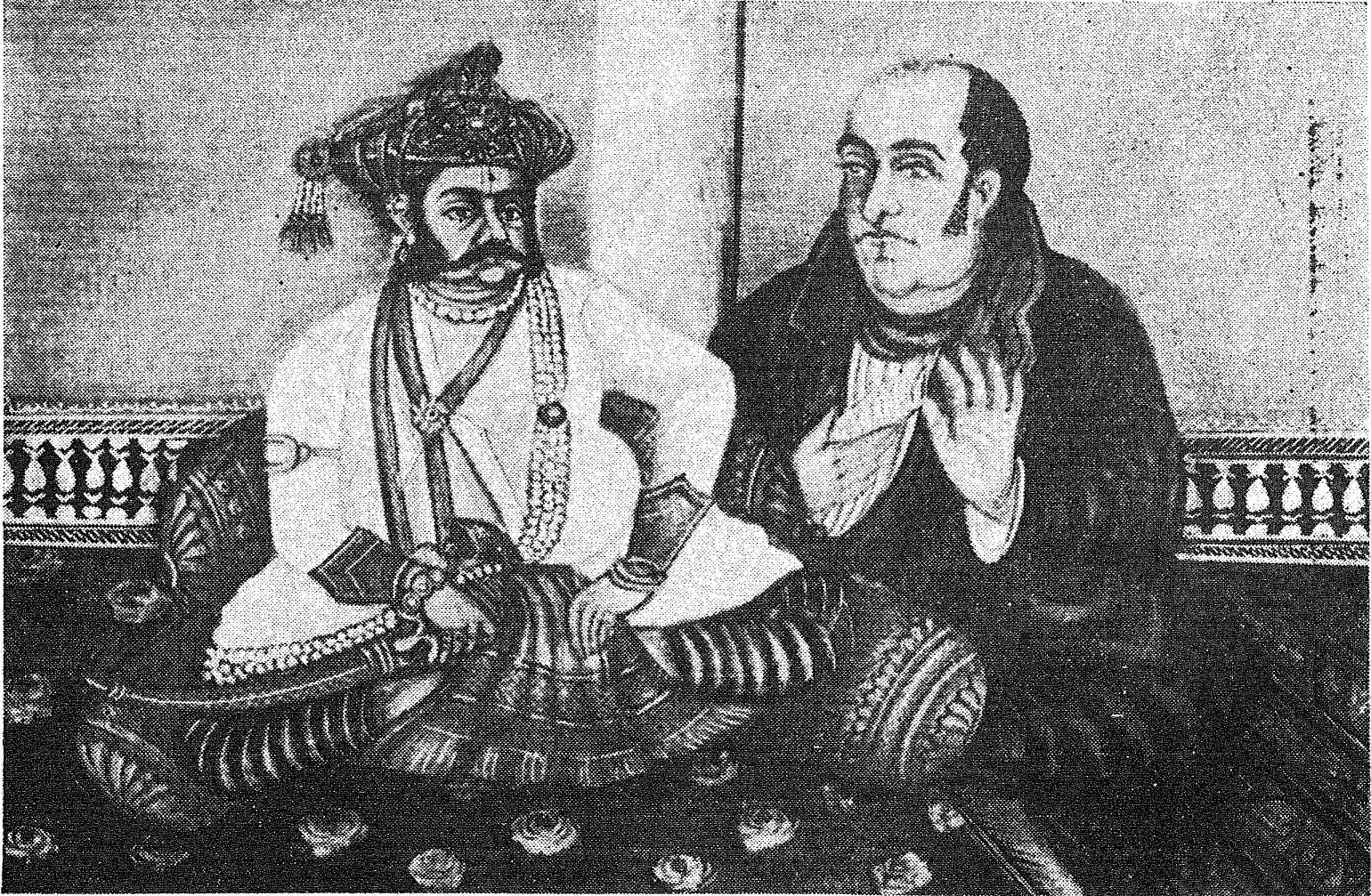
- Raghuji Bhonsle III

7th Raja of Nagpur
- Reign: 26 June 1818 – 11 December 1853
- Coronation: 26 June 1818
- Predecessor: Mudhoji II
- Successor: Position abolished (annexed by the East India Company as Nagpur Province)
- Born: 1806 or 1808
- Died: 11 December 1853; Nagpur
- Spouse: 8 wives
- House: Bhonsles of Nagpur
- Religion: Hinduism

Raghuji III (1806 or 1808 – 11 December 1853) or Raghuji, was the Maratha ruler of the Principal States of Nagpur in Central India from 1818 to 1853.

== Life ==
=== Succession ===
When Appa Sahib was arrested, the Resident Richard Jenkins decided to adopt Bajiba, the son of Banubai, as the successor to the Bhonsle gadi. Banubai was the daughter of Raghuji II. The adoption ceremony was performed on 26 June 1818 and Bajiba was renamed Raghuji III.

He was then only ten years old. It was the Resident who took the entire administration into his own hands during the minority of Raghuji III. Bakabai, the widow of Raghoji II Bhonsle was to look after the palace affairs. Her ambition to rule may be said to have been fulfilled at least partly. Prior to his retirement the Resident held a grand darbar and read out the terms of the treaty with Raghuji III on 1 December 1826. It was ratified by the Governor General on 13 December 1826.

=== Culture and pilgrimage ===
Jenkins took care to educate Raghuji III. Raghuji was initially taught reading, writing and arithmetic and had received working knowledge of Persian and Marathi, though he had no inclination for learning. In the early part of his royal career Raghuji took keen interest in administrative matters but later neglected them.

He was interested music and dancing and later indulged in gambling to the neglect of his duties. He was addicted to drinking and during his last illness he drank desperately. Apart from these personal vices Raghuji was on the whole a just and good administrator, being popular among his subjects.

In 1838, Raghuji had been to Kasi, Gaya and other holy places on a pilgrimage. He was accompanied by Captain Fitzgerald with his Madras contingent.

=== Death ===
Raghuji was not blessed by progeny though he had in all eight wives. He had one son who died in infancy after whom he probably did not get any issue. He does not seem to have cared for his successor. He probably considered his being without a son as a blemish and left the question of succession to its own fate.

This, however, proved to be detrimental to the royal family Bhonsle as is corroborated by facts. Raghuji was not on good terms with the last British Resident Charles Grenville Mansel. This might have adversely affected the succession question.

Raghuji died at the age of 47 after a long illness of 25 days on 11 December 1853. His obsequies were performed by his nephew Nana Ahirarav and it was decided to adopt his son Yasavantrav as the next successor.
