= Deur =

Village in Maharashtra

- village
- Location in Maharashtra, India Deur (India)
- Coordinates: 20.0006603°N 72.9135734°E
- Country: India
- State: Maharashtra
- District: Palghar
- Taluka: Dahanu
- Elevation: 105 m (344 ft)

Population (2011)
  - Total: 1,114
- Time zone: UTC+5:30 (IST)
- 2011 census code: 551675

Deur is a village in the Palghar district of Maharashtra, India. It is located in the Dahanu taluka.

== Demographics ==
According to the 2011 census of India, Deur has 214 households. The effective literacy rate (i.e. the literacy rate of population excluding children aged 6 and below) is 35.21%.

Demographics (2011 Census)
	Total	Male	Female
Population	1114	546	568
Children aged below 6 years	174	93	81
Scheduled caste	0	0	0
Scheduled tribe	1112	544	568
Literates	331	240	91
Workers (all)	623	311	312
Main workers (total)	606	302	304
Main workers: Cultivators	385	190	195
Main workers: Agricultural labourers	170	83	87
Main workers: Household industry workers	3	2	1
Main workers: Other	48	27	21
Marginal workers (total)	17	9	8
Marginal workers: Cultivators	0	0	0
Marginal workers: Agricultural labourers	13	6	7
Marginal workers: Household industry workers	0	0	0
Marginal workers: Others	4	3	1
Non-workers	491	235	256
