= Pachgaon =

- Suburb
- Location in Maharashtra, India
- Coordinates: 16.660°N 74.227°E
- Country: India
- State: Maharashtra
- District: Kolhapur

Population (2001)
  - Total: 11,913

Languages
  - Official: Marathi
- Time zone: UTC+5:30 (IST)

Pachgaon is a census town in Kolhapur district in the Indian state of Maharashtra.

== Demographics ==
As of 2001 India census, Pachgaon had a population of 11,913. Males constitute 53% of the population and females 47%. Pachgaon has an average literacy rate of 78%, higher than the national average of 59.5%: male literacy is 82%, and female literacy is 74%. In Pachgaon, 12% of the population is under 6 years of age.

== See also ==
- Pachgaon (Manesar)
