= Sitabuldi Fort =

Fort in Nagpur, Maharashtra, India

- Nagpur, Maharashtra
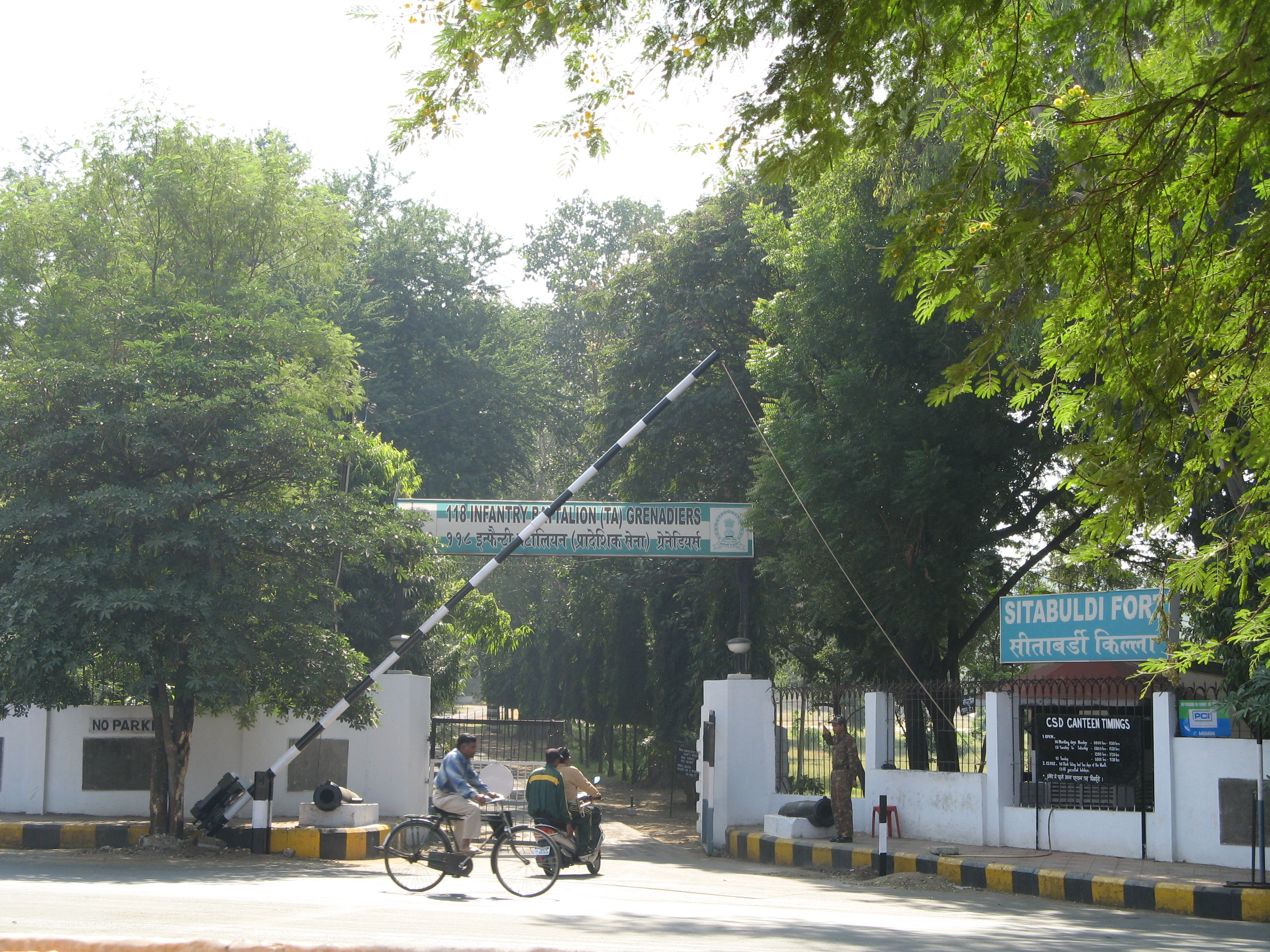
- Entrance to the Sitabuldi fort

Site information
- Type: Land fort
- Owner: Army of India
- Open to the public: 26 January, 1 May (Maharashtra Day), and 15 August

Location
- Coordinates: 21°8′54″N 79°5′6″E

Site history
- Built by: British East Company (started construction)
- Materials: Sandstone & Black Basalt
- Battles/wars: Battle of Sitabuldi

Garrison information
- Garrison: Indian Army's 118th infantry battalion

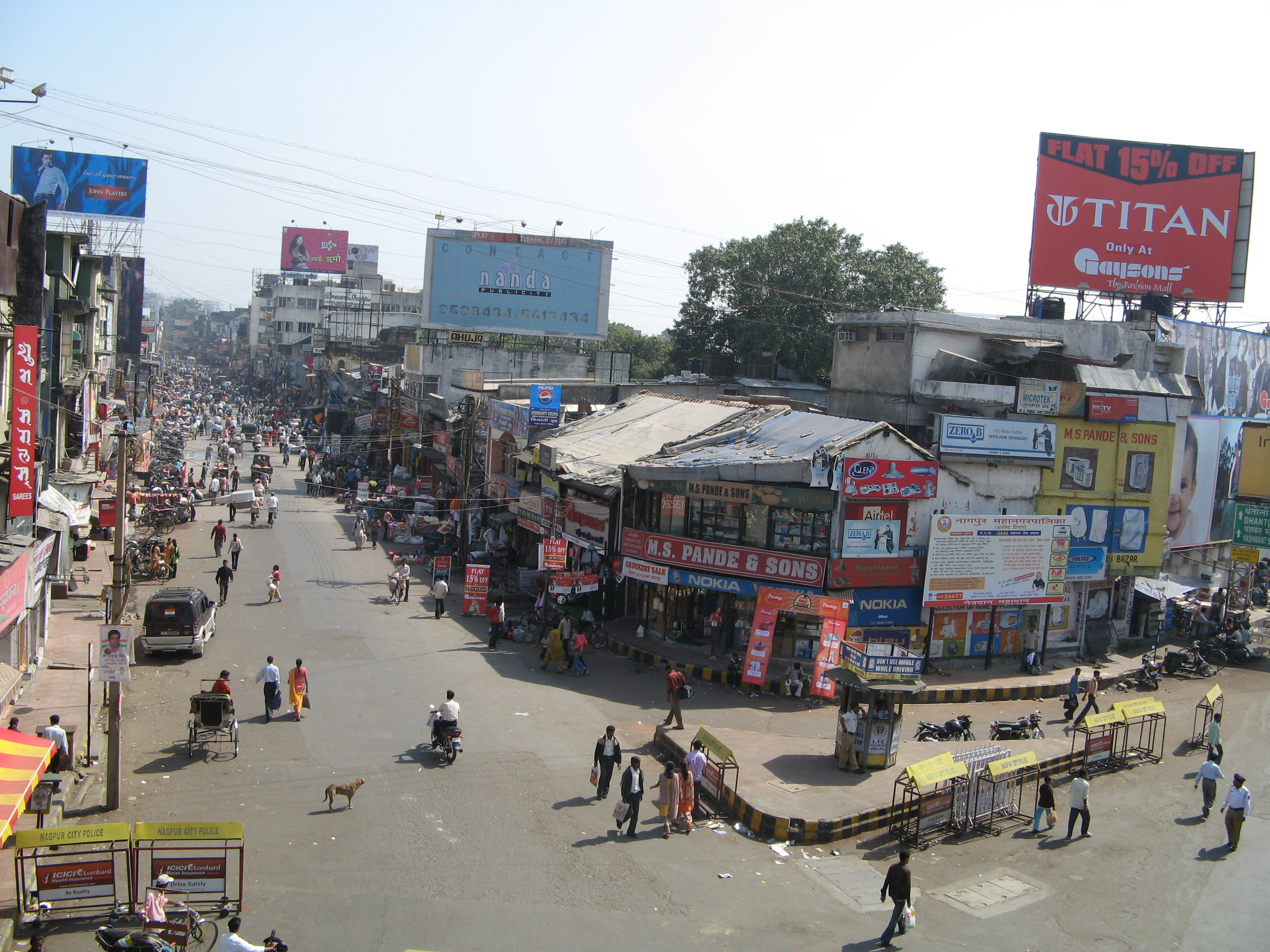
Sitabuldi market street, one of Nagpur's commercial areas

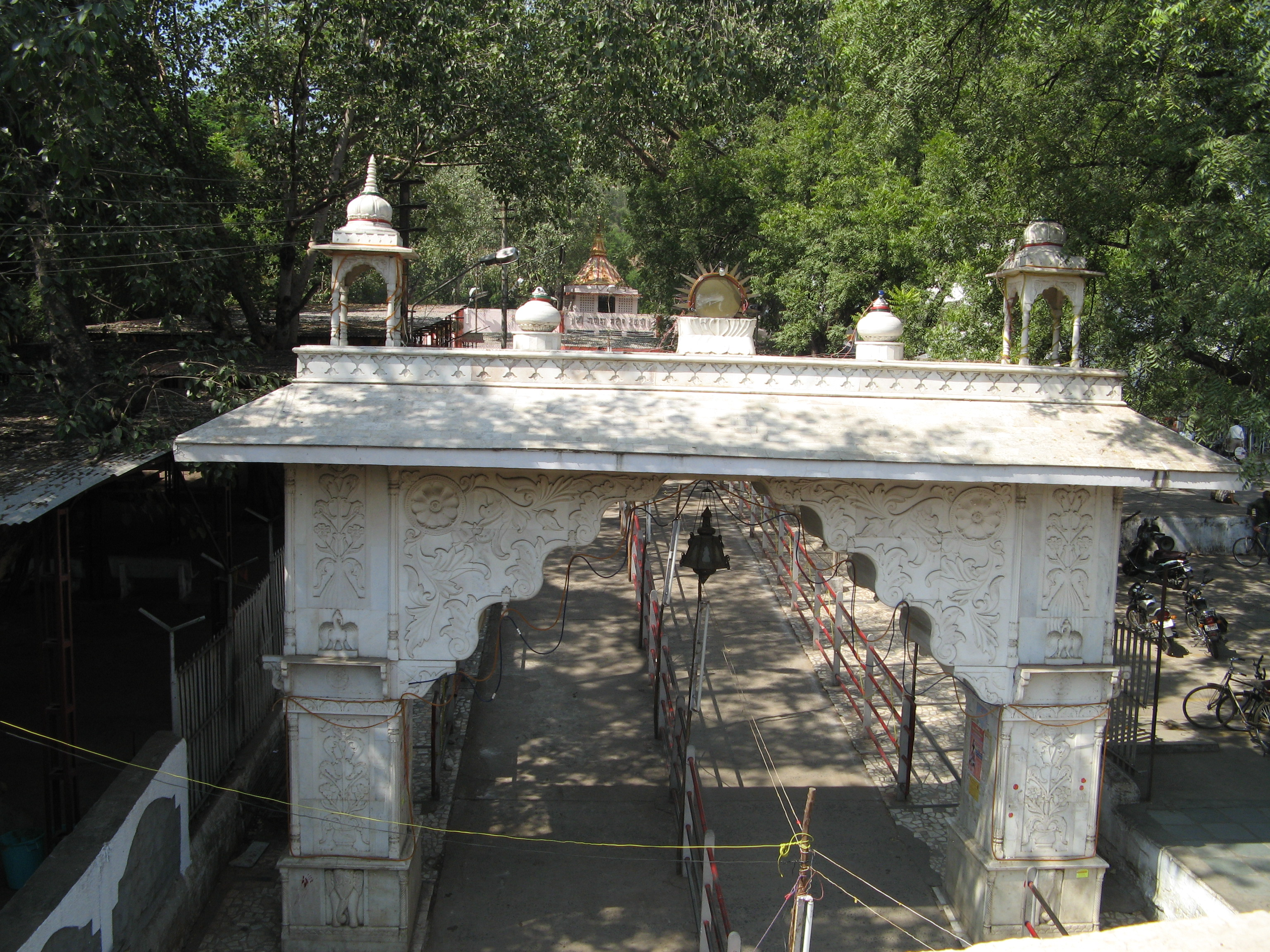
Entrance gate of Tekdi Ganesh temple

Sitabuldi Fort, site of the Battle of Sitabuldi in 1817, is located atop a hillock in central Nagpur, in the Indian state of Maharashtra. The fort was built by the British after they won this area. Mudhoji II Senasaheb Subha was allowed to continue ruling Nagpur after the British had won the battles of Sitaburdi, Sakkardara, and Nagpur. Richard Jenkins entered into a treaty with Mudhoji on 6 January 1818, which was later ratified by the Governor General. Article 7 of the treaty stated: "The two hills of Seetabuldee with the bazaars and land adjoining, to a distance to be hereafter specified, shall be henceforth included in the British boundary, and such Military works erected as may be deemed necessary." By this treaty, the British occupied the Sitaburdi hills and large areas on all four sides. However no major construction work was erected on it for next two years. The area surrounding the hillock, now known as Sitabuldi, is an important commercial hub for Nagpur. To the south is Nagpur Railway Station and behind it is Tekdi Ganapati, a temple of Ganesha. The fort was a home to the Indian Army's 118th infantry battalion (Territorial Army) Grenadiers till 2019.

== Battle of Sitabuldi ==
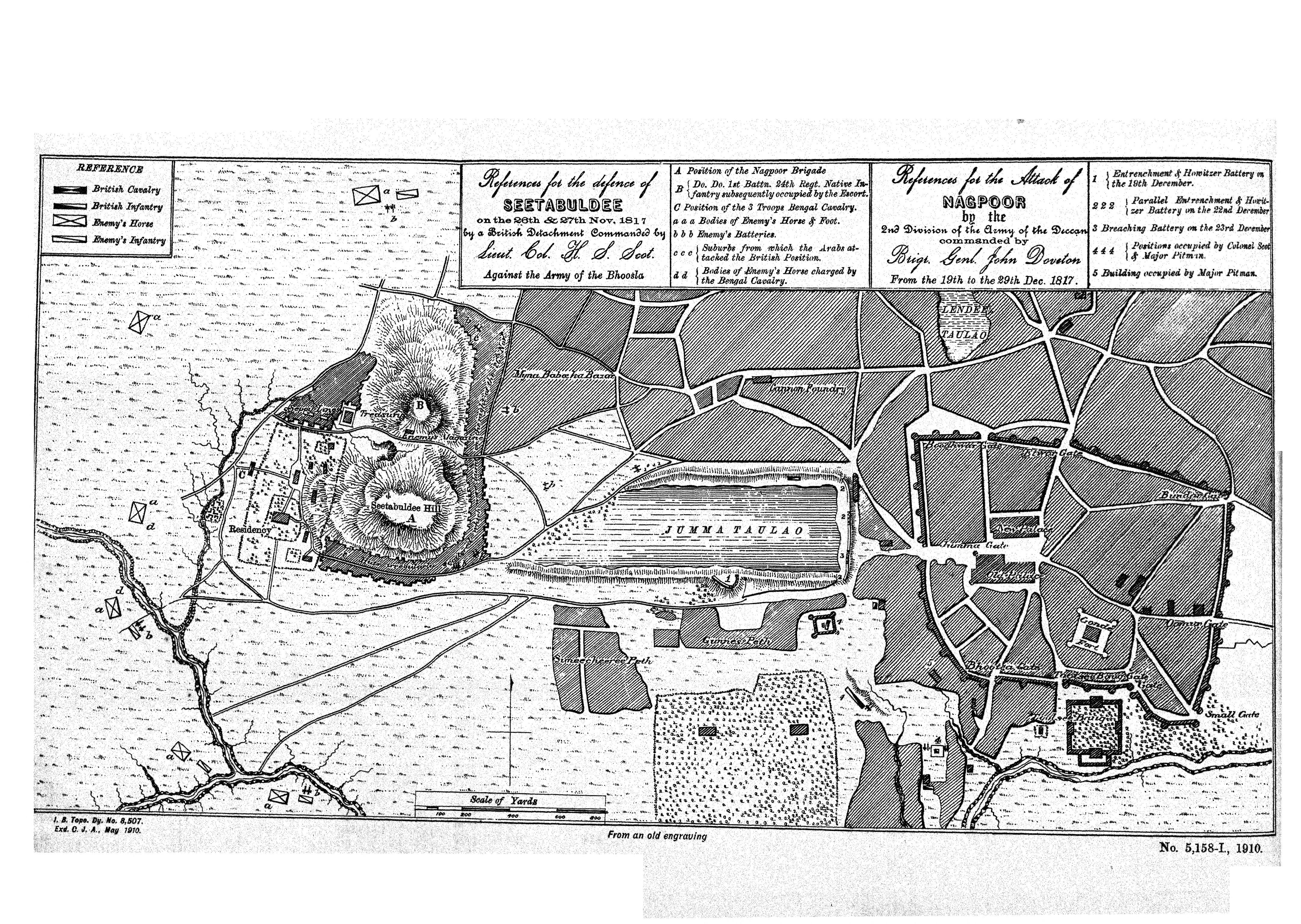
Plan of the defence of Sitabuldi and attack of Nagpur, 1817

Sitabuldi Fort, a major tourist attraction in Nagpur, is situated on two hillocks: Mothi Tekdi, literally meaning 'big hill', and Choti Tekdi, meaning 'small hill' in Marathi. The Sitabuldi hills, though then barren and rocky, were not entirely unoccupied. Tradition holds that Sitabuldi got its name from two Yadava brothers – Shitlaprasad and Badriprasad Gawali, who ruled the area in the 17th century. The place came to be known as "Shitlabadri", which during British rule became "Seetabuldee", and later assumed its current form, "Sitabardi" or "Sitabuldi". Another theory suggests that The name “Sitabuldi” is believed to have originated from the Marathi words ‘Sita’ (meaning grain) and ‘Buldi’ (meaning a small fort or mound), as the area was once used to store grain during the Maratha rule. The Battle of Sitabuldi was fought in November 1817 on these hillocks between the forces of Appa Saheb Bhonsle of Nagpur and the British.

After the death of Shivaji Maharaj on 3 April 1680, the Marathas continued the battle with Mughals (Aurangzeb), Sambhaji, Rajaram and then the Shahu (son of Sambhaji). the Maratha Empire was under the governance of the Peshwas of Pune under the Flagship of Chatrapati Shahu, who had appointed the Gaekwads of Baroda, the Holkars of Indore, the Scindias of Gwalior, while the Bhonsles of Nagpur were an independent Sansthan. The Maratha confederacy, as the five families were known, was still a formidable force.

During the 18th and 19th centuries, the Marathas tried to overcome the gradual supremacy of the East India Company, while the British prepared to suppress the Marathas. At the beginning of the 19th century, during the Second Anglo-Maratha War, the victorious British annexed territories of the Marathas.

Mudhoji II Bhonsle, also known as Appa Sahib, ascended the throne of Nagpur in 1816. On 23 November 1817, he told the British resident that he intended to receive a Khilat sent to him by the Peshwa which would make him Senapati of the Marathas. The British Resident, Jenkins, "did not like this idea and the growing contact between Mudhoji and Baji Rao," but Appa Saheb ignored him and proceeded with the ceremony.

On 24 November 1817, Appa Sahib publicly received the Khilat and accepted the commission appointing him Senapati of the Maratha armies. He then mounted his elephant and addressed his principal Sardars. Surrounded by his troops, he proceeded to the camp at Sukhardara. The royal standard was displayed, the army was drawn up, salutes fired from artillery stations, and nothing was omitted which could add to the pomp of the ceremony.

On the morning of 25 November 1817, communication between the residency and the city was prohibited. The resident Harakars were refused permission to carry a letter to the darbar and the markets were closed to English troops. The resident decided to delay taking any decisive measures. Towards noon of 25 November, a group of 2,000 Bhosla cavalry left their camp at Bokur, five miles north-east of the city, and approached the residency. The alarm had now spread to the market frequented by the people of the residency, which soon became almost deserted. All classes, both rich and poor, removed their families and property from the vicinity of Sitabuldi.

The resident now knew that an attack on the residency was imminent. He sent orders to Lieutenant Colonel Scott at about 2:00 pm to march immediately from his cantonment at Telankheri. The force arrived near the residency and occupied the twin hills of Sitabuldi. This movement was executed only just in time, as a large group of Arabs, hired as mercenaries by the Maratha army, were awaiting final orders to secure this position. A message was also sent to General Doveton to come immediately with the Second Division of the Army from Berar.

=== Battleground ===
The high ground of Sitabuldi is rocky and devoid of trees, so it was not possible to dig any entrenchments on the two hills in the available time. Choti Tekri, the northernmost of the two hillocks, is lower in height, but was within musket range of Badi Tekri, so securing that ground was considered essential. The suburbs of the city came close to Choti Tekri.

- British forces
- A brigade of two Battalions of 20 and 24 Madras Native Infantry
- Two companies of Native Infantry
- Three troops of Bengal Native Cavalry
- Four six-pounder guns marines by Europeans of the Madras Artillery
- Resident Escorts (British Imperial Army)
- Disposition of British troops, 26 November 1817
- Chotti Tekri: 24 Battalion Madras Native Infantry with one 6-pounder gun
- Badi Tekri: 20 Battalion Madras Native Infantry with two 6-pounder guns
- Residency: Resident escorts, three troops of Bangal Native Cavalry, two infantry companies, and one 6-pounder gun
- Marathas forces
- Infantry: About 18,000 troops
- Cavalry: 2000 Maratha Cavalry
- Artillery: 26 or 36 guns

=== Battle ===
Badi Tekri was occupied by about 800 men under Lieutenant Colonel Scott. About 300 men of the 24th Regiment under Captain Saddle were posted on Choti Tekri with one 6-pounder gun. On the other side of the hill, the suburbs gave cover to the Maratha troops, especially the Arabs, who throughout the day on 26 November were gathering in large numbers. The Arabs began the battle in the evening by opening fire on Choti Tekri. The engagement lasted until the early hours of the morning, when it slackened somewhat. Several times during the night the Arabs tried to capture the hill. Although they were repulsed, they inflicted heavy casualties. Captain Saddle was shot and killed. As the ranks of 24th Regiment were thinned, reinforcements were sent down from the 20th Regiment, who were occupying the upper hill. At dawn on 27 November, the British troops were still holding on in an isolated position. At 5:00 am, the few remaining men of the 24th Regiment, being utterly exhausted, were withdrawn. Their place was taken by the Residents Escorts, with orders to confine their defence to the summit of the lower hill. The fight continued until 9:00 the next morning, when the Arabs charged and captured the hill. They turned the captured gun against the higher hill position.

The Maratha Cavalry and Infantry closed in from all sides and prepared for a general assault. The Arabs broke into the huts of the English troops and ransacked them. Some Maratha cavalry entered the residency compound. Captain Fitzgerald, in command of three troops of Bengal Cavalry and some horsemen of the resident escorts, had been requesting permission to charge, but his request was repeatedly turned down. Seeing the impending destruction, he made a last request. "Tell him to charge at his peril", Colonel Scott replied. "At my peril be it", said Captain Fitzgerald. He and his troops then charged some of the enemy cavalry, killed some of their supporting infantry, and captured their two guns. When the infantry posted on the hill witnessed this exploit, they became freshly animated. Just then an explosion of ammunition took place amongst the Arabs on the lower hill. The British troops rushed forward and pursued the Arabs down the hill, took two of their guns, and returned to their position. The Arabs rallied with the intention of attempting to recover the lost ground. As they were getting ready to come up, a troop of cavalry under Colonel Smith charged around the base of the hill, attacked the Arabs in the flank, and dispersed them. The British troops now advanced from the hill drove the infantry from the adjoining hills, and by noon the conflict was over. The British lost 367 killed and wounded, including 16 officers.

== During the British Raj ==
The Nagpur Subsidiary Force was cantoned at Sitaburdi. Large flat areaat north side of Sitaburdi hills was leveled and an arsenal for artillery and armament was built. Other units were quartered still north of it in what now called a Chhaoni area. Large areas were marked for tent lines, parade, bazaar, hospital and stables for cavalry.

It was decided to build up a large arsenal as Nagpur was ideal place under British control south of Narmada. It would serve to all armies south and around Narmada. The central part of India was not surveyed in detail by then and only known good roads connected Nagpur to all direction. It was decided to establish another large cantonment on banks of river Kanhan near the village Kamathi. The huts which were present before the battle of Sitaburdi on the east of the hill were burned down on the night of 26 November 1817. Reconstruction was not allowed. The houses in the Mainabai's peth had afforded protection to the attacker Arabs. Hence it was decided to clear that area of all structures so that any attack from that direction would be exposed to fire from the hill fort. The whole area was cleared. Raghuji III, the adopted son of Durgabai widow of Parsoji, died on 11 December 1853 at about 6am after an illness lasting one month. 47 minute guns were fired from Sitaburdi fort equal to his age in years.

British soldiers who died in the battle of Sitabuldi were buried in graves in the fort.

Tipu Sultan's grandson, Nawab Kadar Ali, and his eight associates were hanged by the ramparts of the fort for their role in the 1857 rebellion against the British, and buried in a common pit inside the fort.

Mahatma Gandhi is said to have been imprisoned in the fort from 10 April to 15 May 1923, this however, is not true as Gandhi was in Yerwada during this period. King George V and Queen Mary of the United Kingdom gave audience to the people of Nagpur from the fort during their visit to British India. A pillar to commemorate the event stands in the fort. The royals were greeted by a huge crowd gathered at the area towards the present Nagpur Railway Station.

== Current status ==
In 2019 118 TA Battalion stationed here was moved to Bhusawal to make place for Uttar Maharashtra and Gujarat (UMANG) Sub-Area Headquarters of the Indian Army. UMANG Sub-Area Headquarters had shifted from Mumbai to Nagpur in 2018. Since then, it was stationed in Command Works Engineer (CWS) office. The CWS unit was shifted to Sitabuldi Fort where 118 TA Battalion was earlier located.

== See also ==
- List of forts in Maharashtra
