= Bhonsles of Nagpur =

Maratha royal house that ruled the Nagpur Kingdom

- State flag
- Parent house: House of Bhonsle
- Country: Kingdom of Nagpur
- Founded: 1739
- Founder: Raghoji I
- Current head: Raghuji V
- Final ruler: Raghuji III
- Titles: Sena Sahib Subah, Sardar, Maharaja of Nagpur
- Estate: Kingdom of Nagpur

The Bhonsles of Nagpur were a Maratha royal house that ruled the Kingdom of Nagpur from 1739 to 1853. They hailed from the Bhonsle clan of Marathas, and were one of the most important and powerful Maratha chiefs in the Maratha Empire.

== Origin ==
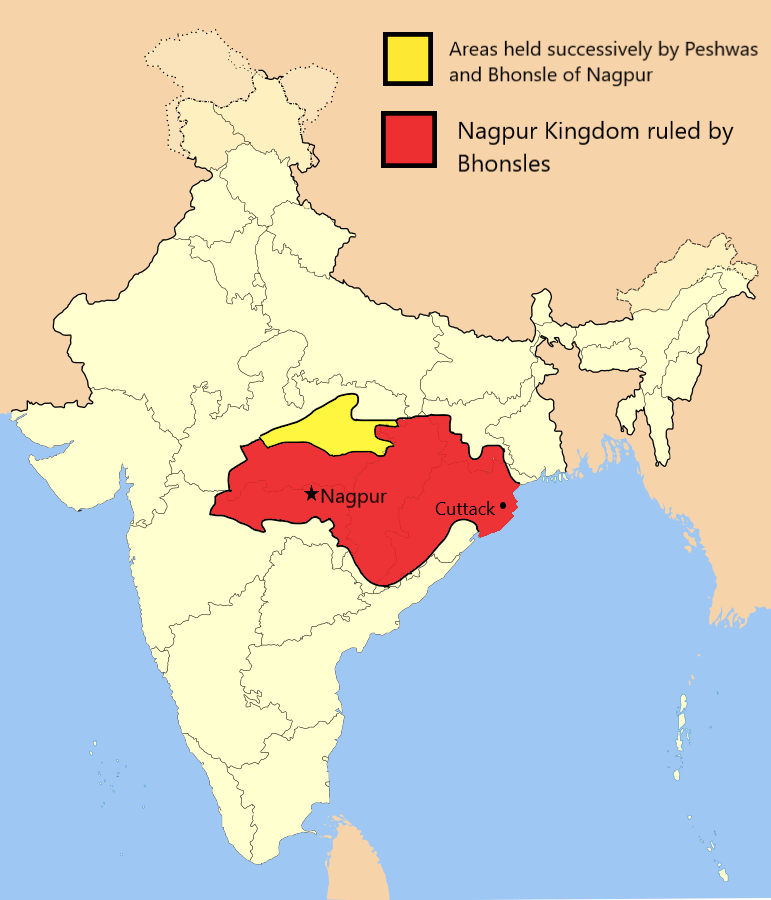
Bhonsle kingdom of Nagpur

The Bhonsle family branch of Raghoji was initially known as Hinganikar as they were originally chiefs of Berdi near Hingani in Pune District, established by Bimbaji Bhonsle I. The earliest prominent historically relevant members of the branch were the two brothers Rupaji I and Mudhoji Bhonsle. They served under Shivaji, a fellow Bhonsle clansman of the Verulkar branch. Mudhoji was bestowed with Pandogarh mauza in Maharashtra as a jagir for his spectacular exploits and his brother Rupaji I resided at Bham in the district of Yavatmal. Though Chhatrapati Shivaji favoured Rupaji, as Rupaji I was childless, his fiefdom passed over to his brother Mudhoji, which gave Hinganikar Bhonsles a foothold in east Maharashtra for future conquests. Mudhoji had three sons, Bapuji, Sabaji, and Parsoji who were entrusted with high military command and the forcible collection of chauth (tribute) in the Mughal territories of Berar. Mudhoji's son Sabaji was given the villages of Rakhswari and Poorkikotar; however, it was Parsoji who attained the highest position in the family during the Mughal–Maratha wars. The title of "Senasahibsubha" (meaning Master of provinces and armies) was bestowed on Parsoji Bhonsle by Chhatrapati Rajaram I, along with rights to regions of Devgad, Gondwana, Chanda and Varhad from where he could exact tribute and effectively settle. Bapuji only had one son Bimbaji who was the father of Raghuji I. Parsoji had three sons; Santaji, Kanhoji and Ranoji each with a distinguished career. Senasahibsubha Parsoji Bhonsle was among the first Maratha lords to pledge himself and his army of 20,000 to Chhatrapati Shahu I after his escape from Mughal camp. In recognition of these acts of loyalty, Shahu had the title of Senasahibsubha reconfirmed in 1708, along with various sanads for Parsoji.

Parsoji's son, Santaji Bhonsle, was part of various campaigns of Chhatrapati Shivaji and the other commanders, until his murder in Delhi during the 1719 campaign to depose Farrukhsiyar led by Senapati Khanderao Dabhade. Ranoji was given the title of Sawai Santaji (meaning Superior Santaji) along with other compensations for the loss of his brother's life. In 1722, Chhatrapati Shahu Maharaj presented Badnera and Amravati to Ranoji, further extending the presence of Hinganikar Bhonsles in the east. Kanhoji went on to secure the family title of Senasahibsubha after the death of Parsoji in 1709 or 1710. Senasahibsubha Kanhoji ruled for twenty years and laid the foundation of a strict rule in east Maharashtra.

== Ascension to power ==
After Chand Sultan, the Gond raja of Nagpur's death in 1739, there was quarrel over the succession, leading to the throne being usurped by Wali Shah, an illegitimate son of Bakht Buland Shah. Chand Sultan's widow invoked the aid of the Maratha leader Raghuji Bhonsle of Berar in the interest of her sons Akbar Shah and Burhan Shah. Wali Shah was put to death and the rightful heirs placed on the throne. Raghoji I Bhonsle was sent back to Berar with a plentiful bounty for his aid. The Maratha general judged that Nagpur must be a plentiful and rich country by the magnificence of his reward.

However, dissensions continued between the brothers and once again, the elder brother Burhan Shah requested the aid of Raghuji Bhonsle. Akbar Shah was driven into exile and finally poisoned at Hyderabad. However this time, Ragoji Bhonsle did not have the heart to leave such a plentiful and rich country, with it being within his grasp. He declared himself 'protector' of the Gond king. Thus in 1743, Burhan Shah was practically made a state pensionary, with real power being in the hands of the Maratha ruler. After this event the history of the Gond kingdom of Deogarh is not recorded. A series of Maratha rulers came to power following the fall of the Gonds from the throne of Nagpur, starting with Raghoji Bhonsle.

== History ==
The Bhonsles of Nagpur were near relations of Chhatrapati Shahu, who raised them to riches and power. Raghoji I Bhonsle overran Bengal and Bihar during the reign of Alivardi Khan, occupying Orissa from the Nawab of Bengal. However, they did not play any part in the Third Battle of Panipat and First Anglo-Maratha War, so they gradually sank to a secondary position in the Maratha Confederacy. The reason for their half-hearted cooperation with the other Maratha chiefs was that they were bribed by Warren Hastings. They were generally opposed to the Peshwa, and claimed independent authority as they essentially controlled the Gond king of Nagpur.

== Deposition ==
Raghuji Bhonsle III died without a male heir in 1853, and the kingdom was annexed by the British under the doctrine of lapse. The territories of the former kingdom was administered as Nagpur Province, under a commissioner appointed by the Governor-General of India, until the formation of the Central Provinces in 1861.

== Rulers ==
- Raghoji I Bhonsle (1739 – 14 Feb 1755)
- Janoji Bhonsle (1755 – 21 May 1772)
- Mudhoji Bhonsle (1772 – 19 May 1788)
- Raghoji II Bhonsle (1788 – 22 Mar 1816)
- Parsoji Bhonsle (1816 – 2 Feb 1817) (b. 1778 – d. 1817)
- Mudhoji II Bhonsle "Appa Sahib" (1817 – 15 Mar 1818) (b. 1796 – d. 1840)
- Raghuji Bhonsle III (1818 – 11 Dec 1853) (b. 1808 – d. 1853)
- Janoji Bhonsle II
- Raghuji Bhonsle IV (Senior)
- Laxmanrao Bhonsle (Junior)
- Pratapsingh Bhonsle I
- Udaysingh Bhonsle
- Pratapsingh Bhonsle II & Bhawanisingh
