= Raghoji II of Nagpur =

Raja of Nagpur from 1788 to 1816

Raghuji II
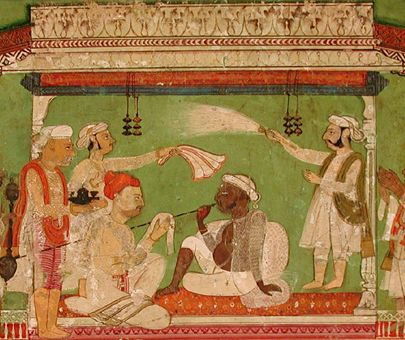
- Raghuji Bhonsle II

4th Raja of Nagpur
- Reign: 19 May 1788 – 22 March 1816
- Predecessor: Mudhoji I
- Successor: Parsoji
- Died: 22 March 1816; Nagpur
- Spouse: Baka Bai
- Issue: Raghuji Bhonsle III (adoptive son)
- House: Bhonsles of Nagpur
- Father: Madhoji Bhonsle
- Religion: Hinduism

Raghuji II (died 22 March 1816), or Raghuji was the Maratha ruler of the Kingdom of Nagpur in Central India from 1788 to 1816.

== Reign ==
Raghuji was adopted as an infant by his uncle Janoji Bhonsle to be his chosen heir. Janoji died in 1772, and his brothers fought for succession, until Madhoji shot the other in the Battle of Panchgaon, six miles south of Nagpur, and succeeded to the regency on behalf of Raghuji.

The Nagpur Kingdom reached its greatest extent in the first half of Raghuji's reign.

"The prince," writes Colebrooke, "has a taste for architecture, which he has displayed in the palace he has built for himself.” The building of the Nagpur palace took six years. Artisans from Delhi, Cuttack, and Kashi came to Nagpur. Masons and carpenters employed for building the new Bhonsle Palace were rewarded with golden bracelets worth Rs. 250 each.

There were four quadrangles and four halls of mirrors in this new palace. The Palace had 2 storeys and five halls of mirrors. Raghuji founded one new ward at Sonegaon. The temples of Tulshibag and Ram-Kshetra and one in Induli garden were built. Raghuji had the fort of Umred built and a map of Sioni fort prepared.

Daily, forty Brahmins dined in the Nagpur Bhonsle Palace. Raghuji built several temples and had idols of Vishnu, Lakshmi and Garuda ordered from Pune to be installed. Religious functions were marked by the distribution of lavish grants to the Brahmins. Cows with golden tops on the horns and silver hoofs were given to the Brahmins on the day of eclipse. Nearly one lakh every year were spent on charity. Throughout the year several festivals were celebrated with pomp and pleasure.

Nagpur at the end of the eighteenth century was a city of lakes and gardens.

The famous Henry Thomas Colebrooke was given one bungalow in the Telangkhedi garden by the Maratha King. Henry describes it thus "The garden is laid out in straight walks with cut hedges".

Henry Thomas Colebrooke describes another garden of Raghuji himself: "It is small but pretty; and the numerous buildings and splendid decoration are elegant. The effect is particularly pleasing at night, when the fountains play and the whole garden is illuminated." In 1792 Raghuji spent rupees 2 lakhs for the building of Tulshibag. Gardening experts were brought from Cuttack. A number of gardens are mentioned in the correspondence: Phutale lake, Sonegaon, Gulab (rose), Shivni, Induli, Hansaputi, Moti, and also personal gardens of Ramaji Tatya, Khushalpure, Umaji Mahadev, Manajirao Appasaheb Ghatge, Gujajiraje Babasaheb Gujar. Gardens of Telangkhedi, Sakardara and Najarbag were famous. The well-known lakes were Sakardara, Ambajhari, Telangkhedi, and Phutale.

There were more than 1500 wells in Nagpur city alone.

Like the contemporary kings, Raghuji was also fond of horses and his cavalry consisted of 10,000 horses. Horses from Lakhi jungle, along with Turki and Bhimthadi horses were purchased. The horse dealers were usually honoured with turbans and shawls. Raghuji was a superb rider of high pedigree horses like his ancestors and appreciated and rewarded excellent riders with gold bracelets and clothes of honour.

The Maratha sardars and the Nagpur Bhonsle family had many pastimes. Raghuji amused himself by witnessing animal fights, firing rockets, shooting arrows, fishing, playing sticks (bothati), or game of chance, horse riding, and boating.

Dancing girls from far and wide came to Nagpur for their performances. Venkat Narsi from Karnataka, Firoz, Lallan and Rami from Pune and one from Ujjain came and performed their dances. Singers were rewarded after their test was taken. Lady singers like Krishna, Bagi, Gendi, and male singers like Alamshayen, Jafar Khan and Mithumia from Lucknow, and Karim Khan had their sittings in the Maratha kingdom.

In spite of his weaknesses, Raghuji II's rule was lauded by many. Blunt, while travelling in 1795, entered the dominion of the Bhonsles and wrote, "The change of the scene was truly gratifying: and the Maratha government being well established and the country highly cultivated, we met with civil treatment and abundance of every species of grain." Nagpur, under Raghuji II, was a prosperous and jubilant city in the eighteenth century.

== Battles with the British ==
Raghoji II acquired Hoshangabad and the lower Narmada valley between 1796 and 1798. In 1803 Raghuji united with Daulat Rao Sindhia of Gwalior against the British East India Company in the Second Anglo-Maratha War. The two Maratha rulers were decisively defeated at Assaye and Argaon, and by the Treaty of Deogaon of that year Raghuji ceded Cuttack, southern Berar, and Sambalpur to the British, although Sambalpur and Patna was not relinquished until 1806.

To the close of the 18th century the Maratha administration had been on the whole good, and the country had prospered. The first four of the Bhonsales were military chiefs with the habits of rough soldiers, connected by blood and by constant familiar interaction with all their principal officers. Up to 1792 their territories were seldom the theater of hostilities, and the area of cultivation and revenue continued to increase under a fairly equitable and extremely simple system of government. After the Treaty of Deogaon, however, all this had changed. Raghuji II was deprived of a third of his territories, and he attempted to make up the loss of revenue from the remainder. The villages were mercilessly rack-rented, and many new taxes imposed.

During the Bhonsle-English wars the Nawab of Bhopal had taken Husangabad and Sivani from the Bhonsle. In 1807 Raghuji sent his army and captured Cainpurvadi and Cankigad of the Bhopal territory. Later he entered into an agreement with the Shindes for a concerted attack on Bhopal. The two armies besieged Bhopal fort in 1814. But Raghuji withdrew his forces when the Nawab of Bhopal asked for British help.

The pay of the troops was in arrears, and they maintained themselves by plundering the cultivators, while at the same time commenced the raids of the Pindaris, who became so bold that in 1811 they advanced to Nagpur and burnt the suburbs. It was at this time that most of the numerous village forts were built, to which on the approach of these marauders the peasant retired and fought for bare life, all he possessed outside the walls being already lost to him.

Raghuji died on 22 March 1816 and succeeded by his son Parsoji II.

== Personal life ==
Raghoji II's favourite queen was Bakabai. He was "pious and devoted to his mother".

Preceded by Mudhoji I	King of Nagpur; 1788–1816	Succeeded by Parasoji Bhonsle
