= William Harris, 2nd Baron Harris =

British soldier and peer

Lieutenant-General The Right Honourable The Lord Harris KCH CB
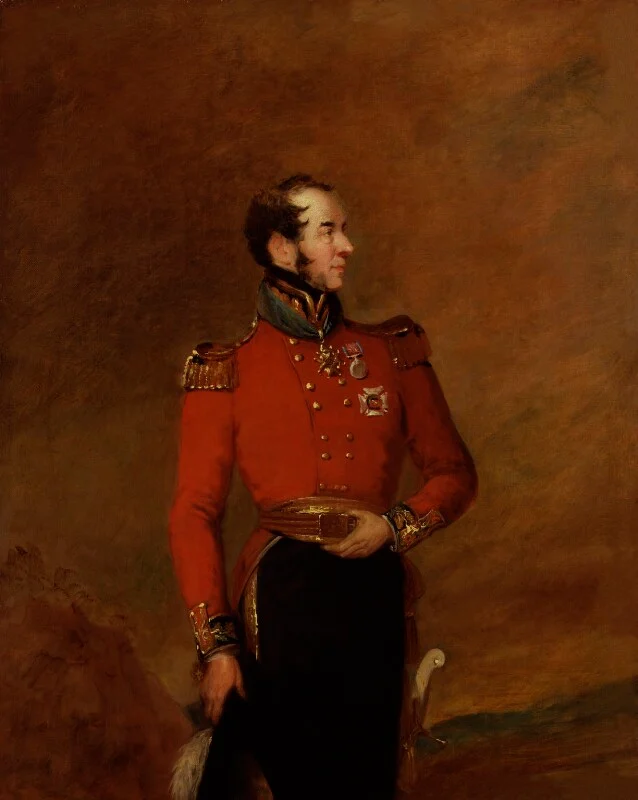
- Harris as a colonel
- Born: William George Harris; 19 January 1782; Kent, England
- Died: 10 May 1845 (aged 63)
- Military career
- Allegiance: United Kingdom
- Branch: British Army
- Service years: 1795–1845
- Rank: Lieutenant-General
- Units: 74th Highlanders (1795–1800); 49th Regiment of Foot (1800–1805); 73rd Regiment of Foot (1805–1815)
- Commands: Northern England Military District (1825–1828); 86th Regiment of Foot (1832–1835); 73rd Regiment of Foot (1835–1845)
- Conflicts: Fourth Anglo-Mysore War; Battle of Mallavelly; Siege of Seringapatam; French Revolutionary Wars; Battle of Copenhagen; Napoleonic Wars; Battle of Blaauwberg; War of the Sixth Coalition; Battle of the Göhrde; Siege of Antwerp; Hundred Days; Battle of Quatre Bras; Battle of Waterloo (WIA)
- Awards: Order of the Netherlands Lion; Waterloo Medal

Lieutenant-General William George Harris, 2nd Baron Harris (19 January 1782 – 30 May 1845), was a British Army officer and peer.

== Life ==
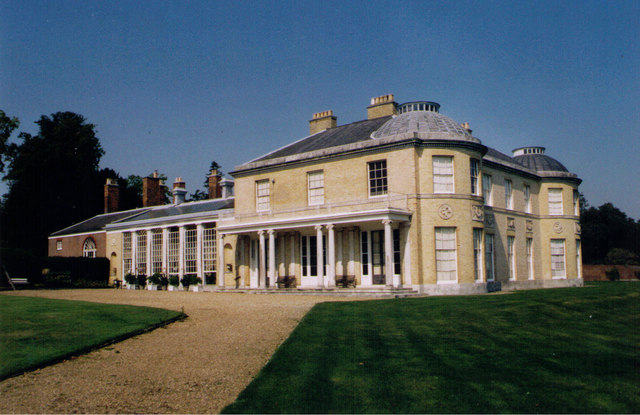
Belmont House, Kent – the Harris family seat

Harris was the son of General George Harris, 1st Baron Harris.

He fought under his father during the siege and capture of Seringapatam in 1799 at the age of 17. He later became a Lieutenant-General in the British Army and commanded the 73rd Regiment of Foot at the Battle of Waterloo in 1815. He succeeded his father in 1829 to the barony and the family seat of Belmont House and Gardens near Faversham in Kent.

He was given the colonelcy of the 86th Foot from 1832 to 1835 and his old regiment, the 73rd Foot, from 1835 to his death.

Lord Harris died in May 1845, aged 63. He had married Isabella Helana Handcock-Temple of Waterstown, Co. Westmeath on 28 May 1824. She was obliged by a previous will to continue the Temple name. William George Harris moved into Waterstown House after the wedding. He was succeeded in the barony by his son George.

His great-grandson is Michael Marriott.

== Arms ==
Coat of arms of William Harris, 2nd Baron Harris

Crest
On a mural crown Or a royal tiger passant-guardant Vert striped Or spotted of the first pierced in the breast with an arrow of the last vulned Gules charged on the forehead with a Persian character for Ryder and crowned with an Eastern coronet both of the first.
Escutcheon
Vert on a chevron embattled, erminois between three hedgehogs Or, as many bombs Sable fired Proper a chief of augmentation thereon the gates and fortress of Seringapatam the draw-bridge let down and the Union flag of Great Britain and Ireland hoisted over the standard of Tippoo Sahib all Proper.
Supporters
Dexter a Grenadier soldier of the 73rd Regiment in his regimentals Proper supporting with his exterior hand a staff thereon hoisted the union flag of Great Britain and Ireland over that of the standard of Tippoo Sahib and beneath the tri-coloured flag entwined, inscribed with the word "Republique"; sinister a Malay soldier in his uniform Proper supporting a like staff thereon hoisted the flag of the East India Company Argent striped barwise Gules with a canton, over the standard of Tippoo Sahib with the tri-coloured flag entwined beneath as on the dexter inscribed with the word "Franeaise" all Proper.
Motto
My Prince and My Country.

Peerage of the United Kingdom
Preceded by George Harris, 1st Baron	Baron Harris; 1829–1845	Succeeded by George Harris, 3rd Baron
Military offices
Preceded by Sir Frederick Adam	Colonel of the 73rd Regiment of Foot; 1835–1845	Succeeded by Sir Robert Henry Dick
Preceded by Francis Needham, 1st Earl of Kilmorey	Colonel of the 86th (Royal County Down) Regiment of Foot; 1832–1835	Succeeded by Sir Frederick Ponsonby
