= Obelisk Monument =

Commemorative edifice in Karnataka state, India

Coordinates: 12°25′31.5″N 76°40′26.7″E

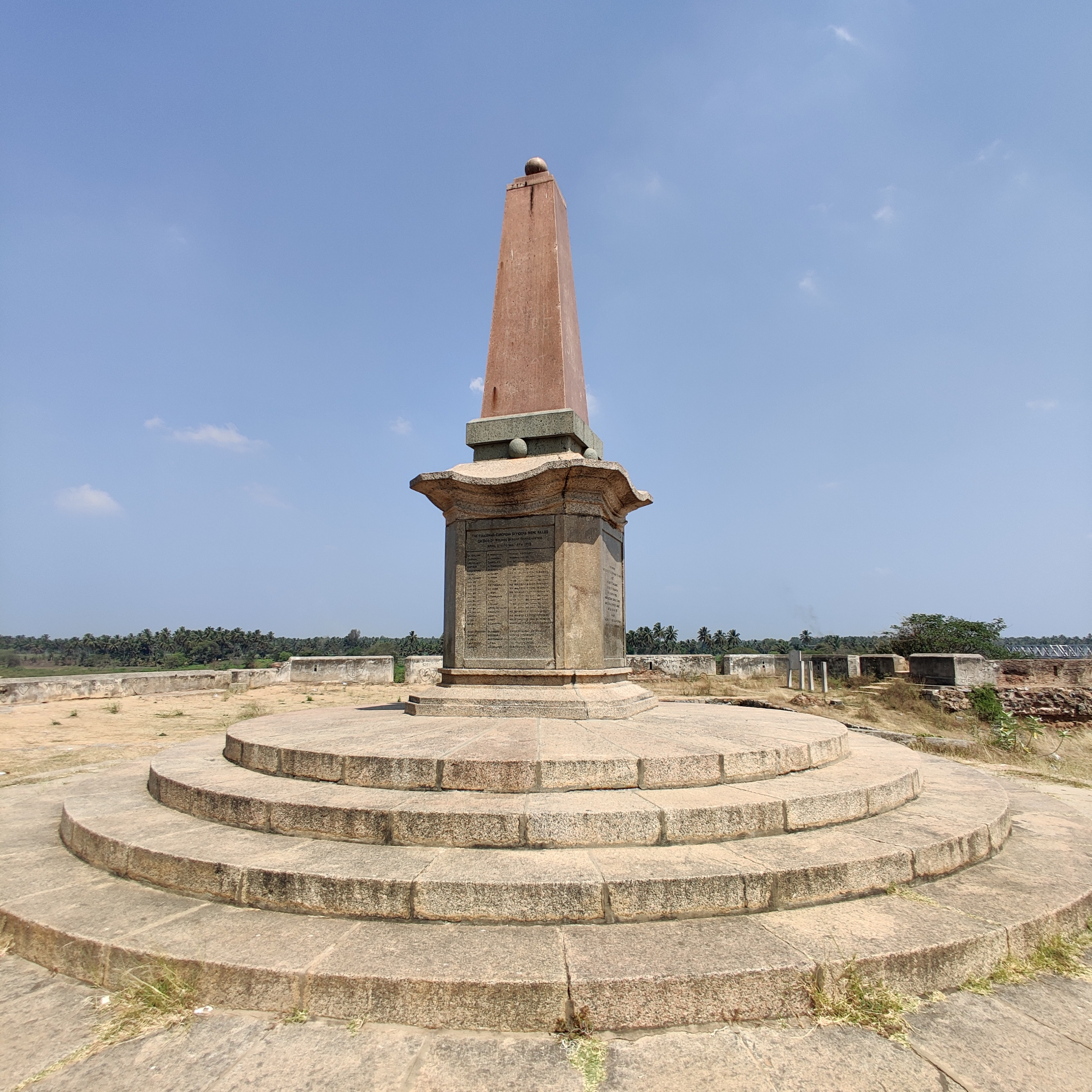
The Obelisk Monument. also known as the Siege Monument, in Srirangapatna

Obelisk Monument, also known as the Siege Monument, is a commemorative edifice built in Srirangapatna in the Indian state of Karnataka. It marks the memory of the British officers and native soldiers who lost their lives during the siege of Srirangapatna on 4 May 1799 during the last Fourth Anglo-Mysore war fought during 1798-99 between the British army and the forces of the Mysore Kingdom led by Tipu Sultan. The British army was led by the British General Harris. The memorial was built during the reign of Krishna Raja Wadiyar IV in 1907 as a mark of gratitude by the Wadiyars for getting back their throne from the Sultans.

The Obelisk is a tapering narrow structure of polished stone in the form of a square base with a conical tower supported on four cannon balls. The conically tapering top at the pinnacle is fitted with a cannon ball. At the base, four plaques are fitted, one on each of the square faces of the obelisk, which commemorate not only the siege operations of 4 May 1799 but also the martyrdom of British officers and soldiers of the British army and also the Indian (native) soldiers.

== History ==
Before the start of the Fourth Anglo-Mysore war in February 1799, the British forces had intercepted several letters which revealed Tipu Sultan's plans to attack them and they declared war in February 1799; the war was short lived and ended in May 1799.

During Third Anglo-Mysore War Tipu Sultan had become militarily and politically weak and as a result he had built up an alliance with the French and planned invasion in Vellore, Porto Novo and Mysore Kingdom. Knowing this situation, the then Governor-General of India, Richard Wellesley, found it an appropriate time to attack Mysore and collected and substantial forces.

In February 1799, an Army of East India Company (EIC) sepoys (native soldiers) and cavalry were assembled in Madras (now Chennai) under the British General Harris with an additional contingent from the Nizam of Hyderabad, and Marathas, and they were ordered to invade Mysore Kingdom of Tipu Sultan. The British invading army included the Swiss Regiment of de Meuroan armed with cannons and was accompanied by his elephants, camels and other paraphernalia for food. The official version of casualties of the British as recorded on the Obelisk is 132 dead, 657 injured and 25 untraced.

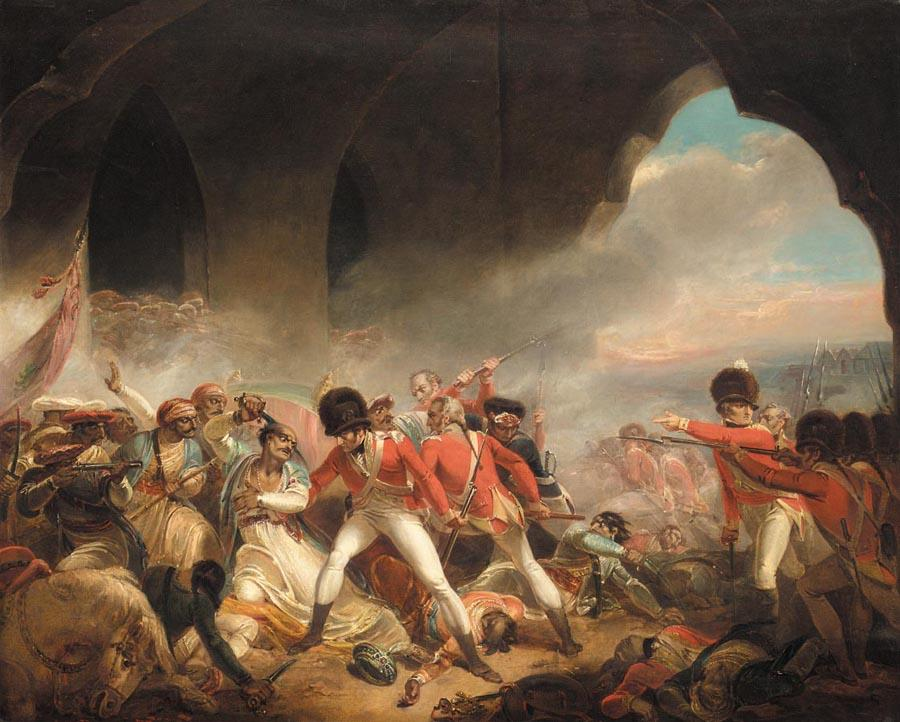
The Last Effort and Fall of Tippoo Sultaun by Henry Singleton. The Fourth Mysore War or the Siege of Seringapatam (1799) when Tipu Sultan was killed on 4 May 1799

At Srirangpatna (Seringapatam in British usage), Tipu Sultan and his army who were well ensconced within the fort, were besieged by the British forces on 5 April 1799. The River Cauvery, which flowed around the city of Seringapatam, was at its lowest level of the year and could be easily forded. After a series of war manoeuvers and fights over more than a month by both sides, the storming party of the British officers and soldiers finally, on 4 May 1799, crossed the river in four feet deep water, with covering fire from British batteries, and within 16 minutes had scaled the ramparts and swept aside the defenders quickly. The British follow-up columns turned right and left, sweeping along the inside of the walls until they met on the far side of the city. Copied content from Siege of Seringapatam (1799) Swiss soldiers headed by de Meuroan strategically breached one of the corners of the defense walls. These brave soldiers were hailed in French poetic terms. Even at the beginning of the war, Tipu's forces were outnumbered by the British who were better equipped.

Then, the column that rounded the northwest corner of the outer wall was immediately involved in a serious fight with a group of Mysorean warriors under a fat officer, which defended every traverse. The officer was observed to be discharging hunting weapons loaded and passed to him by servants. After the fall of the city, on 4 May 1799, in the gathering dusk, some of the British officers went to look for the body of Tipu Sultan. He was identified as the fat officer who had fired hunting weapons at the attackers, and his body was found in a choked tunnel-like passage near the Water Gate. Tipu had suffered three wounds including one on his temple and he died the same day on 4 May 1799. The war thus ended. The British, allied with the Portuguese of Goa and Daman, Nizam Ali Khan, 2nd Nizam of Hyderabad, and Marathas, achieved a decisive victory against Tipu Sultan. Charles Daniel de Meuron who fought bravely with his soldiers at the crucial stage of the war was later elevated as a Major General and eventually as Lieutenant General of the British army, but he later returned to Switzerland. General Harris and his soldiers who led the battle against Tipu Sultan were honoured in 1907, more than 100 years after the siege of Srirngapatna, with an Obelisk Monument by Krishna Raja Wadiyar IV of the Wodeyar Kingdom of Mysore. The memorial was erected much after the death of Tipu Sultan in 1799; this was more to record gratitude by the Wadiyars for regaining their throne from the Sultans.

== Structure ==
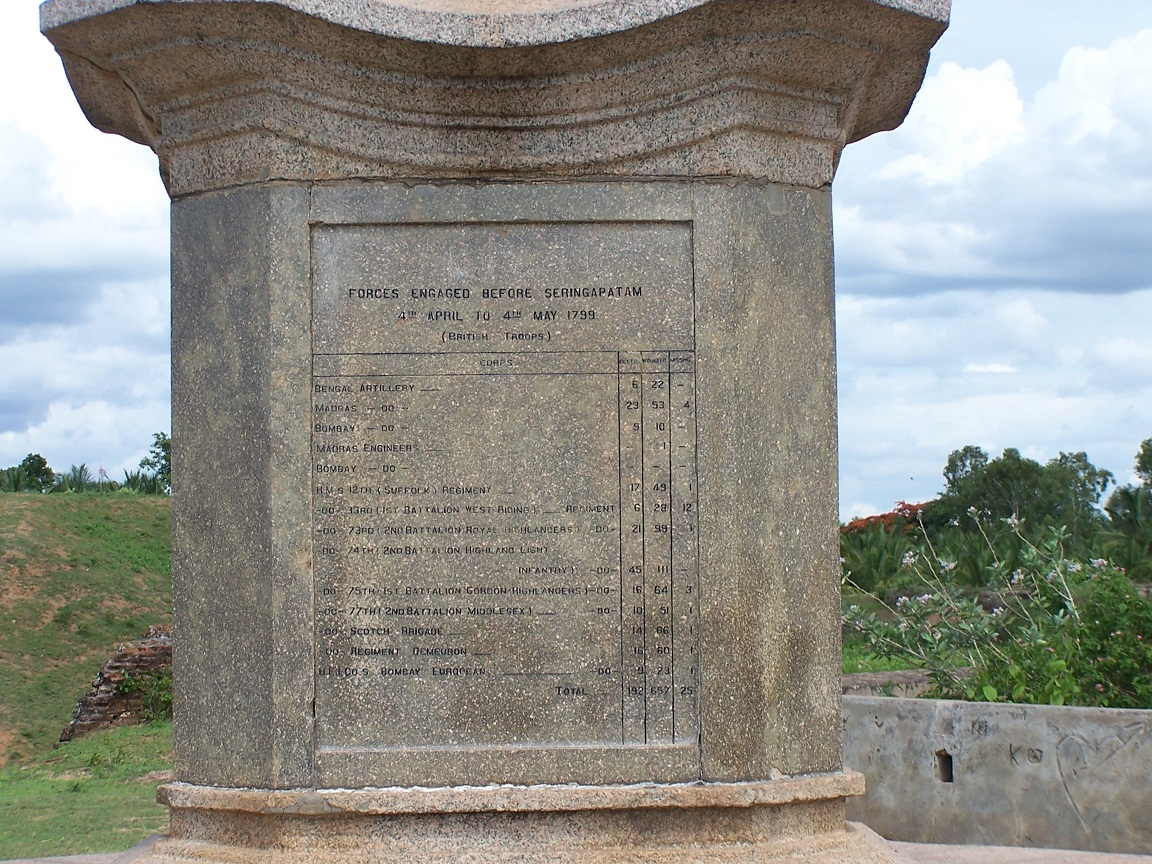
Front face of the square shaped structure fitted with a plaque giving details of the Siege of Seringapatam (1799)

The Obelisk is located on an elevated land near the walls of the Srirangapatna Fort in Srirangapatna (also known during the British Raj as Seringapatam). It is set up at the centre of a spread-out concentric series of steps, on a high point at the northwestern corner on one end of the island on the Cauvery River, near the more famous Ranganathaswamy temple.

The obelisk structure is narrow with shining stone built over a series of steps in a spacious concentric circular surface as basement, at an elevated location close to the fort walls. The initial lower portion of the main structure above the basement is of square shape with plaques fixed on each of its four phases, followed by pyramidal or conical tall post founded over four cannons and tapering to a pinnacle fitted with a cannon ball; the plaques are inscribed with details of the siege of Srirangapatna during 4 April-5 May 1799.

On the front face of the Obelisk, the plaque gives a general description of the siege as: "This monument is erected by the Government of Mysore in 1907 in order to commemorate the Siege of Seringapatam by the British forces under Lieutenant General G. Harris and its final capture by assault on 5th May 1799, as also the names of those gallant officers who fell during the operations." However, it may be mentioned that in the war, the combined forces of the British East India Company and their allies who fought in the war were 50,000 soldiers in all, while the soldiers of the Kingdom of Mysore, ruled by Tipu Sultan, were 30,000. It is also said that about 80 men of the Swiss ‘de Meuron Regiment’, who fell during the siege, and their family members are buried in the Garrison Cemetery, Seringapatam.

The second plaque makes specific mention of the British casualties in the war with lists giving the number of soldiers and officers wounded, killed or missing for the siege (5 April to 4 May 1799). The final count of casualties inscribed on the plaque reports 192 dead, 657 injured and 25 not traced.

In the last two faces of the edifice, the plaques lists the rank, name and the regiment of the European officers who were martyred in the siege.
