= The Last Effort and Fall of Tippoo Sultaun =

Painting by Henry Singleton

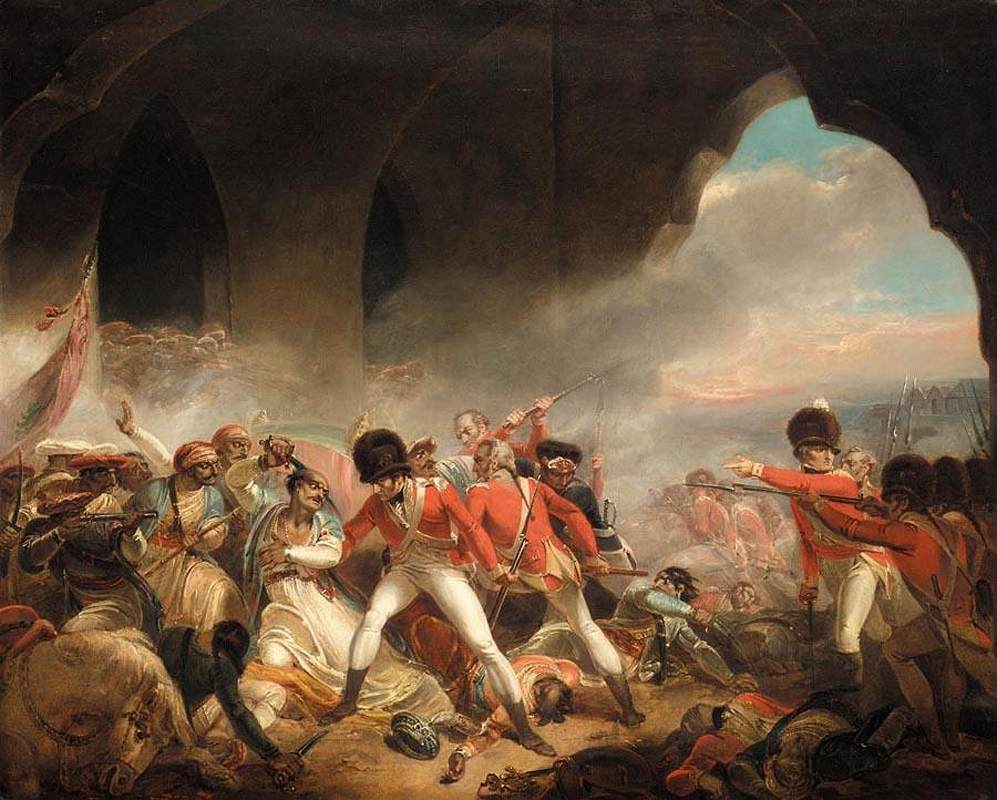
- Artist: Henry Singleton
- Year: c.1800
- Type: Oil on canvas, history painting
- Dimensions: 101 cm × 126 cm (40 in × 50 in)
- Location: Private collection

The Last Effort and Fall of Tippoo Sultaun is an 1800 history painting by the British artist Henry Singleton. It depicts the death of the Tipu Sultan, ruler of Mysore, on 4 May 1799 while fighting British troops during the Siege of Seringapatam. A British army led by George Harris had besieged the French-allied Tipu's capital as part of the Fourth Anglo-Mysore War, a campaign in which the future Duke of Wellington served. The city was stormed on 4 May and the Tipu was killed in fighting around the Water Gate.

Singleton specialised in portraits and history paintings. He exhibited at the Royal Academy of Arts's Summer Exhibition for many decades, although he was never elected as a member of the academy. It was one of a series of four paintings by Singleton portraying events during the siege along with The Surrender of the Two Sons of Tippoo Sultaun to Sir David Baird, The Assault and Taking of Seringapatam and The Body of Tippoo Sultaun recognised by his Family. An 1802 print by Niccolo Schiavonetti based on Singleton's painting is now in the collection of the British Museum.

== See also ==
- Sir David Baird Discovering the Body of Sultan Tipoo Sahib, an 1839 painting by David Wilkie

== Bibliography ==
- Almeida, Hermionede. Indian Renaissance: British Romantic Art and the Prospect of India. Routledge, 2017.
- Hasan, Mohibbul. History of Tipu Sultan. Aakar Books, 2005.
- Llewellyn-Jones, Rosie. The Last King in India: Wajid 'Ali Shah, 1822-1887. Oxford University Press, 2014.
