= 73rd (Perthshire) Regiment of Foot =

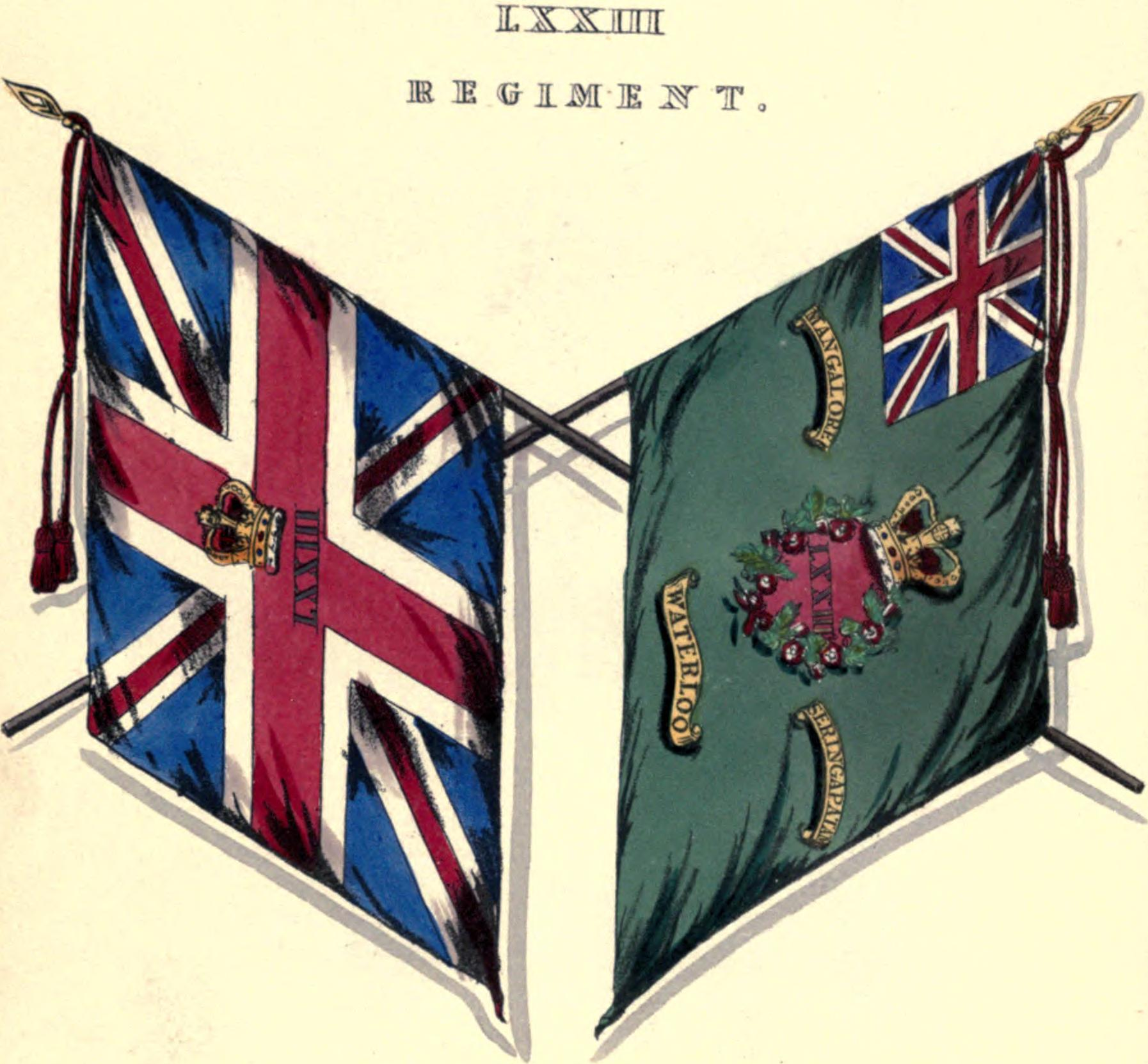
- Regimental colours
- Active: 1780–1881
- Country: Kingdom of Great Britain (1780–1800); United Kingdom (1801–1881)
- Branch: British Army
- Type: Infantry
- Size: One battalion (two battalions 1809–1817)
- Garrison/HQ: Hamilton Barracks
- Engagements: Second Anglo-Mysore War; Third Anglo-Mysore War; French Revolutionary Wars; Fourth Anglo-Mysore War; Napoleonic Wars; Second Kandyan War; Uva Rebellion; Seventh Xhosa War; Indian Rebellion

The 73rd Regiment of Foot was an infantry regiment of the British Army, raised in 1780. Under the Childers Reforms it amalgamated with the 42nd Regiment of Foot to form the Black Watch (Royal Highlanders) in 1881.

== History ==
=== Formation ===
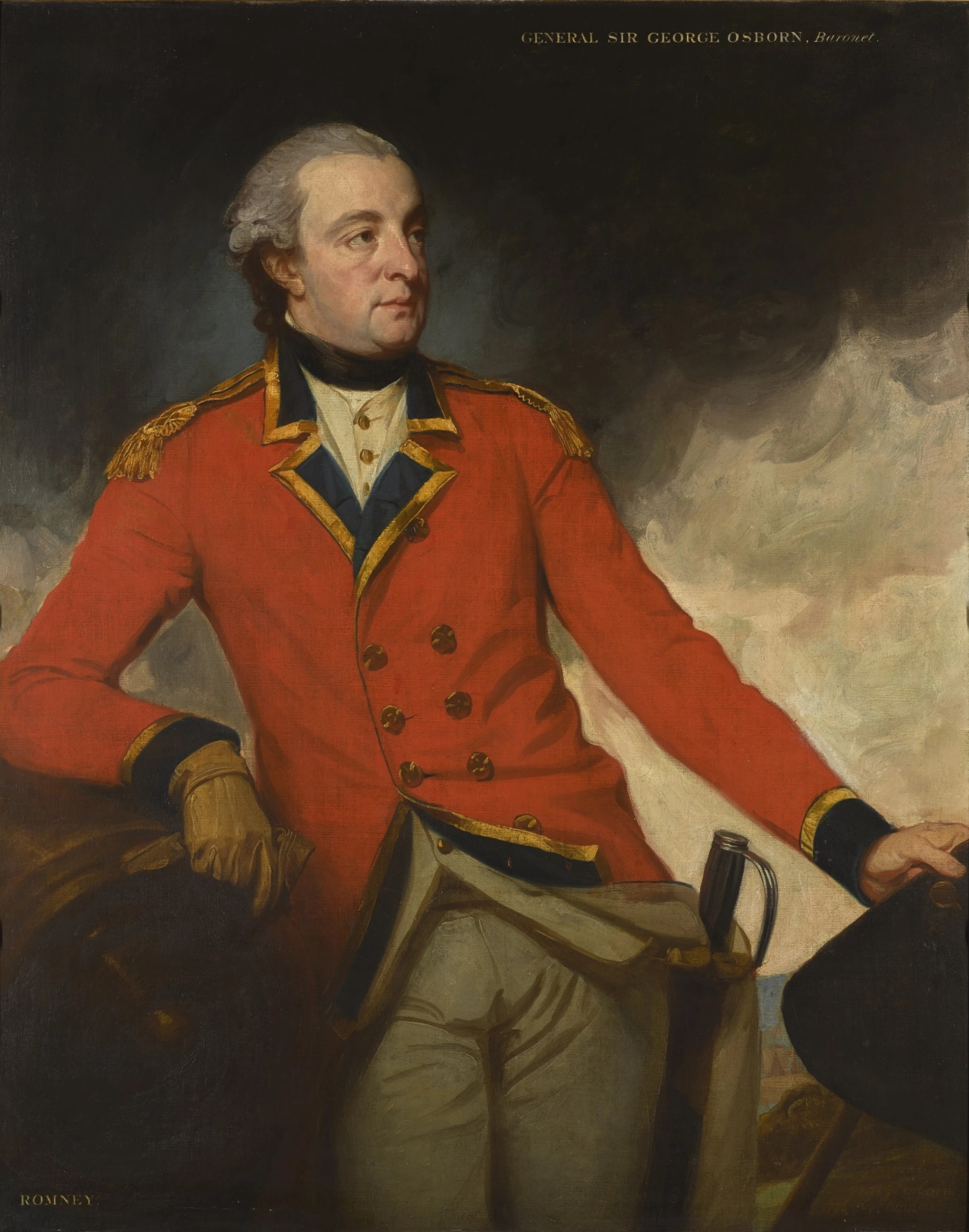
Sir George Osborn, the regiment's first colonel

The regiment was raised as the 2nd Battalion, 42nd (Royal Highland) Regiment of Foot in March 1780, with eight officers from the 1st Battalion being detached to help raise the new battalion. The battalion was sent to India in January 1781 and took part in the siege of Mangalore in autumn 1783 during the Second Anglo-Mysore War. It was still in India when the battalion received regimental status in 1786 as the 73rd (Highland) Regiment of Foot. The new regiment remained in India and saw action at the siege of Seringapatam in 1792 during the Third Anglo-Mysore War, the siege of Pondicherry in August 1793 during the French Revolutionary Wars and the capture of the Dutch settlements in Ceylon in 1795. It went on to form part of the storming party at the siege of Seringapatam in April 1799 during the Fourth Anglo-Mysore War before returning to England in July 1806.

=== Napoleonic Wars ===
==== 1st Battalion ====
In April 1809 the regiment raised a second battalion in Nottingham from local militia companies and lost its Highland status due to recruiting difficulties, becoming the 73rd Regiment of Foot. The 1st Battalion embarked at Yarmouth for a seven-month journey to New South Wales, Australia in May 1809. The battalion's role was to ensure the newly appointed New South Wales Governor Lachlan Macquarie was able to govern after the previously appointed governor William Bligh was deposed by leading members of the New South Wales Corps (102nd Regiment of Foot) in the Rum Rebellion. There in 1810 they received a draft of men from the New South Wales Corps. The 73rd Regiment was under the command of Maurice Charles O'Connell who married Mary Putland, the widowed daughter of William Bligh in May 1810, which created ongoing tension with the leaders of the Rum Rebellion (such as John Macarthur) who were highly influential members of society within New South Wales. To reduce these tensions, the main body of the battalion left New South Wales in April 1814 on the General Hewitt for Ceylon. During the tour in Ceylon the battalion was under the command of Lieutenant Colonel Andrew Geils, whose children, along with hundreds of wounded men of the regiment, perished in May 1815 in the wreck of the Arniston after visiting him there.

The battalion took part in the Second Kandyan War in Ceylon in 1815. Following the disbanding of the 2nd Battalion in 1817, some 300 of its remaining soldiers were sent out to Trincomalee to join the 1st battalion. In that year the regiment took part in suppressing the Uva Rebellion, losing 412 out of approximately 1,000 men.

==== 2nd Battalion ====
The 2nd Battalion remained in England until May 1813 when it was shipped to Swedish Pomerania and fought at the Battle of the Göhrde in September 1813 and the Battle of Merxem in January 1814. In 1815 the battalion joined Wellington's Army in Belgium: the regiment was in Major-General Colin Halkett's Brigade in Lieutenant General Sir Charles Alten's 3rd Division. The battalion fought in the Battle of Quatre Bras on 16 June 1815 where they lost 53 men killed and wounded. At the subsequent Battle of Waterloo on 18 June, the regiment was charged by French Cavalry no less than 11 times during the battle and bombarded by French artillery. It remained in square without breaking. The battalion lost 6 officers and 225 men killed and wounded, the second heaviest casualties suffered by a line infantry regiment, after the 1st Battalion 27th (Inniskillings), which lost 450 out of 700 men in holding their square and Wellington's line. The battalion formed part of the Army of Occupation in Paris before moving back to England in December 1815.

=== The Victorian era ===
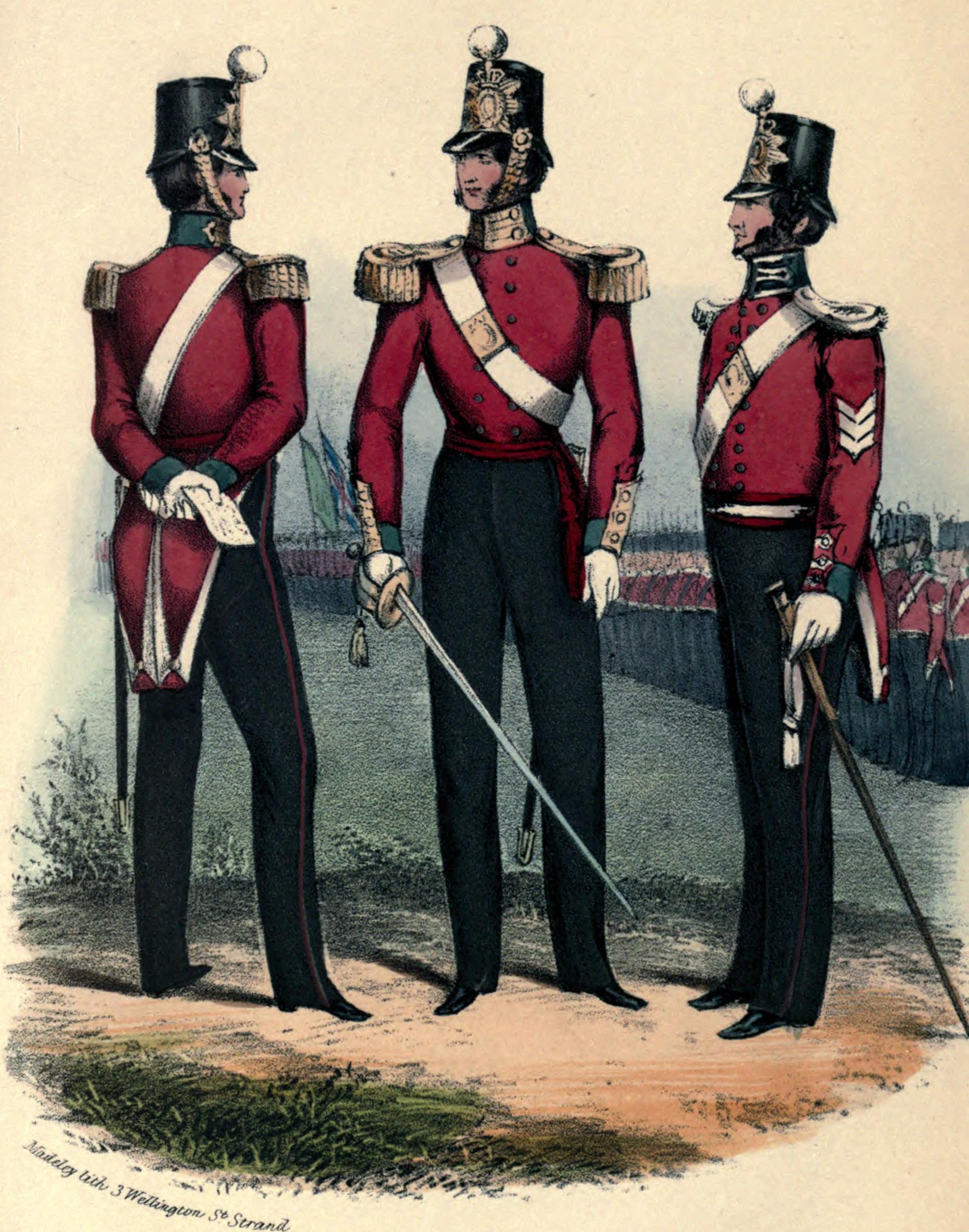
The regimental uniform in 1851

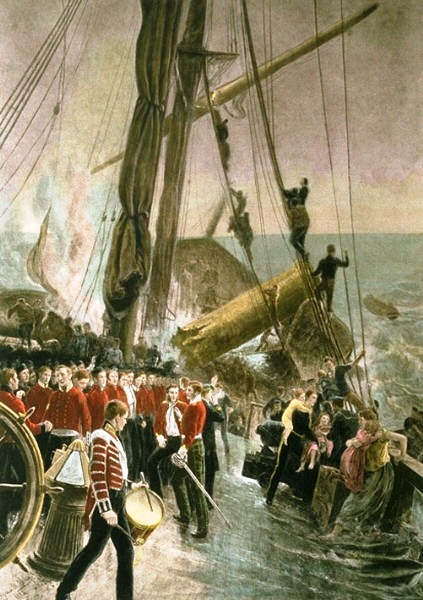
The regiment onboard HMS Birkenhead on 28 February 1852

In November 1821 the regiment returned home from Ceylon. It was posted to Gibraltar in August 1827 and to Nova Scotia in April 1838. After returning to England in June 1841, the regiment succeeded in having its Highland status restored, in so far as it was re-designated The 73rd (Highland) Regiment of Foot in 1845.

In January 1846, the 73rd Highlanders arrived in Argentina to protect British interests during the Uruguayan Civil War. The regiment then sailed on to the Cape Colony to take part in the Seventh Xhosa War. In 1852 a detachment from the regiment departed Simon's Town aboard the troopship HMS Birkenhead bound for Port Elizabeth. At two o'clock in the morning on 28 February 1852, the ship struck rocks at Danger Point, just off Gansbaai. The troops assembled on deck, and allowed the women and children to board the lifeboats first, but then stood firm as the ship sank when told by officers that jumping overboard and swimming to the lifeboats would mostly likely upset those boats and endanger the civilian passengers. 357 men drowned.

In 1857 the regiment helped to suppress the Indian Rebellion seeing some action in Central India. In 1862 it received a new title becoming the 73rd (Perthshire) Regiment of Foot. The regiment was posted to Hong Kong in 1866, back to Ceylon in 1871, and to India in 1874.

As part of the Cardwell Reforms of the 1870s, where single-battalion regiments were linked together to share a single depot and recruiting district in the United Kingdom, the 73rd was linked with the 90th Regiment of Foot (Perthshire Volunteers), and assigned to district no. 60 at Hamilton Barracks. On 1 July 1881 the Childers Reforms came into effect and the regiment amalgamated with the 42nd Regiment of Foot, the regiment they originated from 95 years earlier, to form the Black Watch (Royal Highlanders).

== Battle honours ==
Battle honours won by the regiment were:

- Anglo-Mysore Wars: Mangalore, Seringapatam
- Napoleonic Wars: Waterloo

== Colonels of the Regiment ==
Colonels of the Regiment were:

- 1786: Gen. Sir George Osborn, 4th Baronet
- 1786–1796: Gen. Sir William Medows, KB

=== 73rd (Highland) Regiment of Foot – (1787) ===
- 1796–1800: Gen. Gerard Lake, 1st Viscount Lake
- 1800–1829: Gen. George Harris, 1st Baron Harris of Seringapatam and Mysore, GCB

=== 73rd Regiment of Foot – (1809) ===
- 1829–1835: Gen. Sir Frederick Adam, GCB, GCMG
- 1835–1845: Lt-Gen. William George Harris, 2nd Baron Harris of Seringapatam and Mysore, CB, KCH

=== 73rd (Highland) Regiment of Foot – (1845) ===
- 1845–1846: Maj-Gen. Sir Robert Henry Dick, KCB, KCH (died of wounds at the Battle of Sobraon)
- 1846–1849: Gen. Sir John Grey, KCB
- 1849–1852: Lt-Gen. Sir Richard Goddard Hare Clarges, KCB
- 1852–1857: Lt-Gen. Robert Barclay Macpherson, CB, KH
- 1857–1860: Lt-Gen. Chesborough Grant Falconar, KH
- 1860: Maj-Gen. Sir Michael Creagh, KH
- 1860–1865: Lt-Gen. Benjamin Orlando Jones, KH

=== 73rd (Perthshire) Regiment of Foot – (1862) ===
- 1865–1881: Gen. Sir Henry Robert Ferguson-Davie, Bt.

== Sources ==
- Cannon, Richard (1851). Historical record of the Seventy-Third Regiment containing an account of the formation of the regiment from the period of its being raised as the second battalion of the 42nd Royal Highlanders in 1780 and of its subsequent services to 1851. CIHM/ICMH Microfiche. Parker, Furnivall and Parker. OCLC 1083488364.
- Powell, Geoffrey (1973). The Kandyan Wars: The British Army in Ceylon, 1803–1818. London: Leo Cooper. ISBN 0-85052-106-8.
- Raikes, Henry (1846). Memoir of the Life and Services of Vice-admiral Sir Jahleel Brenton. Hatchet & Son. p. 527. "arniston wreck giels."
