= Battle of Mallavelly =

Engagement in Fourth Anglo-Mysore War

- Part of the Fourth Anglo-Mysore War
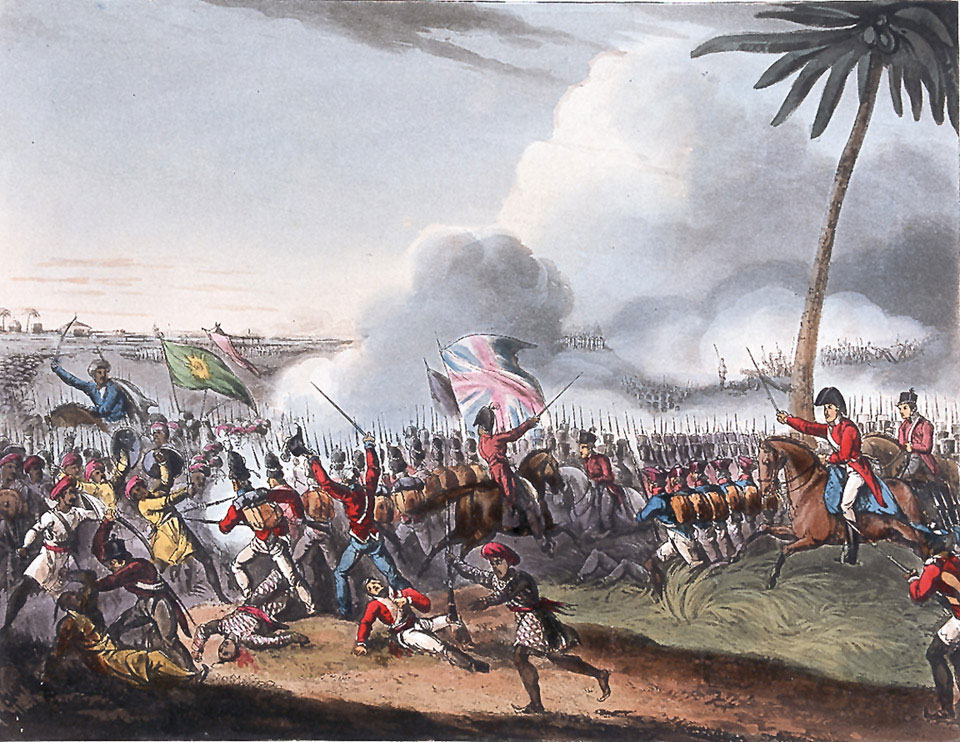
- 1816 aquatint engraving of the battle
Date	27 March 1799
Location	Malavalli, Karnataka, India 12.347139°N 77.064333°E
Result	British victory

Belligerents
British East India Company	Mysore

Commanders and leaders
George Harris; Arthur Wellesley	Tipu Sultan

Casualties and losses
66–69 men (Note: "In this battle Tipu sustained a loss of nearly two thousand, including some of his most valuable officers; whilst the British casualties amounted to only sixty-six men" (Carter 1861, p. 3); "The loss of the English was sixty-nine men, that of the Sultan more than a thousand" (Mill & Wilson 1858, p. 86).)	1,000–2,000

The Battle of Mallavelly (also spelled Malvilly or Malavalli) was fought on 27 March 1799 between forces of the British East India Company and the Kingdom of Mysore during the Fourth Anglo-Mysore War. The British forces, led by General George Harris and Colonel Arthur Wellesley, drove the Mysorean force of Tipu Sultan from a defensive position designed to impede the British force's progress toward Mysore's capital, Seringapatam.

== Prelude ==
Although the reduction of the power and resources of Tipu Sultan, effected by the Treaty of Seringapatam, which terminated the Third Anglo-Mysore War of 1792, had weakened his influence, he remained a perceived threat to the British East India Company. The Sultan had entered into negotiations with the Governor of the Isle of France (Mauritius) in 1798, and sent an embassy to Zaman Shah, ruler of Kabul, for the purpose of inducing him to attack the possessions of the East India Company. Having also derived encouragement from the successes of Napoleon's Egyptian Campaign, from which France intended to act against the British dominions in India, Tipu commenced augmenting his military force, and his hostile designs against the British became every day more apparent. Governor-General Richard, Earl of Mornington (afterwards Marquess of Wellesley), perceiving a rupture inevitable, resolved to launch a preemptive strike, and ordered the army to take the field and march into the heart of Tipu's Mysore territory.

Major-General George (afterward Lord) Harris, who was serving with the local rank of lieutenant-general, in conformity to these orders, advanced the army under his command on 11 February 1799 and entered Mysore territory on 5 March.

== Battle ==
On 27 March 1799, British troops arrived at Mallavelly, and on approaching the ground of the encampment the forces of Tipu were seen drawn up at a height a few miles off. The enemy attacked the advanced pickets, and a general action ensued, in which the 33rd Regiment of Foot highly distinguished itself. A body of two thousand men moved forward in the best order towards the regiment, which held its fire until the enemy came within about 60 yards (55 m). Then, led by its lieutenant-colonel, Arthur Wellesley (the future Duke of Wellington and the brother of the Governor-General), it made a bayonet charge, forcing the approaching column to give way. This movement, being supported by Major-General Floyd, who made a rapid charge with the cavalry, completed the disorder, and the enemy retreated before the whole of the British line, which immediately moved forward.

While this attack was being made by the left wing, under Lieutenant-Colonel Wellesley, with the Nizam's contingent, the 33rd, and Major-General Floyd's cavalry, Lieutenant-General Harris and the right wing had also been engaged.

As the 12th Foot moved forward on the right wing, a large body of Mysorean cavalry formed a wedge, with an elephant with a howdah on its back in front, and charged the regiment. The British line halted to receive the attack. Immediately afterward, two other very large bodies of the enemy were spotted in two tropes, preparing to support the first charge. Lieutenant-General Harris, recognising the danger, placed himself in the regiment's rear, frequently repeating the words, "Steady, Twelfth!" "Steady, old Twelfth!" When the wedge approached within a hundred yards, the Mysoreans discharged their carbines and pistols, but without much effect. When the Mysoreans came within about 30 yards (27 m), the regiment fired a well-directed volley with its muskets, followed by a rapid firing by file, inflicting many casualties on the enemy, creating a rampart of killed and wounded men and horses lying along the front of the regiment.

The rear of the wedge was hindered by the killed and wounded in front, and could not continue the charge. The elephant was severely wounded, its handler was dead, and the chief on his back had fallen. Turning around, the beast directed all its fury upon the Mysoreans, overturning everything in its path and creating great havoc with a prodigious chain which he swayed.

A few Mysorean horsemen broke through the regiment, but were instantly shot in its rear. The British artillery arrived and opened fire. The enemy cavalry fell back; at the same time, the line advanced, and decided the fate of the day on that part of the battlefield; a distant cannonade, however, indicated that the fighting was raging elsewhere.

== Aftermath ==
The following morning, the British army advanced and arrived before Seringapatam on 5 April 1799, and proceeded to lay siege to the city.
