= Mir Sadiq =

Minister of Tipu Sultan

Minister in the Cabinet
- In office 1780s/1790s–1799
- Monarch: Tipu Sultan

Personal details
- Died: 1799

Mir Sadiq was a courtier who held the post of a minister in the cabinet of Tipu Sultan of Mysore and is famous for his betrayal of Tipu Sultan to the British.

== Fourth Anglo-Mysore War ==
In the Fourth Anglo-Mysore War in 1798–99, he betrayed Tipu Sultan during the Siege of Srirangapatana, paving the way for a British victory. During the siege, although the invading English troops were starving, Sadiq withdrew his troops, allowing the British to commence their attack on the fort. He betrayed Tipu, killing Tipu loyalist, Ghazi Khan and later arranged to have Tipu trapped behind locked doors. Sadiq was killed by some of the dismayed Mysorean troops immediately following the defeat as he attempted to go over to welcome the British.

== Death and legacy ==
Following his death, Sadiq's body was mutilated, exhumed and defiled for over two weeks by the angered general public, including women and children, dismayed at his betrayal of Tipu Sultan, forcing the administration to impose "strong measures". Even today, tourists pelt the spot where Mir Sadiq was killed.

Mir Sadiq's mausoleum, also located in Srirangapatna, has regularly been assaulted by shoes thrown by visitors over the years. Presently, it is in a severe state of disrepair, rarely visited, and its lands have been encroached.

Muhammad Iqbal, the notable poet of Indian subcontinent, had condemned Mir Jafar and Mir Sadiq as follows:

جعفر از بنگال، و صادق از دکن
ننگِ آدم، ننگِ دین، ننگِ وطن

Translation:

Jafar of Bengal and Sadiq of the Deccan:
A stigma on humanity, on religion, and the country.

— Muhammad Iqbal

== See also ==
- Mir Jafar
- Mir Qasim
