= Belmont House and Gardens =

Coordinates: 51°16′18″N 0°50′43″E

Belmont House
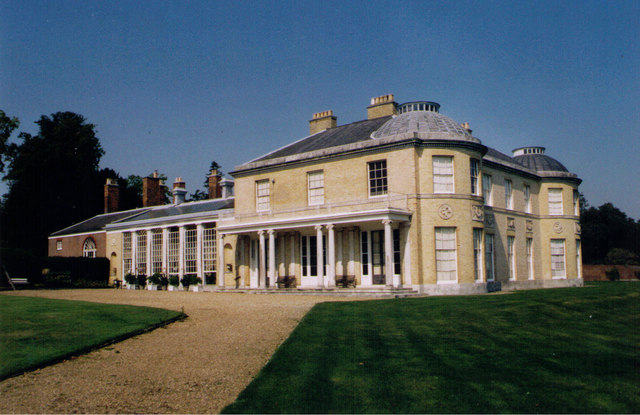
- Belmont House

General information
- Type: House
- Location: Throwley, near Faversham, Borough of Swale, Kent, England
- Estimated completion: Between 1769 and 1793
- Client: Edward Wilks, store-keeper at the nearby Faversham Powder Mill
- Owner: Harris family

Technical details
- Grounds: 14 acres including the house

Design and construction
- Architect: Samuel Wyatt

Website
- belmont-house.org

Belmont is a Grade-I-listed Georgian house and gardens (Note: Its 'park and garden' is listed at grade II, the lowest of the three possible grades.Historic England. "Details from listed building database (1000293)". National Heritage List for England.) in Throwley, near Faversham in east Kent. Built between 1769 and 1793, a travel book of 2004 cites it as "a marvellous example of Georgian architecture that has remained completely unspoilt". It holds the most extensive private collection of clocks in England. The house, garden and clock collection were featured in a March 2023 episode of BBC One's Antiques Roadshow.

== History ==
There was no house nor freehold of its own (for both its features) until the land was bought in 1769 by Edward Wilks, store-keeper of the Royal Powder Mills at Faversham. It was designed by the architect Samuel Wyatt. The original house stands as a wing of the present building. The current house was largely created between 1789–1793 by Colonel John Montresor of the Royal Engineers. His career was cut short when he was accused of embezzlement and the house was bought at auction in 1801 by General George Harris, 1st Baron Harris, for £9,000. His descendants continued to live at Belmont, the clock collection being assembled by the 5th Lord Harris, who served as the first President of the Antiquarian Horological Society. (Note: Jonathan Betts was as at 2020, the AHS's Curatorial Adviser.) The house has passed to a trust established by the Lord Harris alive in 2020.

== Gardens ==
The gardens cover just under 14 acres (5.7 ha) – a walled kitchen garden, pinetum, Victorian shell grotto and an orangery planted with orange trees, palms and other tropical trees. In 2001, the kitchen garden was restored under international designer Arabella Lennox-Boyd (born 1938). The Walnut Walk, with a line of formal pet graves leads to the Prospect Tower, originally used as a summerhouse; later as a pavilion by the 4th Lord Harris. (Note: The tower can be rented via the Landmark Trust.)
