= George Harris, 1st Baron Harris =

British Army officer

General The Right Honourable The Lord Harris GCB
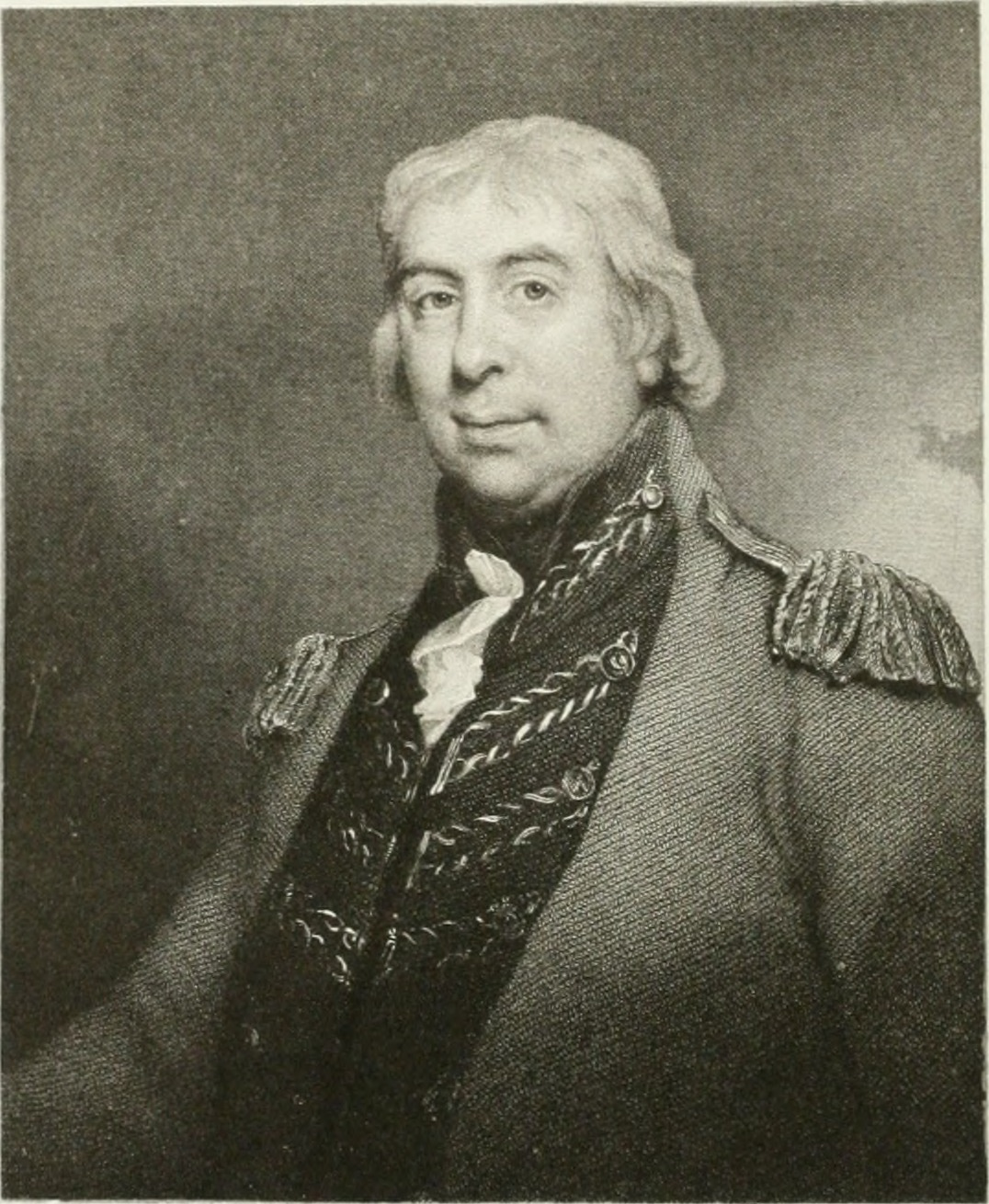
- Engraving by Thomas Anthony Dean
- Born: 18 March 1746; London, England
- Died: 19 May 1829 (aged 83); Belmont House, Kent
- Military career
- Allegiance: Great Britain; United Kingdom
- Branch: British Army
- Service years: 1760–1829
- Rank: General
- Commands: 5th Regiment of Foot; 76th Regiment of Foot; Madras Army
- Conflicts: American Revolutionary War; Battle of Lexington; Battle of Bunker Hill (WIA); Battle of Long Island; Battle of White Plains; Battle of Cooch's Bridge (WIA); Battle of Fort Washington; Battle of Brandywine; Battle of Monmouth; Battle of St. Lucia; Battle of Grenada; Third Anglo-Mysore War; Battle of Arakere; Siege of Seringapatam (1792); Fourth Anglo-Mysore War; Battle of Mallavelly; Siege of Seringapatam (1799)

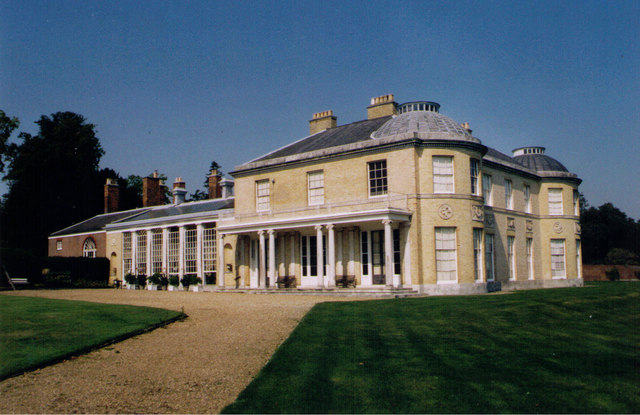
Belmont House, Throwley, Kent. The home of General Harris.

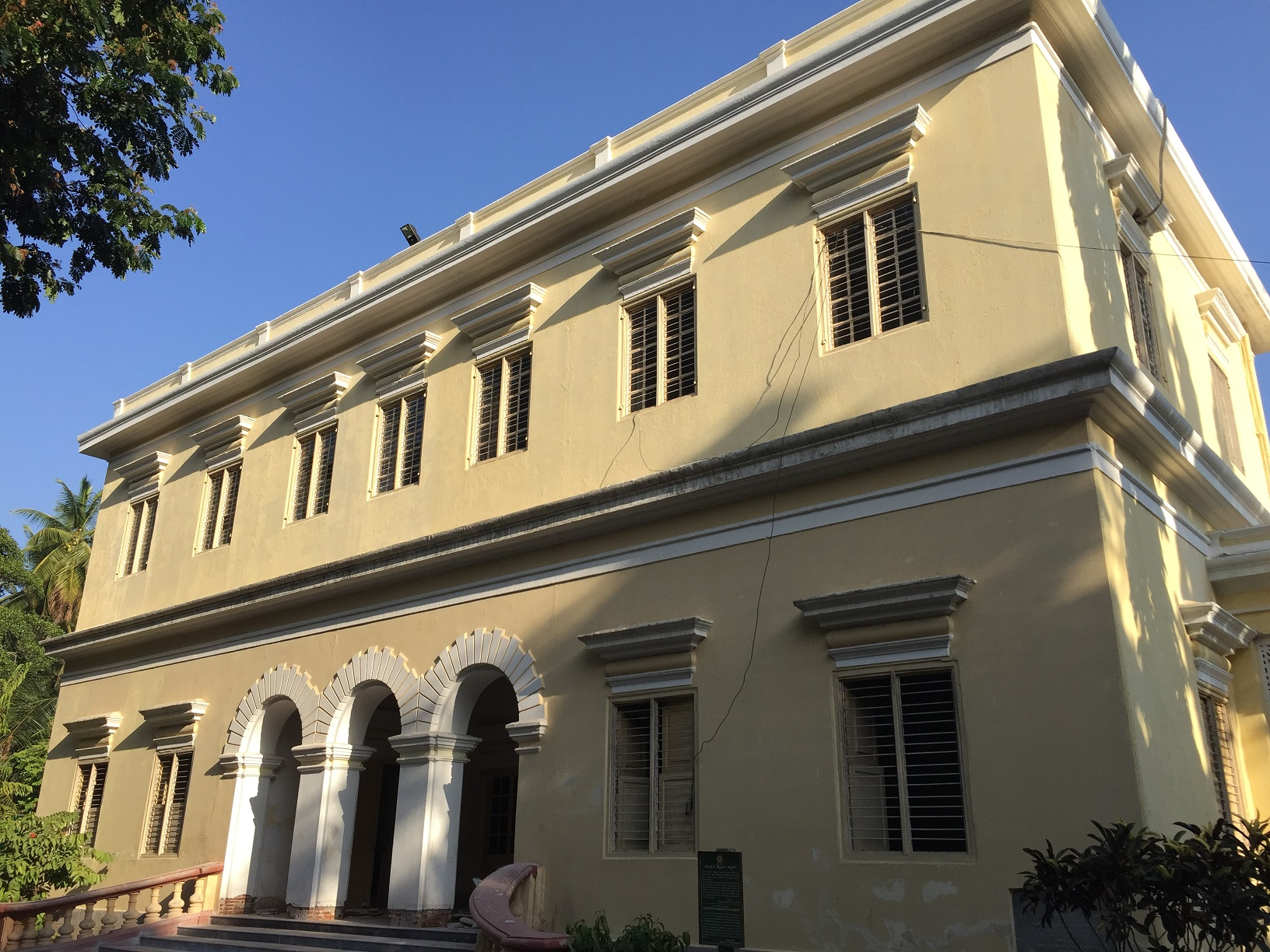
Lord Harris Residence, later residence of Purnaiah, Seringapatam

General George Harris, 1st Baron Harris, GCB (18 March 1746 – 19 May 1829) was a British Army officer.

== Military career ==
Harris was the son of the Reverend George Harris, curate of Brasted, Kent. He was educated at Westminster School and at the Royal Military Academy, Woolwich. He was commissioned to the Royal Artillery in 1760, transferring as an ensign in the 5th foot (Northumberland Fusiliers) in 1762. Three years later he became lieutenant, and in 1771 captain. His first active service was in the American War of Independence, in which he served at Lexington, Bunker Hill (where he was severely wounded) and in every engagement of Howe's army except one up to November 1778.

By this time he had obtained his majority, and his next service was under Major-General Medows at St. Lucia in 1778–1779, after which his regiment served as marines in Rodney's fleet. Later in 1779 he was for a time a prisoner of war. Shortly before his promotion to lieutenant-colonel in his regiment (1780) he married Anne Carteret Dickson. (Note: Anne Carteret Dickson (1758-30 July 1833), daughter of Charles Dickson. Her niece was Catherine Eliza Richardson (née Scott) and her nephew James Scott was ADC to General Harris at the Siege of Seringapatam. See Rootsweb WorldConnect: Anne Dickson, Catherine Eliza Scott, James Scott) After commanding the 5th in Ireland for some years, he exchanged and went with General Medows to Bombay, and served with that officer in India until 1792, taking part in various battles and engagements, notably Lord Cornwallis's attack on Seringapatam in the Third Anglo-Mysore War. In December 1787 he was on the muster roll of the 76th Regiment of Foot

In 1794, after a short period of home service, he was again in India. In the same year he became major-general, and in 1797 Commander-in-Chief of the Madras Army. Up to 1800 he commanded the troops in the presidency, and for a short time he exercised the civil government as well. In December 1798 he was appointed by Lord Mornington, the governor-general, to command the field army which was intended to attack Tipu Sultan, and in a few months of campaigning Harris reduced the Kingdom of Mysore and stormed the great stronghold of Seringapatam, where the Tipu died in its defence.

He received prize money of £100,000 for the Seringapatam campaign, his success establishing his reputation as a capable and experienced commander, with its political importance leading to his being offered the reward (which he declined) of an Irish peerage. He returned home in 1800, became lieutenant-general in the army the following year, and attained the rank of full general in 1812. He bought Belmont House near Faversham in 1801. In 1809 he was commissioned as Lieutenant-Colonel Commandant of the part-time 2nd East Kent or Lath of Scray and Wingham Regiment of Local Militia.

In 1815 he was made a peer of the United Kingdom under the title Baron Harris, of Seringapatam and Mysore and of Belmont in the County of Kent. In 1820 he was appointed GCB, and in 1824 was made governor of Dumbarton Castle. He was colonel of the 73rd (Highland) Regiment of Foot from 1800 to his death.

Lord Harris died at Belmont in May 1829, he was succeeded in the barony by his son William. His descendant, the 4th Baron Harris (b. 1851), best known as a cricketer, was Under-Secretary for India (1885–1886), Under-Secretary for war (1886–1889) and Governor of Bombay (1890–1895).

== Arms ==
Coat of arms of George Harris, 1st Baron Harris

Crest
On a mural crown Or a royal tiger passant-guardant Vert striped Or spotted of the first pierced in the breast with an arrow of the last vulned Gules charged on the forehead with a Persian character for Ryder and crowned with an Eastern coronet both of the first.
Escutcheon
Vert on a chevron embattled, erminois between three hedgehogs Or, as many bombs Sable fired Proper a chief of augmentation thereon the gates and fortress of Seringapatam the draw-bridge let down and the Union flag of Great Britain and Ireland hoisted over the standard of Tippoo Sahib all Proper.
Supporters
Dexter a Grenadier soldier of the 73rd Regiment in his regimentals Proper supporting with his exterior hand a staff thereon hoisted the union flag of Great Britain and Ireland over that of the standard of Tippoo Sahib and beneath the tri-coloured flag entwined, inscribed with the word "Republique"; sinister a Malay soldier in his uniform Proper supporting a like staff thereon hoisted the flag of the East India Company Argent striped barwise Gules with a canton, over the standard of Tippoo Sahib with the tri-coloured flag entwined beneath as on the dexter inscribed with the word "Francaise" all Proper.
Motto
My Prince and My Country.

== Notes ==
Military offices
Preceded by Alured Clarke	C-in-C, Madras Army; 1797–1800	Succeeded by John Braithwaite
Preceded by Gerard Lake, 1st Viscount Lake	Colonel of the 73rd Regiment of Foot; 1800–1829	Succeeded by Sir Frederick Adam
Peerage of the United Kingdom
New creation	Baron Harris; 1815–1829	Succeeded by William George Harris
