= Fourth Anglo-Mysore War =

1798–99 conflict in the Kingdom of Mysore

- Part of the Anglo-Mysore Wars and the War of the Second Coalition
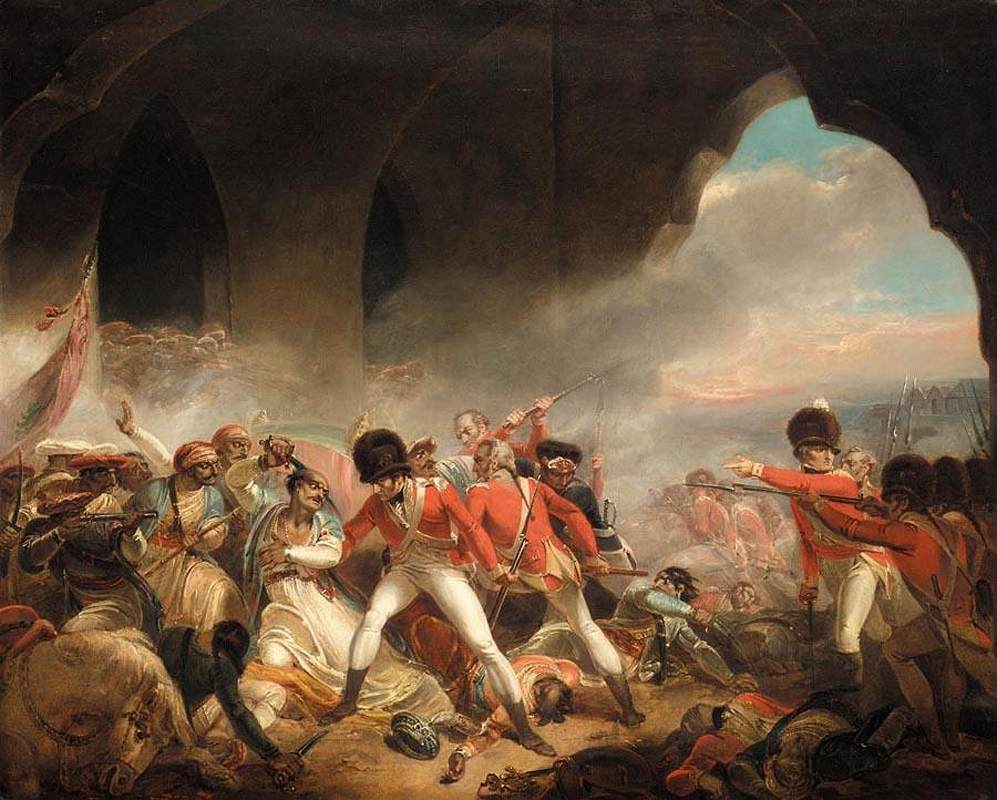
- The Last Effort and Fall of Tippoo Sultan, by Henry Singleton displaying the Siege of Seringapatam
Date	1798 – 4 May 1799
Location	Western Deccan region, South India, Indian subcontinent
Result	British victory

Belligerents
Kingdom of Mysore; France	East India Company Maratha Empire: Hyderabad (Note: Hyderabad State was under the suzerainty of the Peshwa)

Commanders and leaders
Tipu Sultan †; Purnaiah; Ghulam Khan; Sipahsalar Sahib; Mir Hussain; Mohomed Miran; (French First Republic) Louis Chapuis (surrendered)	(East India Company) George Harris; (East India Company) David Baird; (East India Company) James Stuart; (East India Company) James Dalrymple; Arthur Wellesley (WIA); Shahu II; Bajirao II; Nana Fadnavis; (Hyderabad State) Asaf Jah II; (Hyderabad State) Mir Alam; (Hyderabad State) Renuka Bhalerao; Mir Sadiq †

Strength
c. 37,000	(East India Company) 60,000 (supportive alliance): (Hyderabad State) 10,480

The Fourth Anglo-Mysore War was a conflict in South India during which the Mysore State fought against the East India Company, Maratha Empire and the Hyderabad State (under the suzerainty of Marathas) in 1798–99.

This was the last of the Anglo-Mysore Wars. Although the Marathas had promised the land of Uttara Kannada to Mysore, they sided with the Company at the last moment which led to the capture of the capital city Mysore by the Company and the death of the ruler Tipu Sultan in the battle. Britain took indirect control of Mysore, restoring the Wadiyar dynasty to power (with a British commissioner to advise him on all issues), along with the Marathas. Tipu Sultan's young heir, Fateh Ali, was sent into exile. The Kingdom of Mysore became a princely state in a subsidiary alliance with the East India Company covering parts of present day Kerala–Karnataka; and ceded Coimbatore and Dakshina Kannada to the British.

== Background ==
Napoleon Bonaparte's landing in Ottoman Egypt in 1798 was intended to further the capture of the British possessions in India, and the Kingdom of Mysore was a key to that next step, as the ruler of Mysore, Tipu Sultan, sought France as an ally and his letter to Napoleon resulted in the following reply, "You have already been informed of my arrival on the borders of the Red Sea, with an innumerable and invincible army, full of the desire of releasing and relieving you from the iron yoke of England." Additionally, General Malartic, French Governor of Mauritius, issued the Malartic Proclamation seeking volunteers to assist Tipu. Some 500 men were sent to India from Mauritius and were led by Brigadier Louis Auguste Chapuis. They awaited for the main French force to come via the middle East when they invaded in 1798.

Horatio Nelson ended any possibility of help from Napoleon after the Battle of the Nile. However, Lord Mornington had already set in motion a response to prevent any alliance between Tipu Sultan and France. Maratha leadership under Peshwa Baji Rao II and Nana Fadnavis maintained a position of strategic neutrality throughout the 1799 campaign. Despite this lack of active combat participation, the British utilized the alliance to isolate Tipu Sultan diplomatically.

== Invasion and British victory ==
Three armies, one from Bombay and two British (one of which contained a division that was commanded by Colonel Arthur Wellesley, the future 1st Duke of Wellington), marched into Mysore in 1799 and besieged the capital, Srirangapatnam, after some engagements with Tipu. On 6 March, a forward force managed to hold off an advance by Tipu at the Battle of Seedaseer.

One notable military advance championed by Tipu Sultan was the use of mass attacks with iron-cased rocket brigades in the army. The effect of the Mysorean rockets on the British during the Third and Fourth Mysore Wars was sufficiently impressive to inspire William Congreve to develop the Congreve rockets for Napoleonic Wars.

During the war, rockets were used on several occasions. One of these involved Colonel Wellesley. At the Battle of Sultanpet Tope, Wellesley's assault on the first day was soundly repulsed by Tipu's Diwan, Purnaiah. Quoting Forrest,

At this point (near the village of Sultanpet, Figure 5) there was a large tope, or grove, which gave shelter to Tipu's rocketmen and had obviously to be cleaned out before the siege could be pressed closer to Srirangapattana island. The commander chosen for this operation was Col. Wellesley, but advancing towards the tope after dark on the 5 April 1799, he was set upon with rockets and musket-fires, lost his way and, as Beatson politely puts it, had to "postpone the attack" until a more favourable opportunity should offer.

The following day, Wellesley launched a fresh attack with a larger force, and took the whole position without losing a single man. On 22 April 1799, twelve days before the main battle, rocketeers worked their way around to the rear of the British encampment, then "threw a great number of rockets at the same instant" to signal the beginning of an assault by 6,000 Indian infantry and a corps of Frenchmen, all directed by Mir Golam Hussain and Mohomed Hulleen Mir Miran. The rockets had a range of about 1,000 yards. Some burst in the air like shells. Others, called ground rockets, would rise again on striking the ground and bound along in a serpentine motion until their force was spent. According to one British observer, a young English officer named Bayly: "So pestered were we with the rocket boys that there was no moving without danger from the destructive missiles ...". He continued:

The rockets and musketry from 20,000 of the enemy were incessant. No hail could be thicker. Every illumination of blue lights was accompanied by a shower of rockets, some of which entered the head of the column, passing through to the rear, causing death, wounds, and dreadful lacerations from the long bamboos of twenty or thirty feet which are invariably attached to them.

During the decisive British attack on Seringapatam on 2 May 1799, with the help of Marathas and the Nizam, a British shot struck a magazine of rockets within Tipu Sultan's fort, causing it to explode and send a towering cloud of black smoke with cascades of exploding white light rising up from the battlements. On the afternoon of 4 May, when the final attack on the fort was led by Sir David Baird, he was met by "furious musket and rocket fire", but this did not help much; in about an hour's time, the fort was taken; perhaps within another hour Tipu had been shot (the precise time of his death is not known), and the war was effectively over. When the British were on the verge of victory, the French allies reportedly told Tipu to flee, but Tipu refused and famously said "Better to live one day as a tiger than a thousand years as a sheep". The death of Tipu Sultan led British General George Harris to exclaim "now India is ours".

== Aftermath ==
The victors, rather than partitioning the country, forced Tipu's family into exile and restored control of Mysore to the Wadiyars.

Many members of the East India Company believed that Umdat ul-Umara, the Nawab of Carnatic, secretly provided assistance to Tipu Sultan during the Fourth Anglo-Mysore War; and they immediately sought his deposition after the end of the conflict.

The territory of the Nawab of Savanur was split among the British and Maratha forces.

The spot where Tipu's body was discovered under the eastern gate has been fenced off by the Archaeological Survey of India, and a plaque erected. The gate was later demolished during the 19th century to lay a wide road. After Tipu Sultan was defeated and killed, the British offered a portion of the conquered Mysore territory to the Marathas as a gesture of "goodwill" for their technical alliance. However, the Marathas rejected the offer because it came with the condition that they accept a British Resident at their court and a British subsidiary force.

== In popular culture ==
The war, specifically the Battle of Mallavelly and the siege of Seringapatam, with many of the key protagonists, is covered in the historical novel Sharpe's Tiger by Bernard Cornwell.

== Gallery ==
Fall of Tipu Sultan (1799)

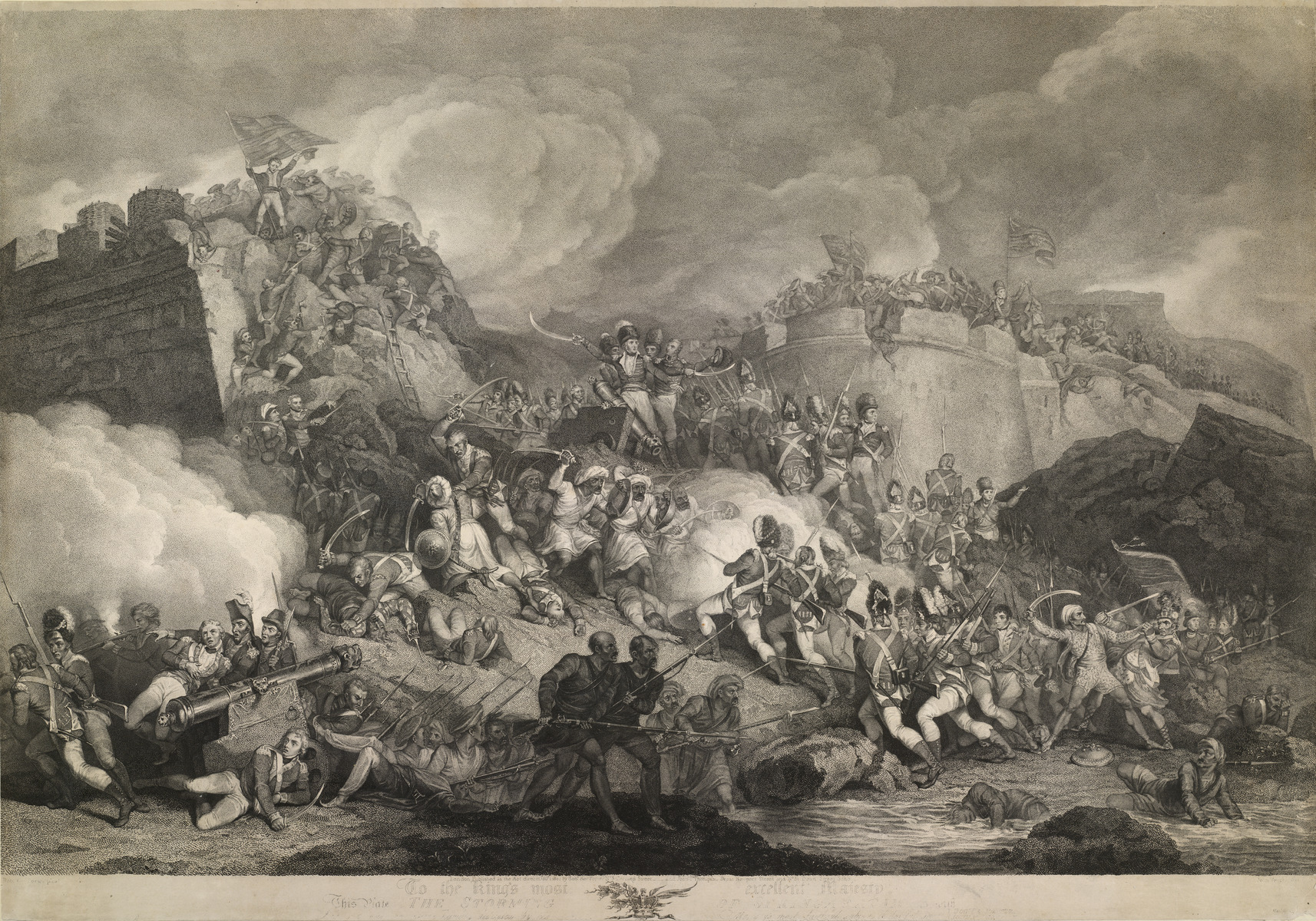
The Storming of Seringapatam by Giovanni Vendramini, 1802

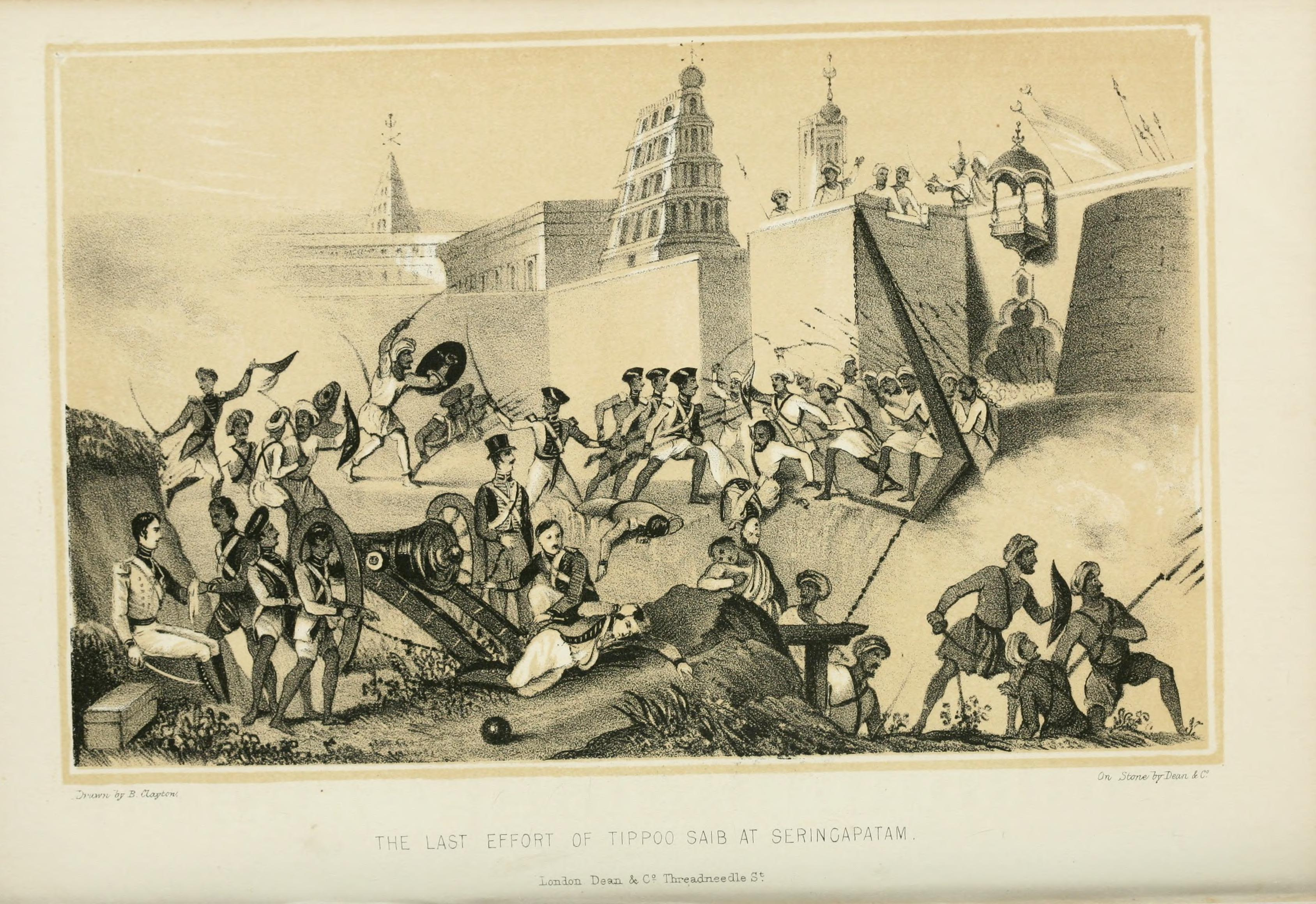
The Last Effort of Tippoo Saib at Seringapatam by B. Clayton, 1840

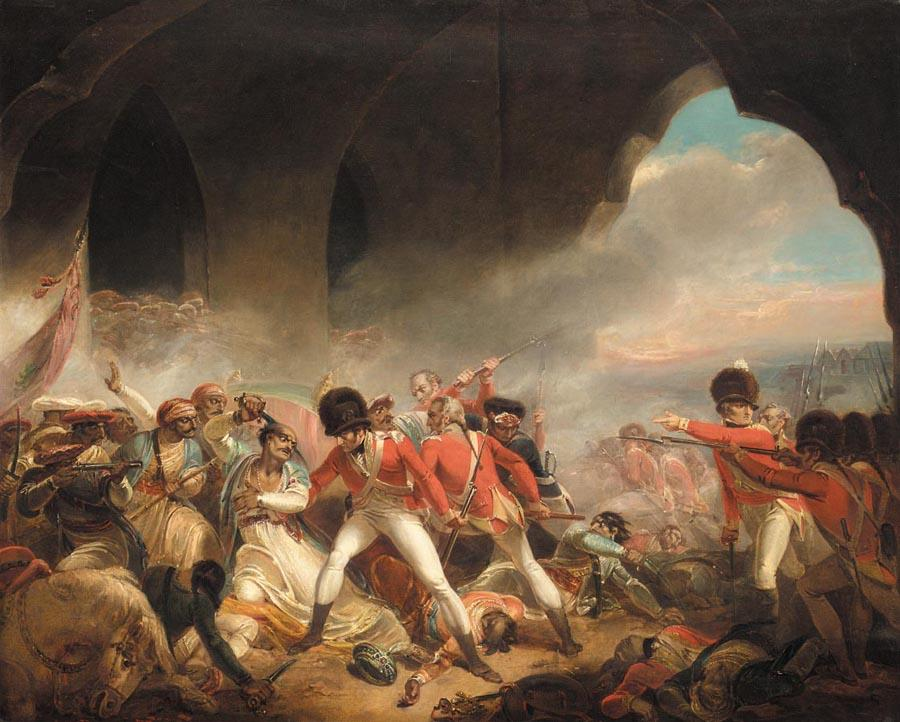
The Last Effort and Fall of Tippoo Sultaun by Henry Singleton, c. 1800

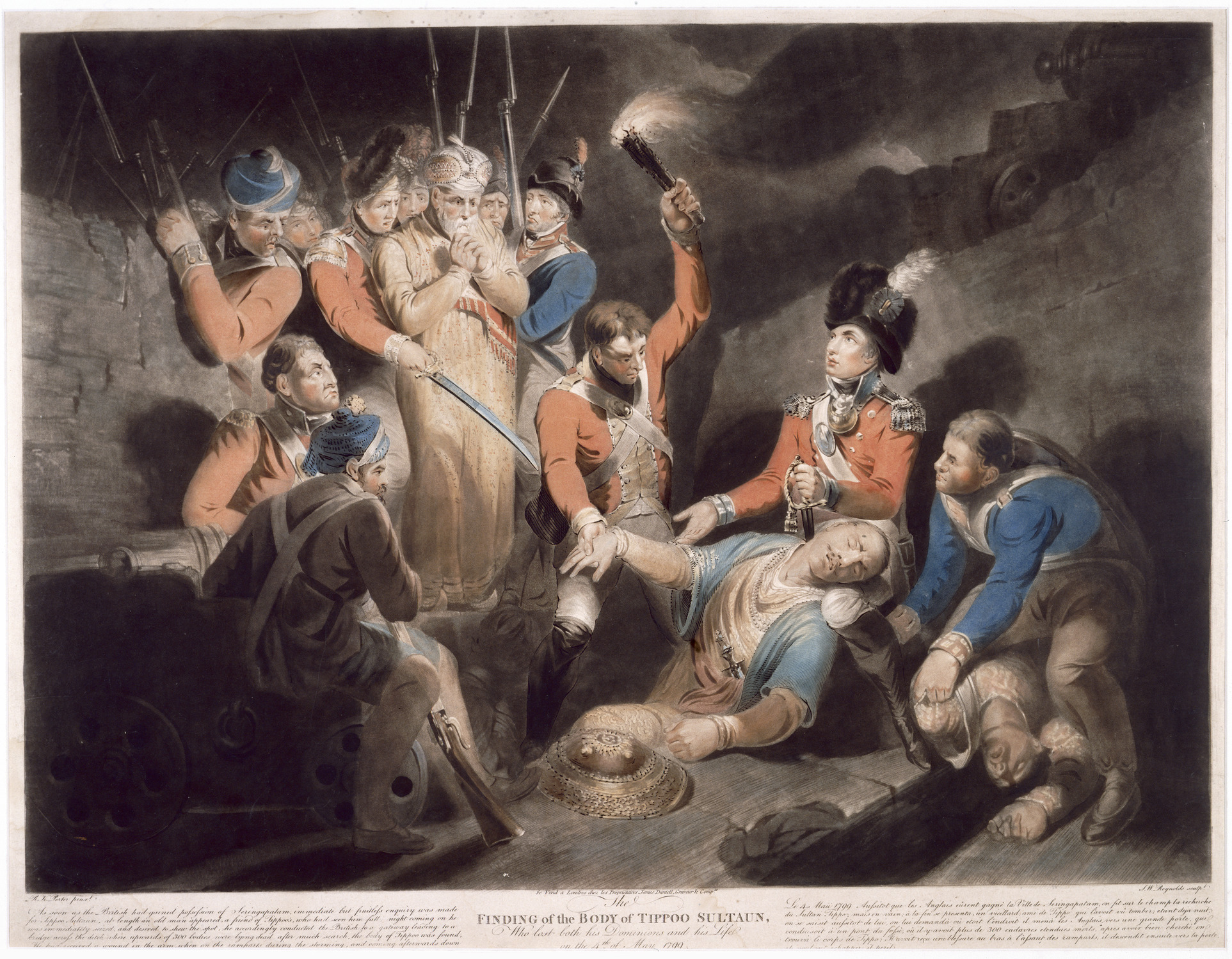
Finding of the Body of Tippoo Sultaun by Samuel William Reynolds, 1800

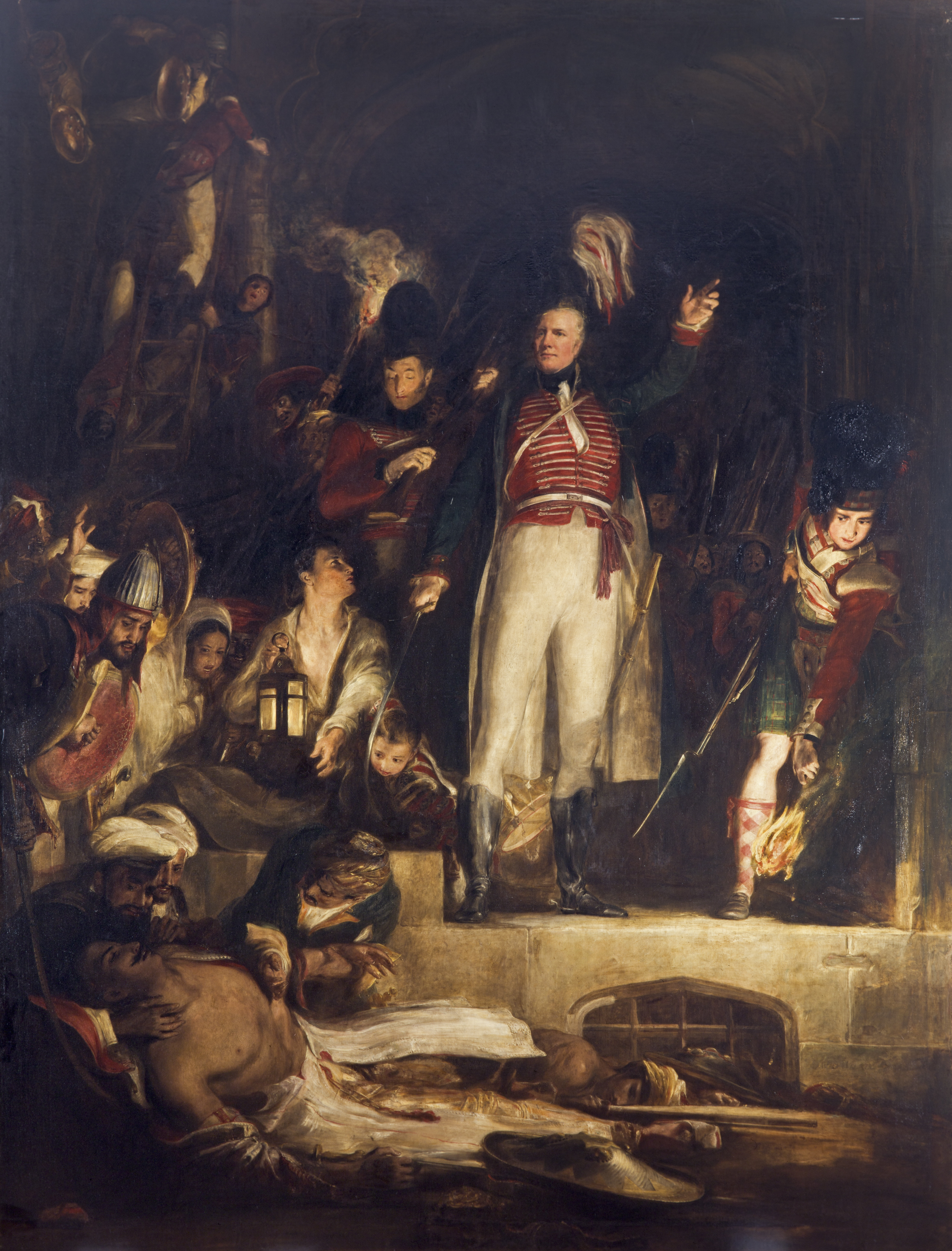
Sir David Baird Discovering the Body of Sultan Tipoo Sahib by David Wilkie, 1839

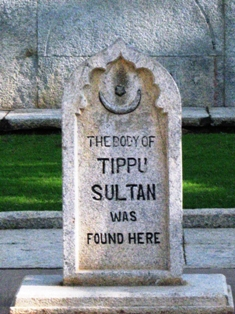
British Marker showing the location where Tipu's body was found

== Notes ==
Preceded by Third Anglo-Mysore War	Anglo-Mysore Wars	Succeeded by None
Preceded by Third Anglo-Mysore War	Indo-British conflicts	Succeeded by Second Anglo-Maratha War
