= Sir David Baird Discovering the Body of Sultan Tipoo Sahib =

Painting by David Wilkie

Sir David Baird Discovering the Body of Sultan Tippoo Sahib
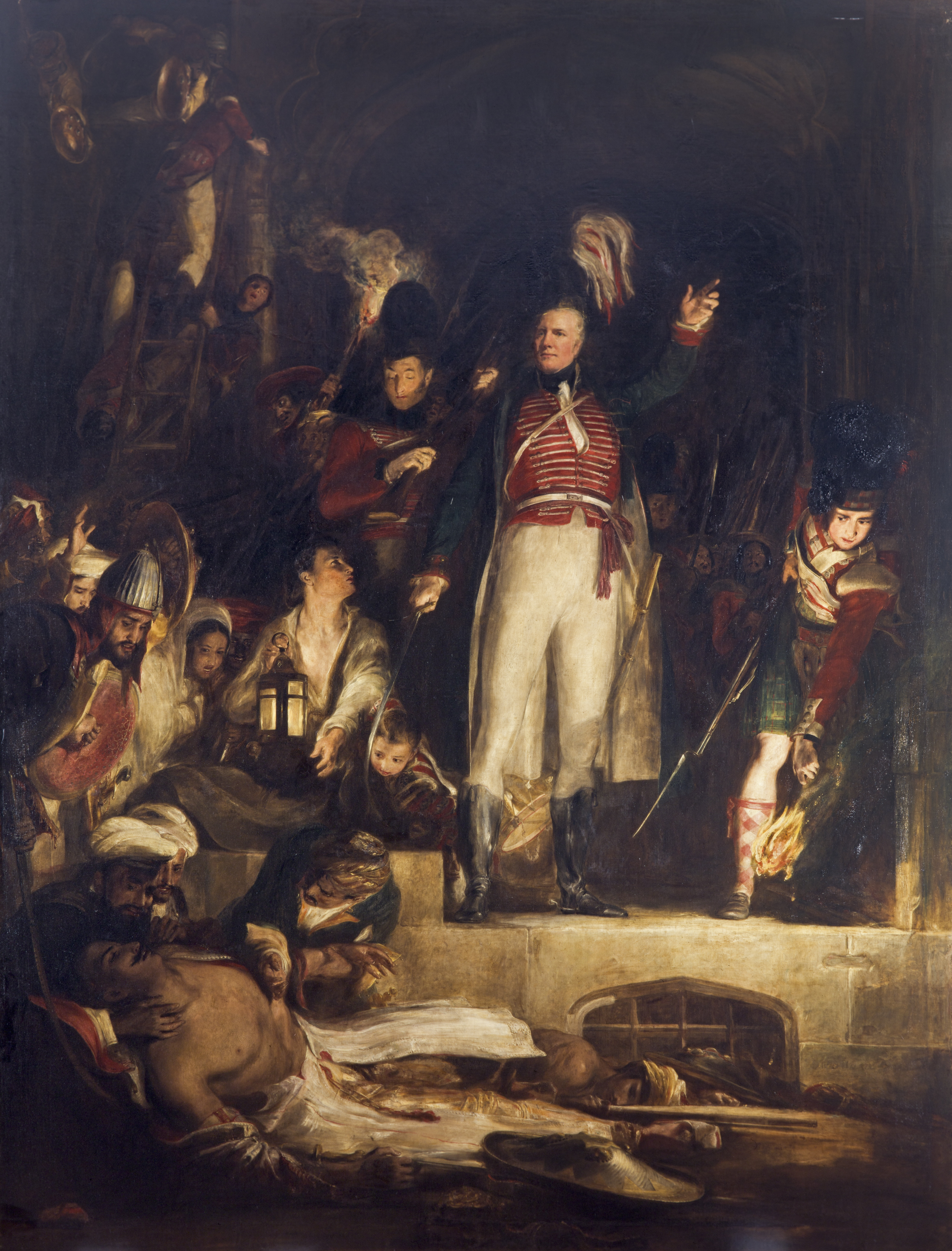
- Artist: David Wilkie
- Year: 1839
- Type: Oil on canvas, history painting
- Dimensions: 348.5 cm × 267.9 cm (137.2 in × 105.5 in)
- Location: Scottish National Gallery, Edinburgh

Sir David Baird Discovering the Body of Sultan Tippoo Sahib is an 1839 history painting by the Scottish artist David Wilkie. It is held at the Scottish National Gallery, in Edinburgh.

== History and description ==
It presents a scene during the Siege of Seringapatam in 1799. General Sir David Baird, a senior British officer and accompanying troops encounter the body of the Tipu Sultan. The ruler of Mysore and an ally of France he was killed when Anglo-Indian forces stormed his capital Seringapatam.

It has been described as the artist's "last and largest major work". The depiction of General Baird was posthumous as he had retired from active service after the 1809 Battle of Corunna and died in 1829. It was commissioned by his widow Anne. Wilkie based his image of the general on a portrait of him by Henry Raeburn. It was displayed at the Royal Academy's 1839 Summer Exhibition. It is today in the collection of the National Galleries of Scotland, having been acquired in 1985.

The battle in which this scene occurs is also the opening of the novel The Moonstone, by Wilkie Collins. The author was named after David Wilkie, who was his godfather.

== Bibliography ==
- Tromans, Nicholas. David Wilkie: The People's Painter. Edinburgh University Press, 2007.
