= Siege of Seringapatam (1799) =

Mysorean-British battle

- Part of the Fourth Anglo-Mysore War
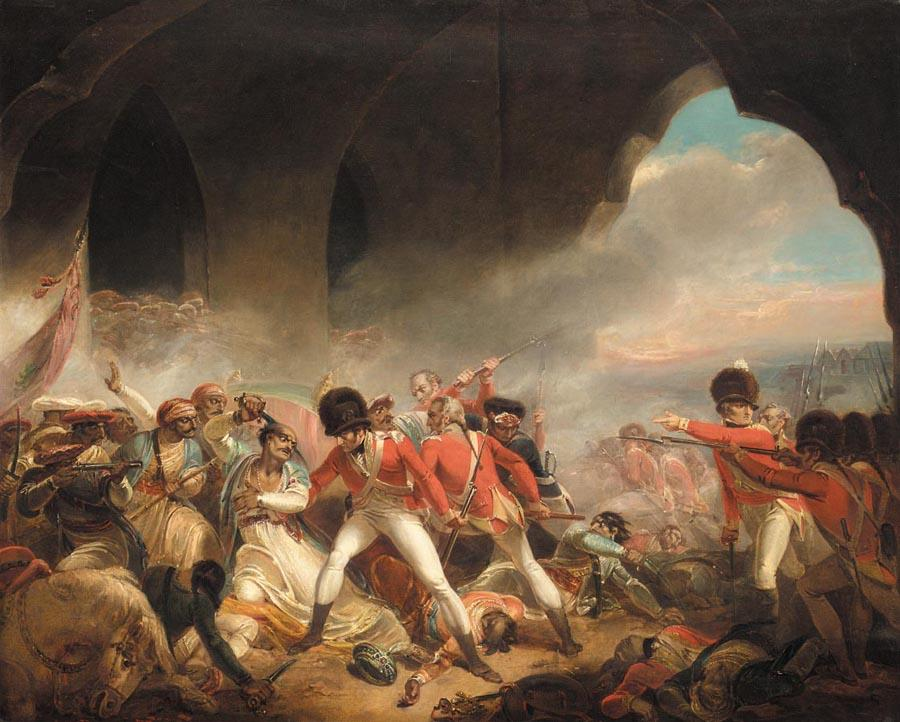
- The Last Effort and Fall of Tippoo Sultaun (c. 1800)
Date	5 April – 4 May 1799 (4 weeks and 1 day)
Location	Srirangapatam, Kingdom of Mysore 12°25′26.3″N 76°41′25.04″E
Result	British victory: Fall of the Mysore Kingdom

Belligerents
East India Company; Hyderabad	Mysore; France

Commanders and leaders
George Harris; David Baird; Arthur Wellesley; Nizam Ali Khan	Tipu Sultan †; Purnaiah; Abdul Sahib †; Mir Hussain; Mohomed Hulleen (French First Republic) Louis Chapuis (surrendered)

Strength
50,000 total 22,000 Sepoys 4,000 Europeans 16,000 Nizam's horsemen 10 battalions of Hyderabadi infantry (~8,000) 100–120 guns	20,000 soldiers 10,000 volunteers

Casualties and losses
1,400 killed or wounded	6,000 to 10,000 killed

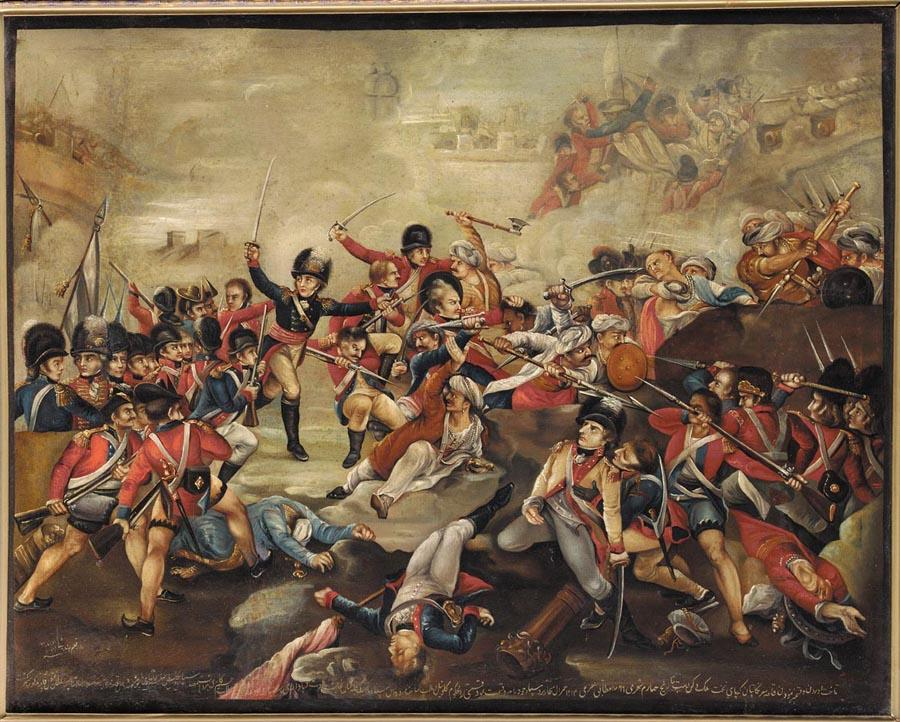
A Qajar Persian copy of a British painting of the assault

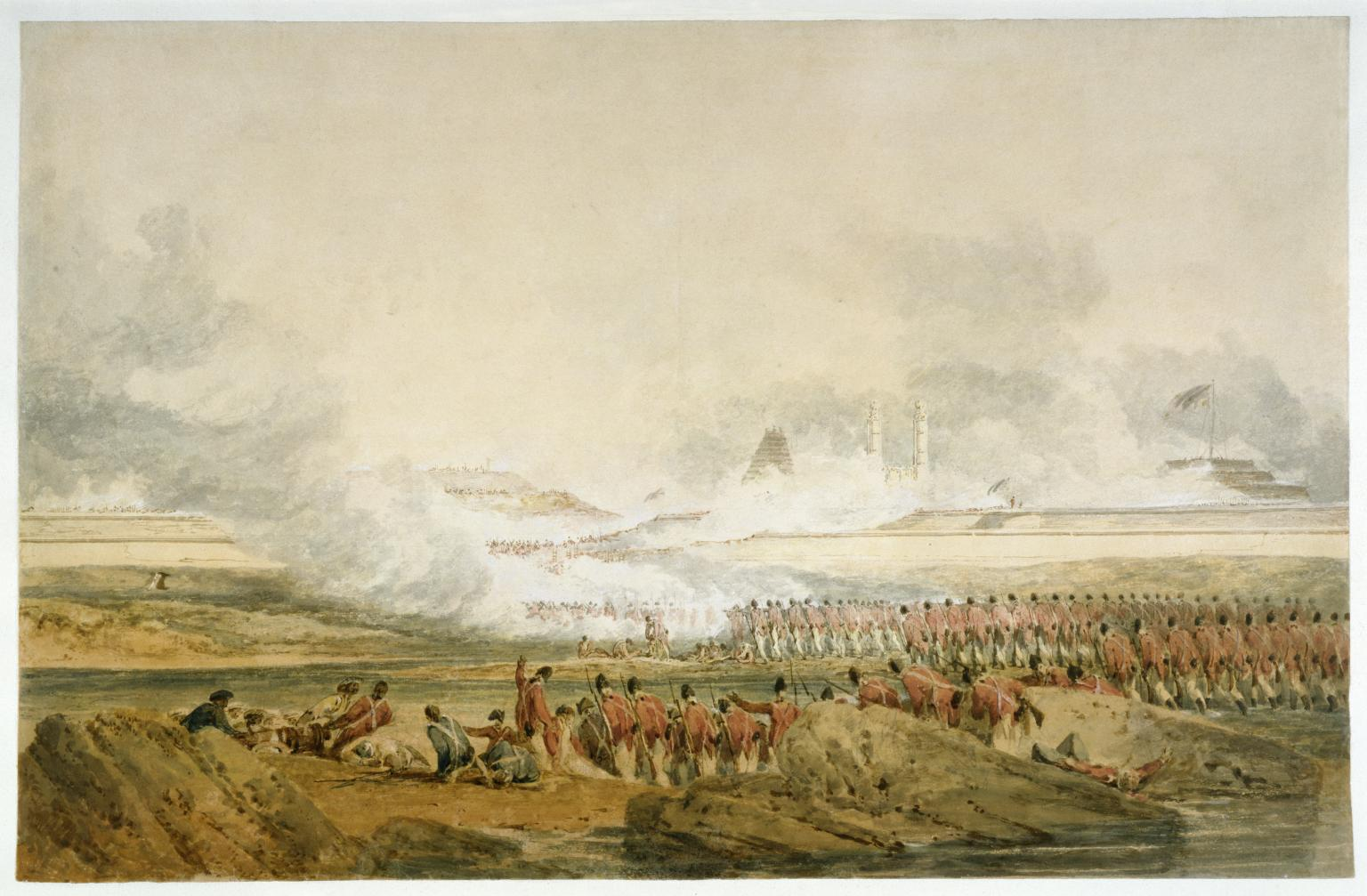
The Siege of Seringapatam by Joseph Mallord William Turner

The siege of Seringapatam (5 April – 4 May 1799) was the final confrontation of the Fourth Anglo-Mysore War between the British East India Company and the Kingdom of Mysore led by Tipu Sultan who ruled after the death of his father. The British, with the allied Nizam Ali Khan, 2nd Nizam of Hyderabad and Maratha Empire, achieved a decisive victory after breaching the walls of the fortress at Seringapatam and storming the citadel.

The war came to an end with the defeat and death of Tipu Sultan in the battle. The British restored the Wadiyar dynasty back to power after the victory through a treaty of subsidiary alliance and Krishnaraja Wodeyar III was crowned the King of Mysore. However, they retained indirect control (British paramountcy) of the kingdom's external affairs.

== Background ==
When the Fourth Anglo-Mysore War broke out, the British assembled two large columns under General George Harris. The first consisted of over 26,000 British East India Company troops, 4,000 of whom were European while the rest were local Indian sepoys. The second column was supplied by the Nizam of Hyderabad, and consisted of ten battalions and over 16,000 cavalry. Together, the allied force numbered over 50,000 soldiers. The overall commander was Major General David Baird, among the lesser known allies were the Portuguese in Goa and Damaon.

Tipu's forces had been depleted by the Third Anglo-Mysore War and the consequent loss of half his kingdom, but he still probably had up to 30,000 soldiers. In addition to this there was a French contingent sent by the French government to support the French invasion of the Middle East which had taken place the year before. The contingent was under the command of Brigadier Louis Auguste Chapuis, who had arrived with him some ninety-eight officers and soldiers from Mauritius bringing the total to around 450 men.

The British forces consisted of the following:

- 19th Light Dragoons
- 25th Dragoons
- 12th Suffolk Regiment
- 33rd (1st Yorkshire West Riding) Regiment of Foot
- 73rd (Highland) Regiment of Foot
- 74th (Highland) Regiment of Foot
- 75th (Highland) Regiment of Foot
- 77th Regiment of Foot
- Scotch Brigade [later 94th Regiment of Foot]
- Regiment de Meuron (Swiss mercenaries in British pay)

The Indian (sepoy) forces consisted of the following:

- 1st Madras Native Infantry
- 2nd Madras Native Infantry
- 1st Madras Native Cavalry
- 2nd Madras Native Cavalry
- 3rd Madras Native Cavalry
- 4th Madras Native Cavalry
- Madras Pioneers
- Madras Artillery
- 1st Bengal Native Infantry
- 2nd Bengal Native Infantry
- Bengal Artillery
- 71st Coorg Rifles

== Siege ==
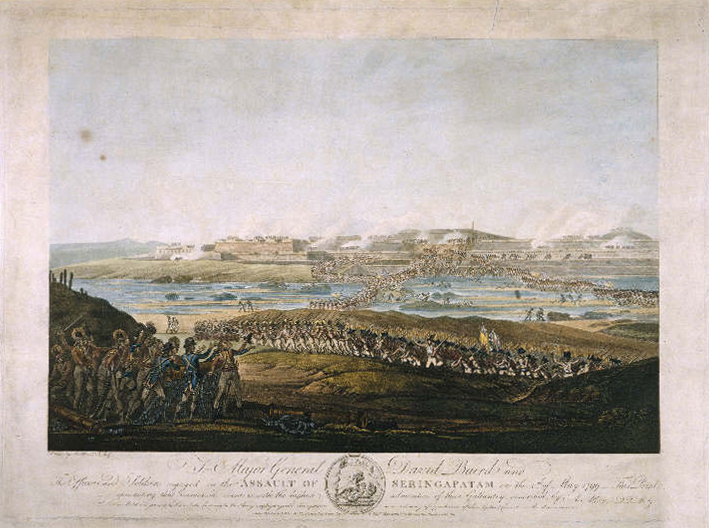
The assault of Seringapatam

Seringapatam was besieged by the British forces on 5 April 1799. The River Cauvery, which flowed around the city of Seringapatam, was at its lowest level of the year and could be forded by infantry, if an assault commenced before the monsoon. When letters were exchanged with Tipu, it seemed that he was playing for time. He requested two persons to be sent to him for discussions and also stated that he was preoccupied with hunting expeditions. Tipu Sultan's Chief Minister, Mir Sadiq, is alleged to have been bought over by the British.

=== The breach ===
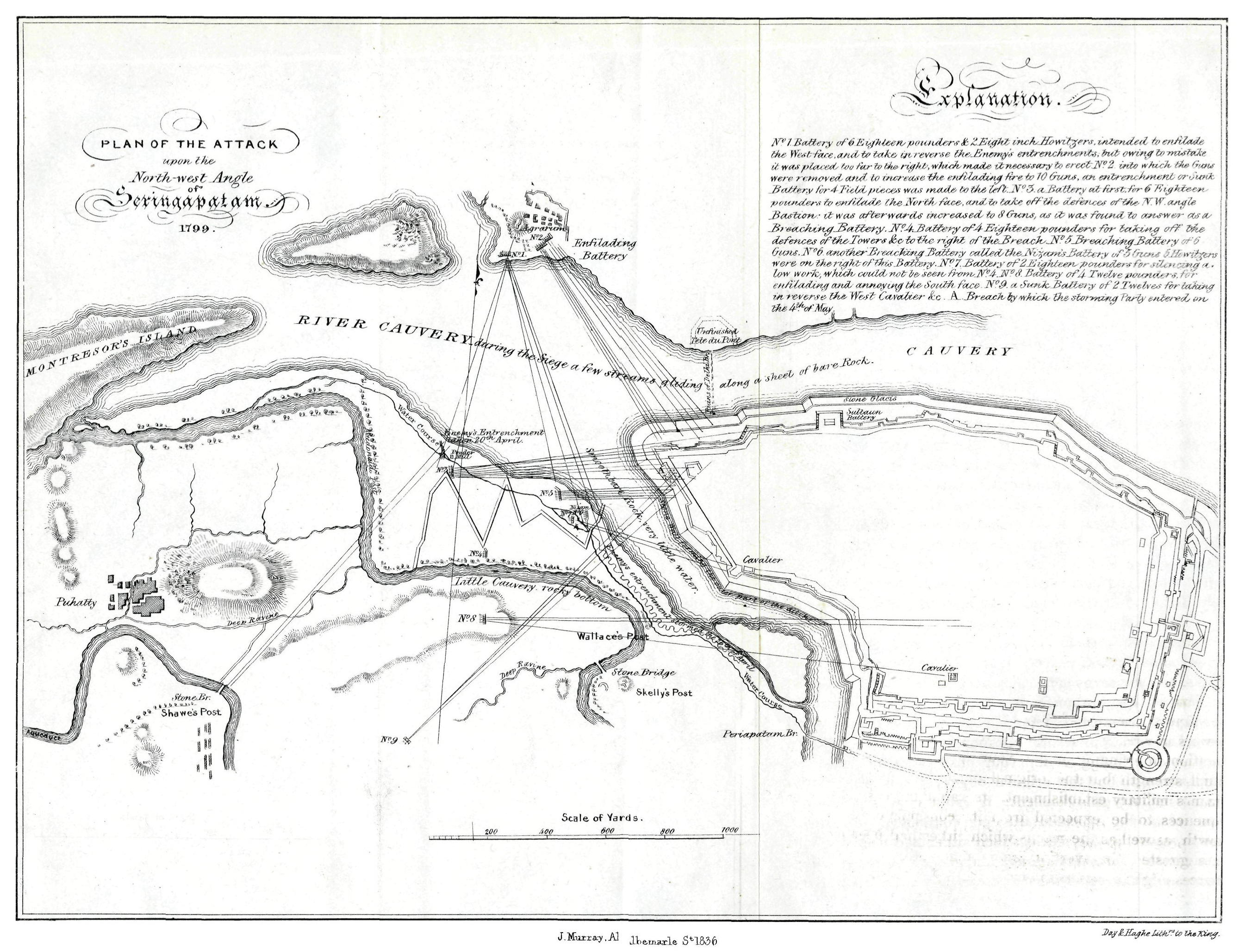
Plan of the attack on the north-west angle of Seringapatam

The Governor-General of India, Richard Wellesley, planned the opening of a breach in the walls of Seringapatam. The location of the breach, as noted by Beatson, the author of an account of the Fourth Mysore War, was 'in the west curtain, a little to the right of the flank of the north-west bastion. This being the old rampart appeared weaker than the new.' The Mysorean defence succeeded in preventing the establishment of a battery on the north side of the River Cauvery on 22 April 1799. However, by 1 May, working at night, the British had completed their southern batteries and brought them up to the wall. At sunrise on 2 May, the batteries of the 2nd Nizam of Hyderabad succeeded in opening a practical breach in the outer wall. In addition, the mines that were laid under the breach were hit by artillery and blew up prematurely.

The leader of the British troops was Major General David Baird, an implacable enemy of Tipu Sultan: twenty years earlier, he had been held captive for 44 months. The storming troops, including men of the 73rd and 74th regiments, clambered up the breach and fought their way along the ramparts.

On the night of 3 May some officers crossed over to the glacis, examined the breach and the manner of attacking the fort. It was probably on this occasion that it was arranged between the English officers and Mir Sadiq that the assault should take place at midday.

=== Storming of Seringapatam ===
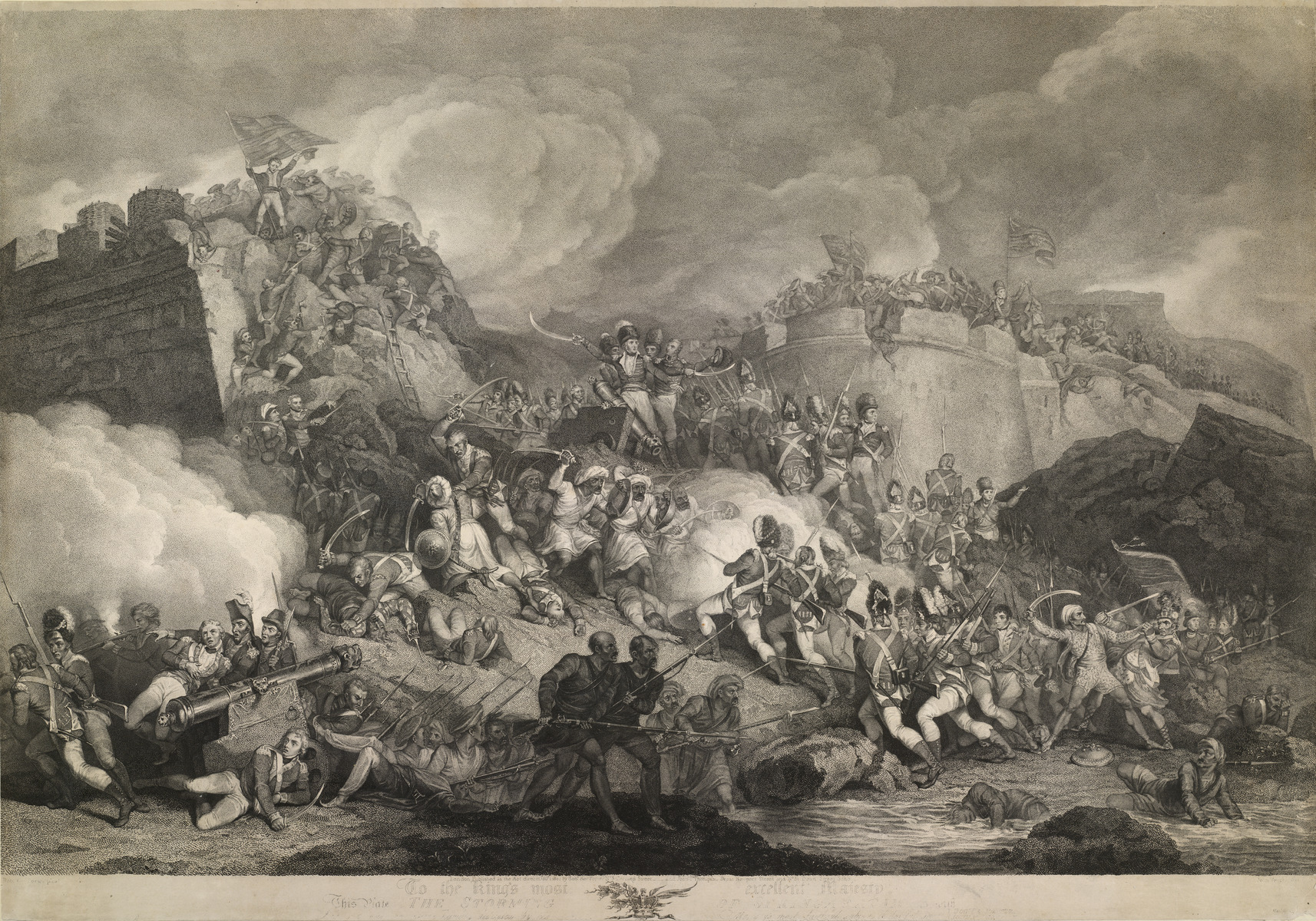
The storming of Seringapatam, John Vendramini, 1802

The assault was to begin at 1:00 p.m. to coincide with the hottest part of the day when the defenders would be taking refreshment. Led by two forlorn hopes, two columns would advance upon the defences around the breach, then wheel right and left to take over the fortifications. A third reserve column, commanded by Arthur Wellesley, would deploy as required to provide support where needed.

At 11:00 a.m., on 4 May 1799, the British troops were briefed and whisky and a biscuit issued to the European soldiers, before the signal to attack was given. The forlorn-hopes, numbering seventy-six men, led the charge. The columns quickly formed, were ordered to fix bayonets, and began to move forward.

As the hour approached, Mir Sadiq withdrew the troops stationed at the breach under the pretext of distributing their pay. There was no one to protest against such a measure. Sayyid Abdul Ghaffar, who was very loyal to the Sultan, was killed by a cannon ball. Immediately after the Sayyid was killed, the traitors made a signal from the fort holding out a white handkerchief to the English troops who were assembled in the trenches, waiting for such a signal.

The storming party dashed across the River Cauvery in water four feet deep, with covering fire from British batteries, and within 16 minutes had scaled the ramparts and swept aside the defenders quickly. The British follow-up columns turned right and left, sweeping along the inside of the walls until they met on the far side of the city. A number of French attempted to make a rally at the Southern rampart but to no avail. They were trapped and were forced to surrender which included ten officers and Chapuis himself.

=== Death of Tipu ===
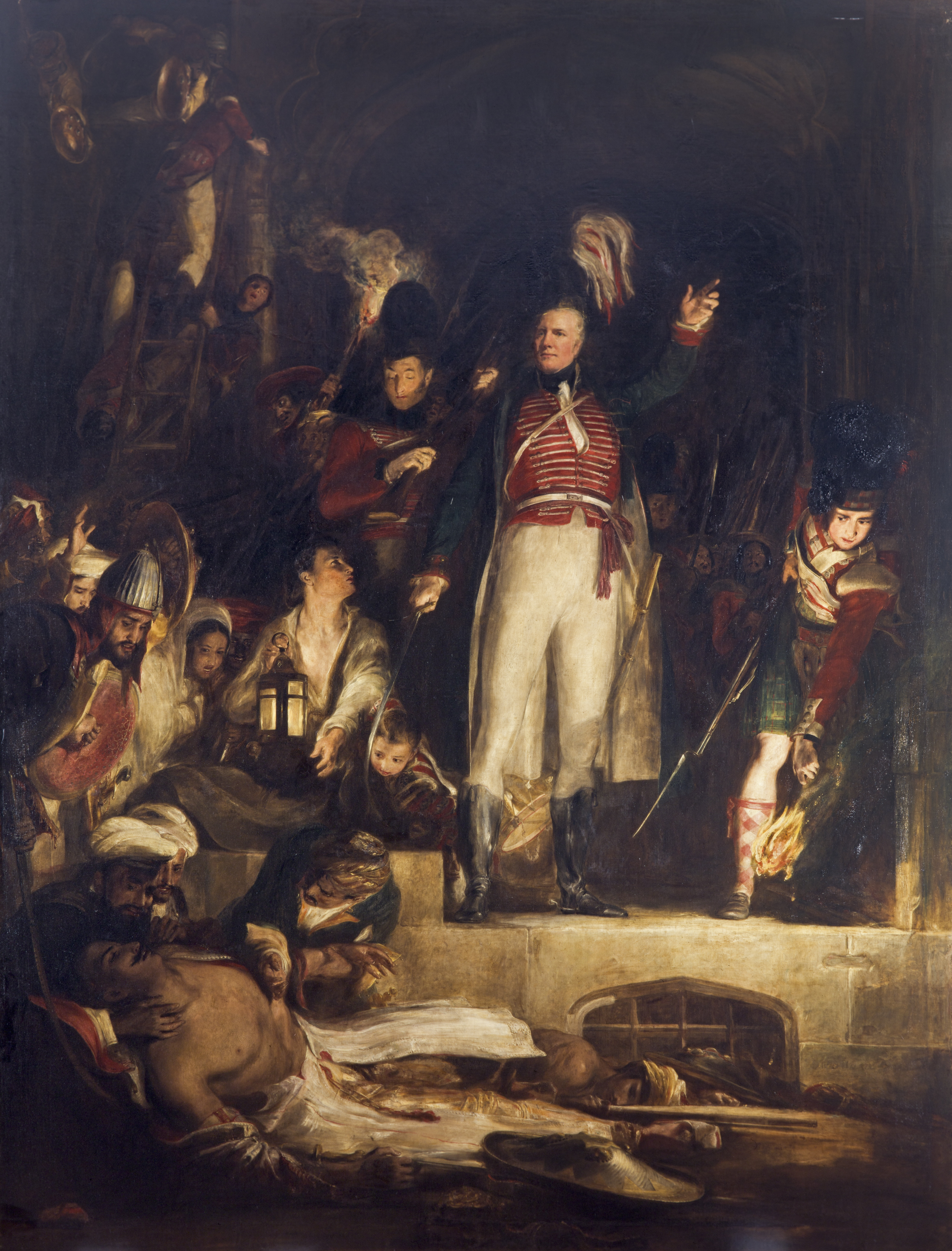
Sir David Baird Discovering the Body of Sultan Tipoo Sahib by David Wilkie, 1839.

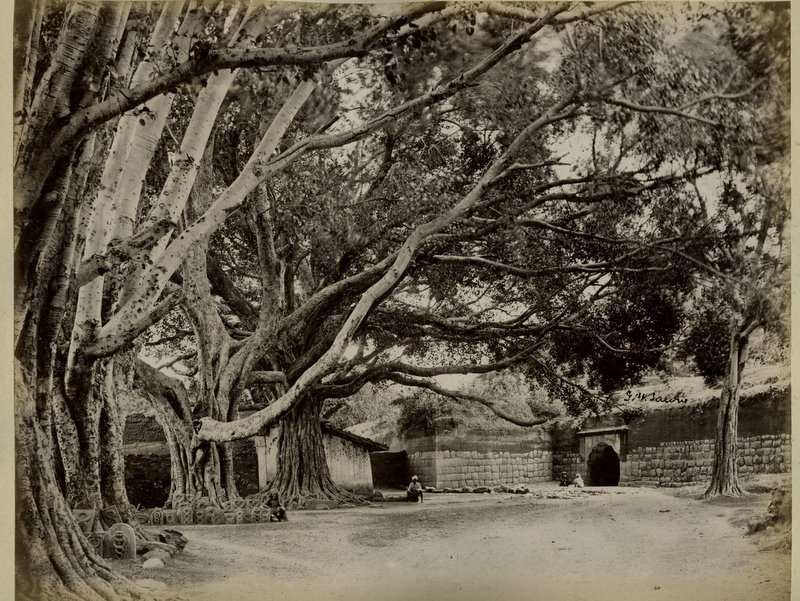
The spot where Sultan died (1880s)

The column that rounded the northwest corner of the outer wall was immediately involved in a serious fight with a group of Mysorean warriors under a fat officer, which defended every traverse. The officer was observed to be discharging hunting weapons loaded and passed to him by servants. After the fall of the city, in the gathering dusk, some of the British officers went to look for the body of Tipu Sultan. He was identified as the fat officer who had fired hunting weapons at the attackers, and his body was found in a choked tunnel-like passage near the Water Gate.

Benjamin Sydenham described the body as:

wounded a little above the right ear, and the ball lodged in the left cheek, he had also three wounds in the body, he was in stature about 5 ft 8 in (1.73 m) and not very fair, he was rather corpulent, had a short neck and high shoulders, but his wrists and ankles were small and delicate.

He had large full eyes, with small arched eyebrows and very small whiskers. His appearance denoted him to be above the Common Stamp. And his countenance expressed a mixture of haughtiness and resolution. He was dressed in a fine white linen jacket, chintz drawers, a crimson cloth round his waist with a red silk belt and pouch across his body and head.

He had lost his turban and there were no weapons of defence about him.

== Aftermath ==
The French contingent had all but surrendered once the battle was over, the rest were holed up in the palace, and even amidst the chaos that followed, they were spared from being killed, given their uniforms and ethnicity. As they were commissioned by the government of France they were to be either sent to England or back to France. Chapuis ended up spending two years in a Prison hulk off Portsmouth.

=== Legacy ===
All members of the British-led forces who took part in the siege were awarded a medal by the Governor-General of India.

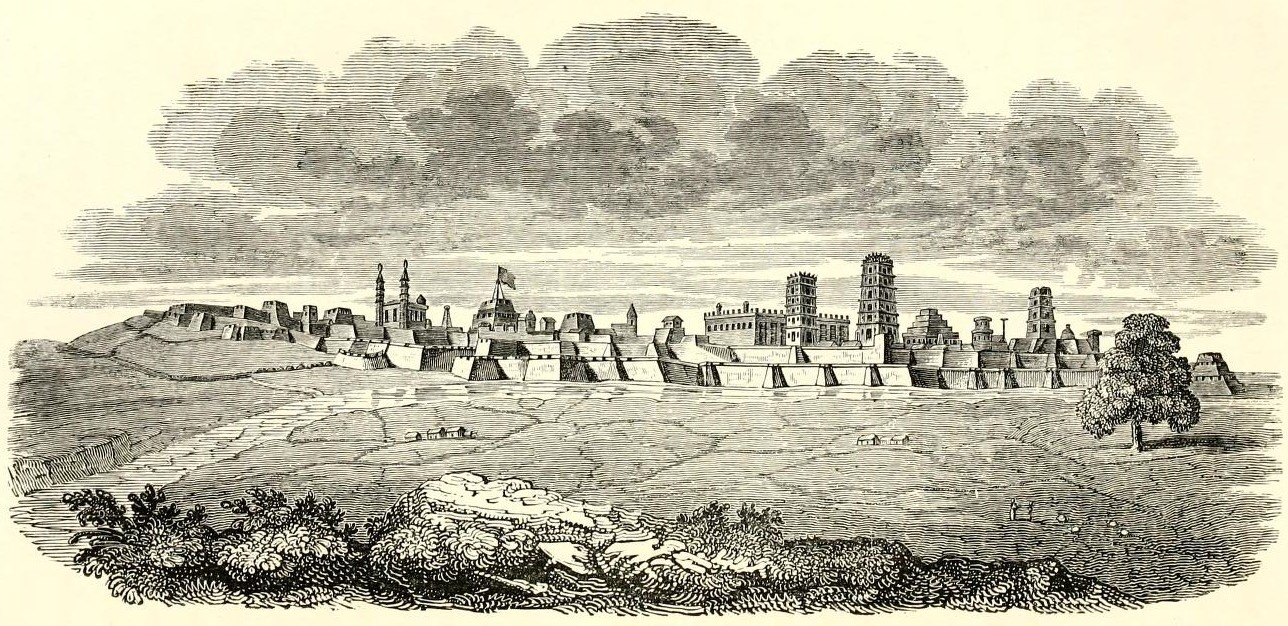
Seringapatam, by James Welsh, 1803.

Two cannon captured by the British during the battle are displayed at the Royal Military College, Sandhurst, now standing in front of the officers' mess. Tipu's Tiger, an automaton now in the Victoria and Albert Museum, was captured at Seringapatam.

Much of the site of the battle is still intact including the ramparts, the Water Gate where the Tipu Sultan's body was found, the area where the British prisoners were held, and the site of the destroyed palace.

Around 80 men of the Swiss ‘de Meuron Regiment’, who fell during the siege, and their family members are buried in the Garrison Cemetery, Seringapatam.

== Memorial ==
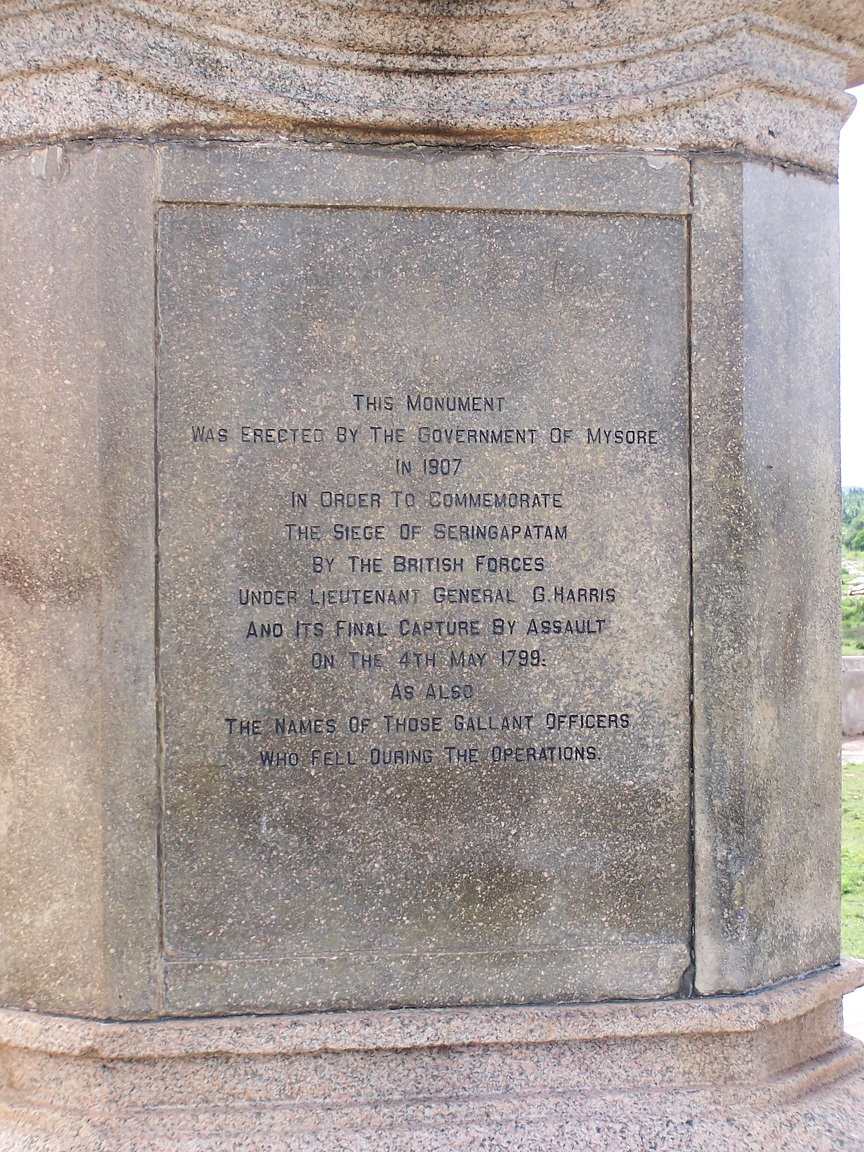
Memorial the siege of Seringapatam (1799) by the Mysore government, Seringapatam

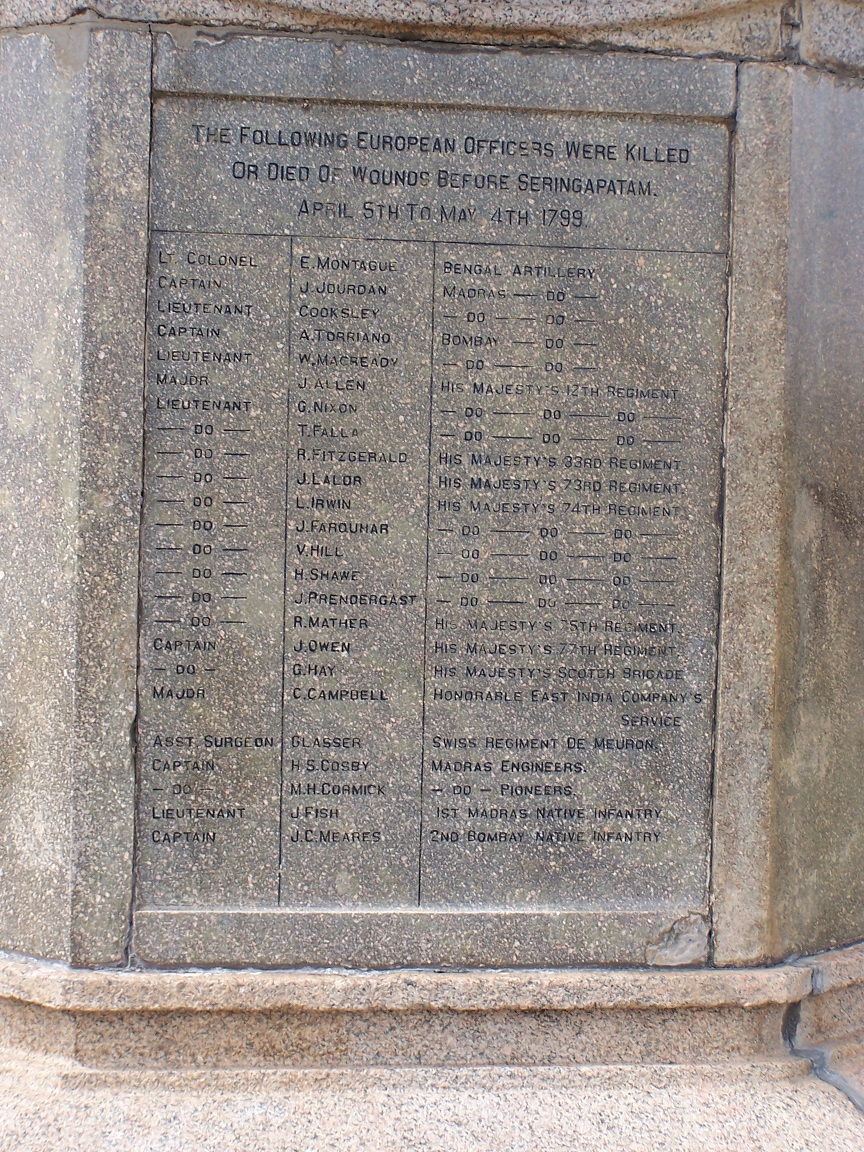
European officers killed in the siege of Seringapatam (1799), Seringapatam

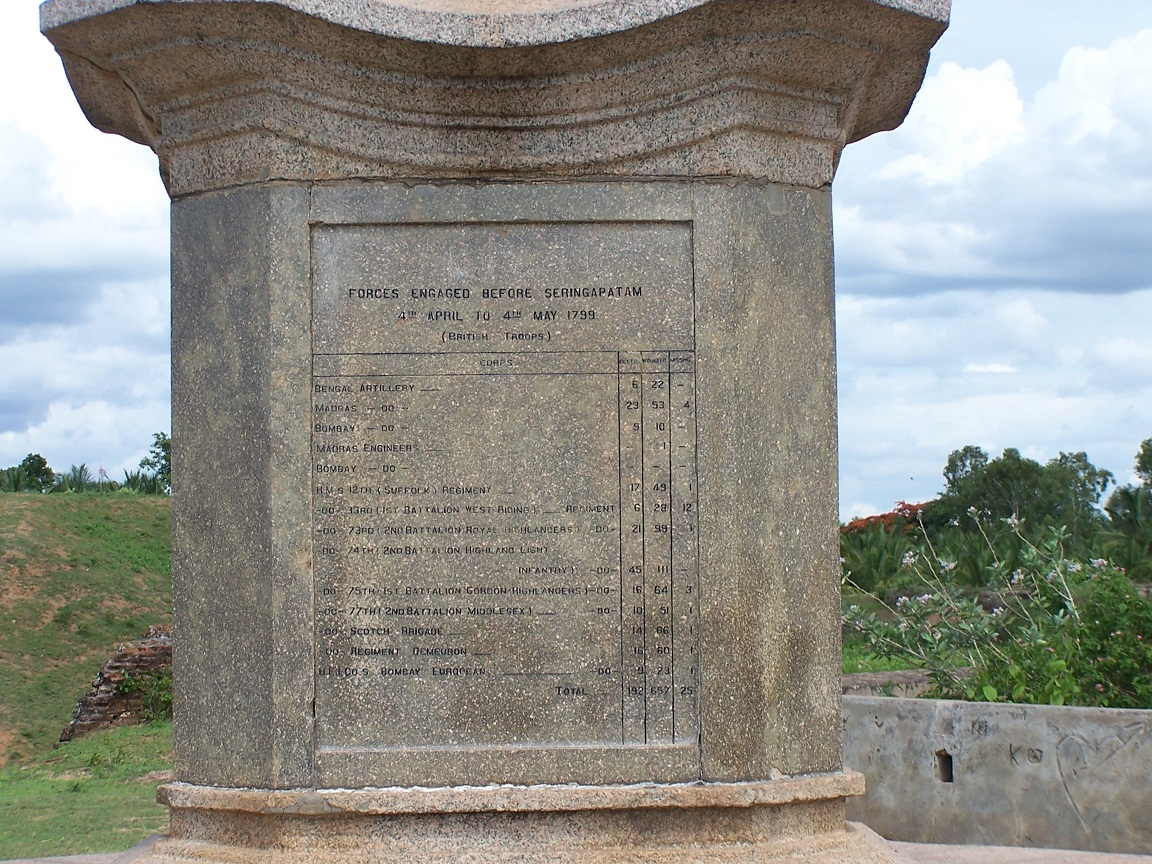
Forces engaged before Seringapatam (1799), Seringapatam

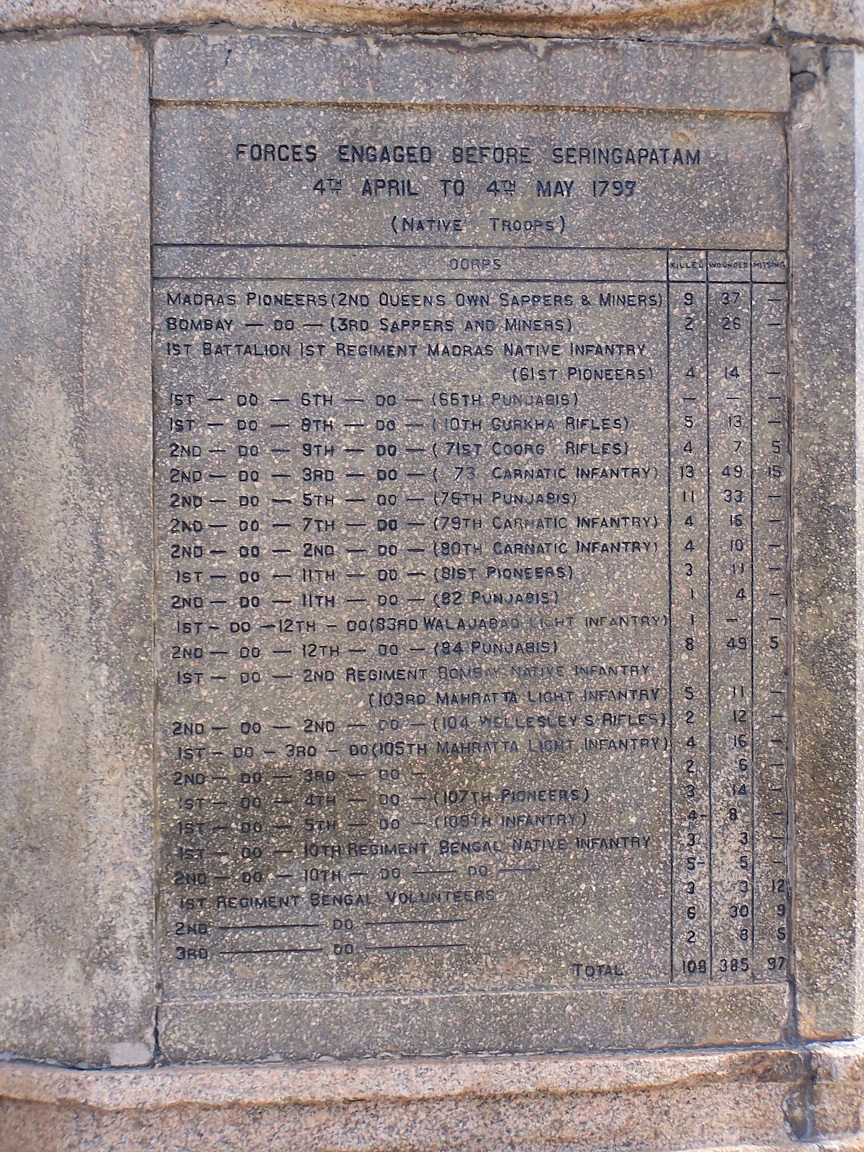
Forces engaged before Seringapatam (1799), Seringapatam

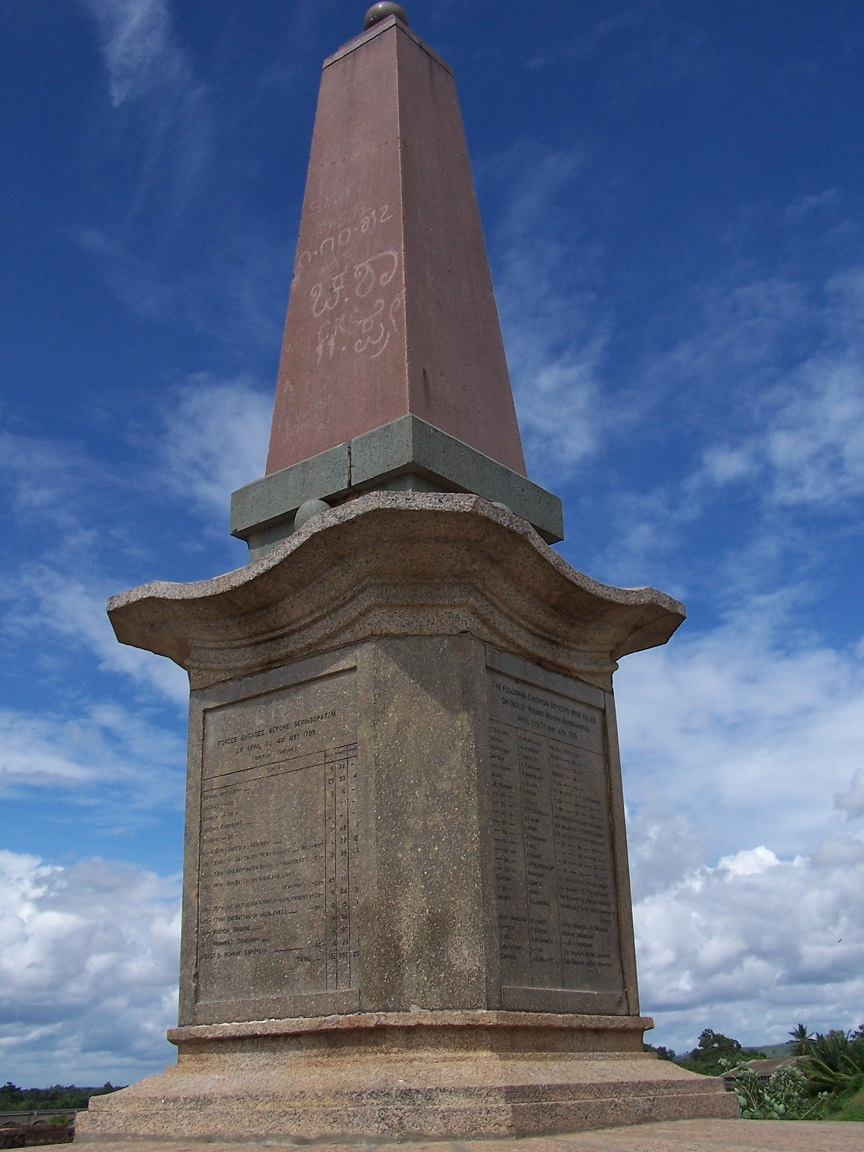
Memorial to the siege of Seringapatam (1799), Seringapatam

== See also ==
- Anglo-Mysore Wars
- Garrison Cemetery, Seringapatam
- Regiment de Meuron
- Seringapatam medal
