= Adgaon bk =

Village in Maharashtra, India

- village
- Location in Maharashtra, India Adgaon bk (India) Adgaon bk (Asia)
- Coordinates: 21.1268°N 76.9420°E
- Country: India
- State: Maharashtra
- District: Akola

Languages
  - Official: Marathi
- Time zone: UTC+5:30 (IST)
- PIN: 444126

Adgaon BK is a village in Telhara taluka in Akola district of Maharashtra State, India. It belongs to the Vidarbha region of Maharashtra, and to the Amravati division of Maharashtra. It is located 53 kilometres (33 mi) north of the district headquarters of Akola, 17 kilometres (11 mi) from Telhara, and 569 kilometres (354 mi) from the state capital Mumbai. The Battle of Argaon, in the Second Anglo-Maratha War, was named after the village.
