= Argaon =

Village in Maharashtra

- village
- Location in Maharashtra, India Argaon (India)
- Coordinates: 16.778999°N 73.64553°E
- Country: India
- State: Maharashtra
- District: Ratnagiri

Languages
  - Official: Marathi
- Time zone: UTC+5:30 (IST)
- PIN: 415643
- Telephone code: 02351
- Vehicle registration: MH 08
- Nearest city: Lanja
- Lok Sabha constituency: Lanja, Maharashtra
- Vidhan Sabha constituency: Lanja, Maharashtra

Argaon, or Argaum is a village in the Ratnagiri district of Maharashtra state in India. Ratnagiri is a coastal district on the Arabian Seafront. The landmass on the western part of Maharashtra along the Arabian Sea, sandwiched between the sea and a mountain range named Sahyadri, is known as Konkan. Argaon is situated in the foothills of the Sahyadri mountains.

With its evergreen vegetation and hilly landscape, it is pristine in the months of monsoon and after. Argaon has a small population because the majority of the people there have migrated to Mumbai, India's main economic center. However, due to attachment to their native place many return every summer and during the Ganapati & Shimga festivals.

== History ==
Argaon was the site of a battle during the Second Anglo-Maratha War in 1803, between British forces under the command of Arthur Wellesley, and the Marathi army. The battle was a decisive British victory, with 5,000 Marathi dead at a cost of only 361 British casualties. This result, and similar events at the Battle of Assaye and Gawilghur, lead to the Maratha Empire having to sign the Treaty of Surji-Anjangaon.

== Economy ==
Prominent businesses in the area include agriculture and horticulture. This region can grow good quality Alphanso Mangos and cashew nuts. Good quality teakwood is also planted en masse.

There are three primary schools in the village; for secondary school, children have to travel about six kilometers to a neighboring village. Education is in Marathi language. The language spoken here is Marathi, though some can understand Hindi and English. Electricity, telephones, and piped drinking water are the few developments in last 10–15 years. There are a few grocery shops to serve the needs of the locals.

From here the Vishalgad/Vishalgarh can be visited by trekking through the forest and Sahyadris which was under the reign of Surve Dynasty of Kumbharkani.

== Transport ==
Public transport to Argaon is from Lanja, a pachal town and from Lanja, another pachal in the vicinity. Six State Transport (ST) of Maharashtra buses ply this route during the day. Many auto rickshaws also travel this route. The city of Kolhapur is around 113 kilometers away and can be approached via Anuskura Ghat section. The city of Ratnagiri is about 87 kilometers from the village and a regular State Transport bus travels between the village and city.

The route from Mumbai is on National Highway 17 (NH17) through the town of Lanja, turning off at the village of Watul onto the state highway. The nearest railway station is Vilavade, on the Konkan Railway route, 5km away.

== Religion ==
As with a typical Indian village, there are goddesses, Dev Kedaling and Dev Gangeshwar, Vithal Rukhmai, Hanuman Mandir, Ganpati Mandir, Ram mandir, Vetal Mandir, as village deities Dev Kedaling is ritually consulted on every major aspect. Major festivals are Ganapati Utsav, Dahikala, Holi or Shimga, Navratra, Diwali, Navaratri Utsav, and Shivaratri; Ganapati Utsav is biggest of all of them. People visit their native village during Ganapati festival and is celebrated with gusto. Other major festival is Holi and is known better as Shimga locally.
