= Highland Light Infantry =

Light infantry regiment of the British Army

Highland Light Infantry (City of Glasgow Regiment)
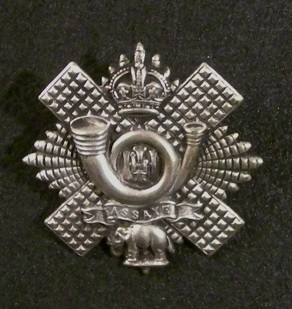
- Cap badge
- Active: 1881–1959
- Country: United Kingdom
- Branch: British Army
- Type: Infantry
- Role: Light infantry
- Part of: Highland Brigade
- Garrison/HQ: Hamilton Barracks (1881–1921); Maryhill Barracks, Glasgow (1921–1959)
- Nickname: "Hell's Last Issue" The regiment was nicknamed 'The Glesga Keelies' during the Peninsular Wars.
- March: Quick- Sean Triubhas (Whistle o'er the Lave o't); Slow - Garb of Old Gaul
- Mascot: Elephant
- Anniversaries: Assaye (September 23)

Insignia
- Hackle: White
- Tartan: MacKenzie Tartan

The Highland Light Infantry (HLI) was a light infantry regiment of the British Army formed in 1881. It took part in the First and Second World Wars. It was amalgamated with the Royal Scots Fusiliers in 1959 to form the Royal Highland Fusiliers (Princess Margaret's Own Glasgow and Ayrshire Regiment), which later merged with the Royal Scots Borderers, the Black Watch (Royal Highland Regiment), the Highlanders (Seaforth, Gordons and Camerons) and the Argyll and Sutherland Highlanders to form the Royal Regiment of Scotland, becoming the 2nd Battalion of the new regiment.

== History ==
=== Early history ===
The regiment was formed as part of the Childers Reforms on 1 July 1881 by the amalgamation of the 71st (Highland) Light Infantry (as the 1st Battalion) and the 74th (Highland) Regiment of Foot (as the 2nd Battalion) as the city regiment of Glasgow, absorbing local Militia and Rifle Volunteer units. Its exact status was ambiguous: although the regiment insisted on being classified as a non-kilted Highland regiment, it recruited mainly from Glasgow in Lowland Scotland.

The 1st battalion was posted to South Africa in October 1899, after the outbreak of the Second Boer War. The battalion served throughout the war, which ended in June 1902. The battalion of 700 men left Durban for Egypt on the SS Plassy in January 1903, and was subsequently stationed there in the following years.

The 2nd Battalion saw action at the Battle of Tell El Kebir in September 1882 during the Anglo-Egyptian War: Lieutenant William Edwards was awarded the Victoria Cross for his actions during the battle. The battalion was stationed in England from 1883, but moved to India the following year. In February 1900 the battalion departed from Colombo to return home, and in October 1902 they were posted to Jersey, but three months later they were reassigned to Alderney.

Following heavy British losses in the early part of the Second Boer War in 1899, many of the militia battalions were embodied for active service, including the 3rd battalion Highland Light (formerly the 1st Royal Lanark Militia), under the command of Lieutenant-Colonel William Story. The battalion served throughout the war, and 890 officers and men were reported to return home on the SS Doune Castle in September 1902, after the war had ended earlier that year.

In 1908, the Volunteers and Militia were reorganised nationally, with the former becoming the Territorial Force and the latter the Special Reserve; the regiment now had two Reserve and five Territorial battalions.

=== First World War ===
==== Regular Army ====
The 1st Battalion landed at Marseille as part of the Sirhind Brigade in the 3rd (Lahore) Division in December 1914 for service on the Western Front and entered the trenches near Festubert. It fought in the Battle of Neuve Chapelle in March 1915, the Battle of St Julien in May 1915 and the Second Battle of Ypres later in May 1915. It then moved to Mesopotamia in December 1915 and saw action at the Siege of Kut in Spring 1916 and the Battle of Sharqat in October 1918.

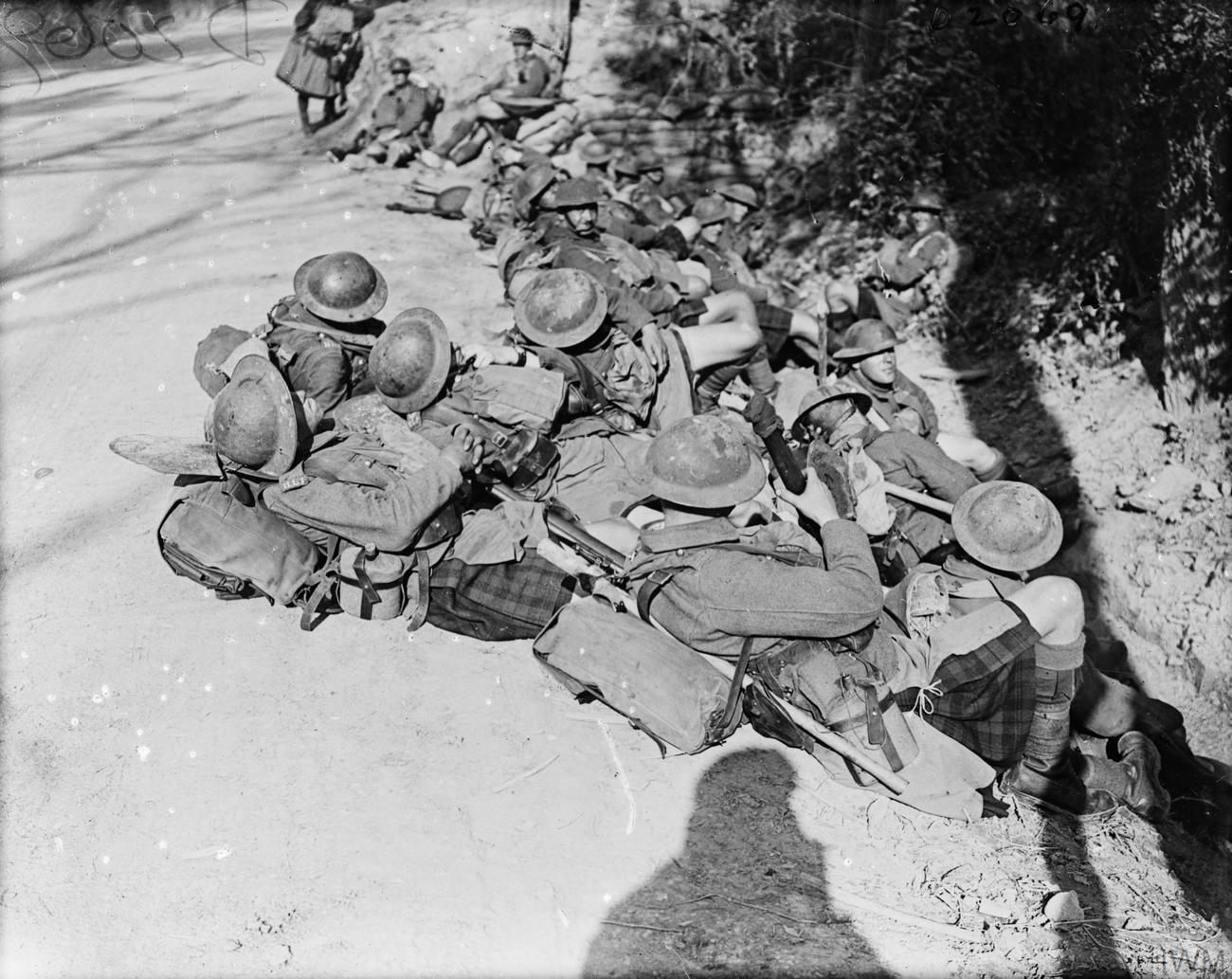
Troops of the Highland Light Infantry resting by the roadside on the way up to attack, 24 September 1917.

The 2nd Battalion landed at Boulogne-sur-Mer as part of the 5th Brigade in the 2nd Division in August 1914 for service on the Western Front. It saw action at the Battle of Aisne in September 1914, the Battle of Ypres in November 1914, the Battle of Loos in October 1915, the Battle of the Somme in Summer 1916, the Battle of Arras in April 1917, the Battle of Cambrai in December 1917 and the advance to the Hindenburg Line in September 1918.

==== Territorial Force ====
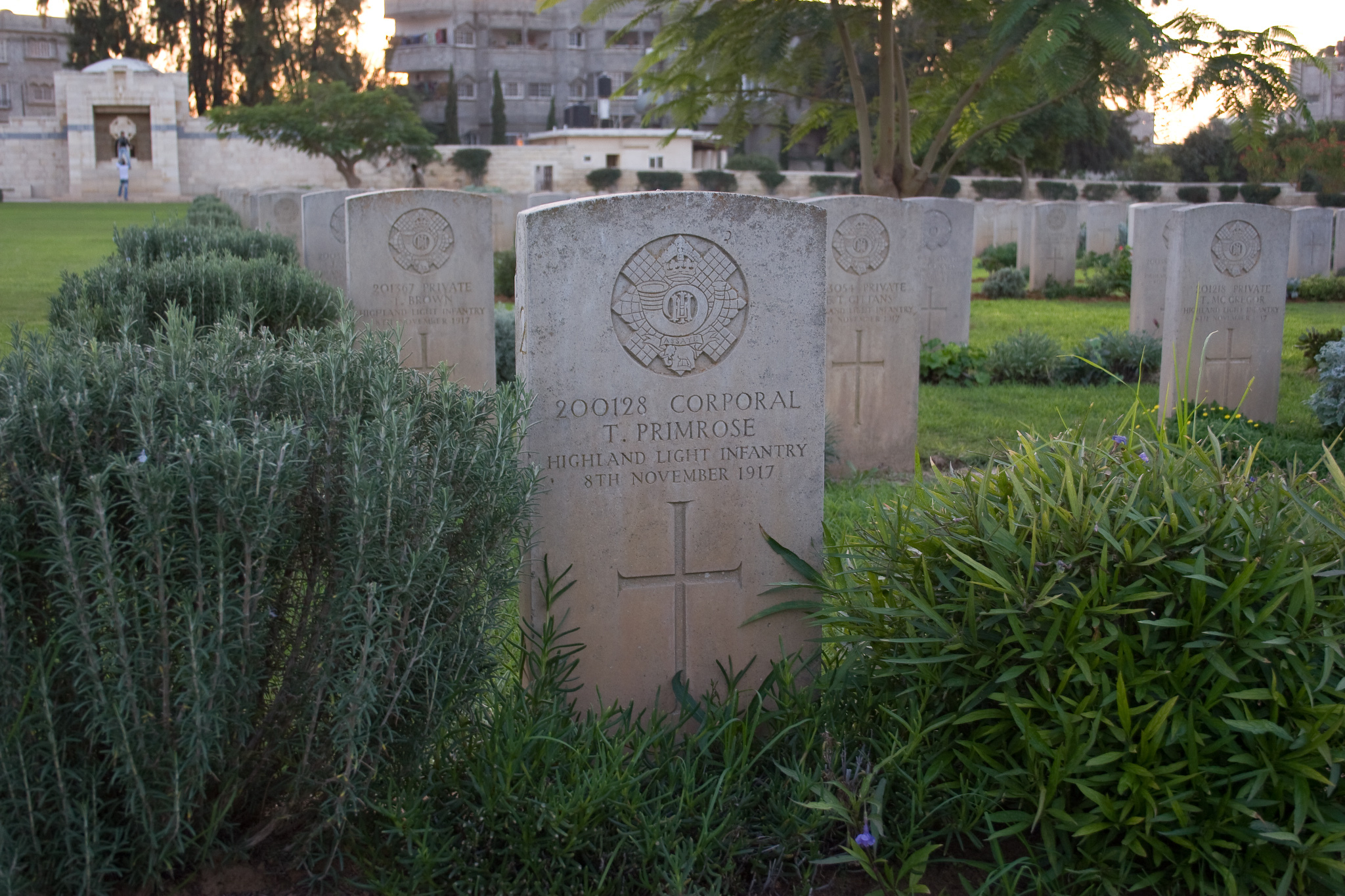
Gravestones of HLI soldiers who died in the First World War in the Commonwealth War Graves Commission Cemetery in Gaza City

The 1/5th (City of Glasgow) Battalion, the 1/6th (City of Glasgow) Battalion and the 1/7th (Blythswood) Battalion landed at Cape Helles in Gallipoli as part of the 157th Brigade in the 52nd (Lowland) Division in July 1915; after being evacuated to Egypt in January 1916 they moved to Marseille in April 1918 for service on the Western Front. The 1/9th (Glasgow Highland) Battalion landed in France as part of the 5th Brigade in the 2nd Division in November 1914 for service on the Western Front.

==== New Armies ====
The 10th and 11th (Service) Battalions landed at Boulogne-sur-Mer as part of the 28th Brigade in the 9th (Scottish) Division in May 1915 for service on the Western Front. The 12th (Service) Battalion landed at Boulogne-sur-Mer as part of the 46th Brigade in the 15th (Scottish) Division in July 1915 for service on the Western Front. The 14th (Service) Battalion landed in France as part of the 120th Brigade in the 40th Division in June 1916 for service on the Western Front.

The 15th (Service) Battalion (1st Glasgow), the 16th (Service) Battalion (2nd Glasgow) and the 17th (Service) Battalion (3rd Glasgow) landed at Boulogne-sur-Mer as part of the 97th Brigade in the 32nd Division in November 1915 for service on the Western Front. The 16th (Service) Battalion (2nd Glasgow), which was formed from former members of the Glasgow Battalion of the Boys' Brigade and was known as the Glasgow Boys' Brigade Battalion is particularly remembered for an incident at the Frankfurt trench at the Battle of the Ancre, the last offensive of the battle of the Somme, where around 60 men of D company were surrounded and cut off behind enemy lines. Relief attempts failed, but the men of the Frankfurt trench refused to surrender. After refusing to surrender, the Germans stormed the trench and found only 15 wounded men alive, three of whom died soon afterwards. General Sir Hubert Gough praised their stand under Army Order 193. Members of the 17th (Service) Battalion were painted by the war artist Frederick Farrell in Flanders in 1917.

The 18th (Service) Battalion (4th Glasgow) landed in France as part of the 106th Brigade in the 35th Division in February 1916 for service on the Western Front.

=== Between the Wars ===
In 1923, the regiment's title was expanded to the Highland Light Infantry (City of Glasgow Regiment). David Niven was commissioned into the regiment in 1930 and served with the 2nd Battalion.

=== Second World War ===
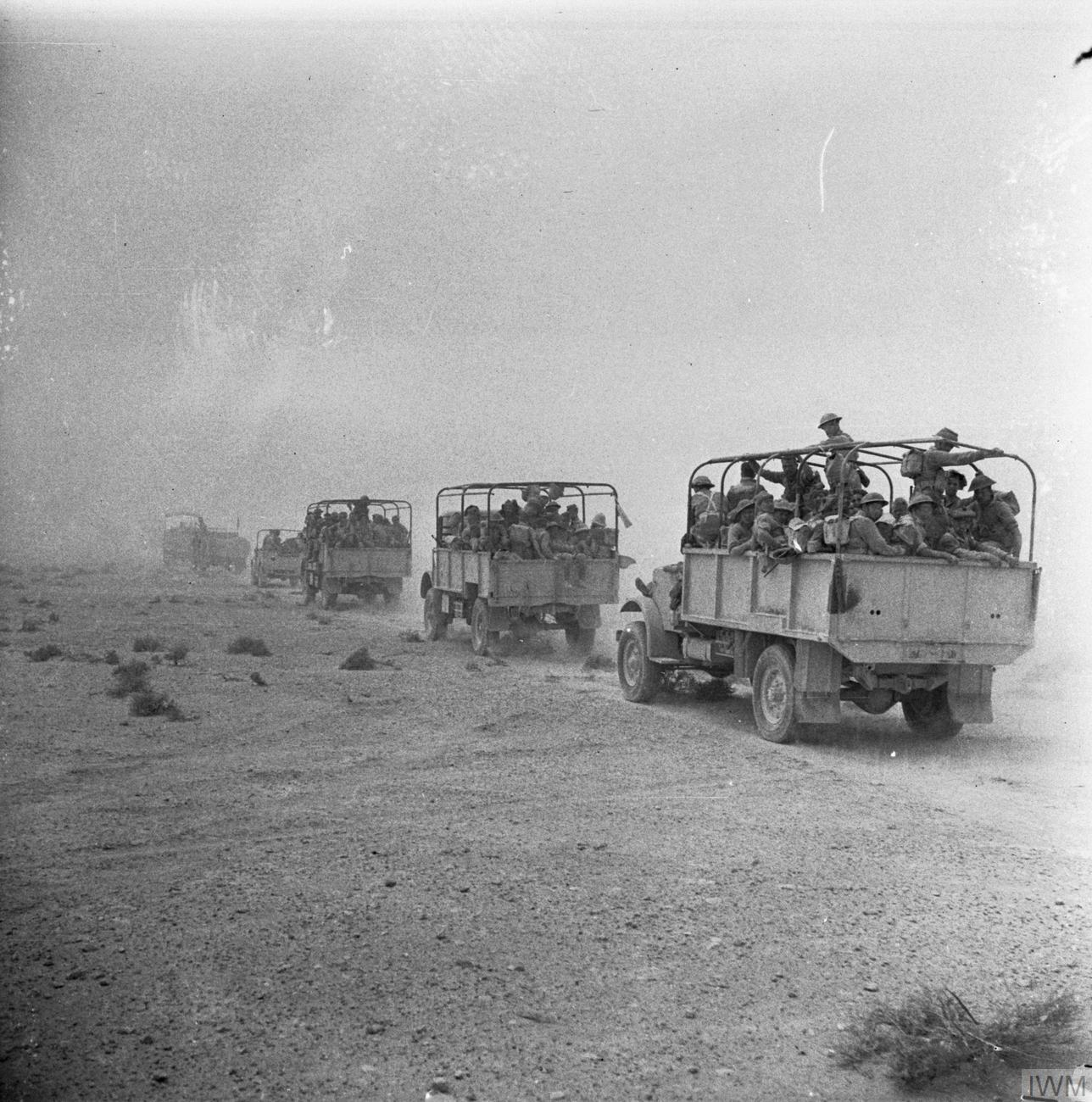
Lorries carrying men of the 2nd Battalion, Highland Light Infantry towards the front line, 9 June 1942.

The 1st Battalion landed in France in September 1939 as part of the 127th (Manchester) Brigade in the 42nd (East Lancashire) Division for service with the British Expeditionary Force and then took part in the Dunkirk evacuation in June 1940. As part of the 71st Infantry Brigade in the 53rd (Welsh) Division, it later took part in the Normandy landings in June 1944 and saw action at the Battle of the Bulge in January 1945, the Battle of the Reichswald in March 1945 and the final advance into Germany.

The 2nd Battalion moved to Egypt early in the war and saw action at the Battle of Keren in March 1941. It then transferred to the Western Desert and, as part of the 10th Indian Infantry Brigade of the 5th Indian Infantry Division, saw combat at the Battle of Knightsbridge in June 1942 and the Battle of Fuka in July 1942. It took part in the Allied invasion of Sicily in July 1943 and, after a period in Yugoslavia, Albania and Greece, took part in the final advance into Northern Italy.

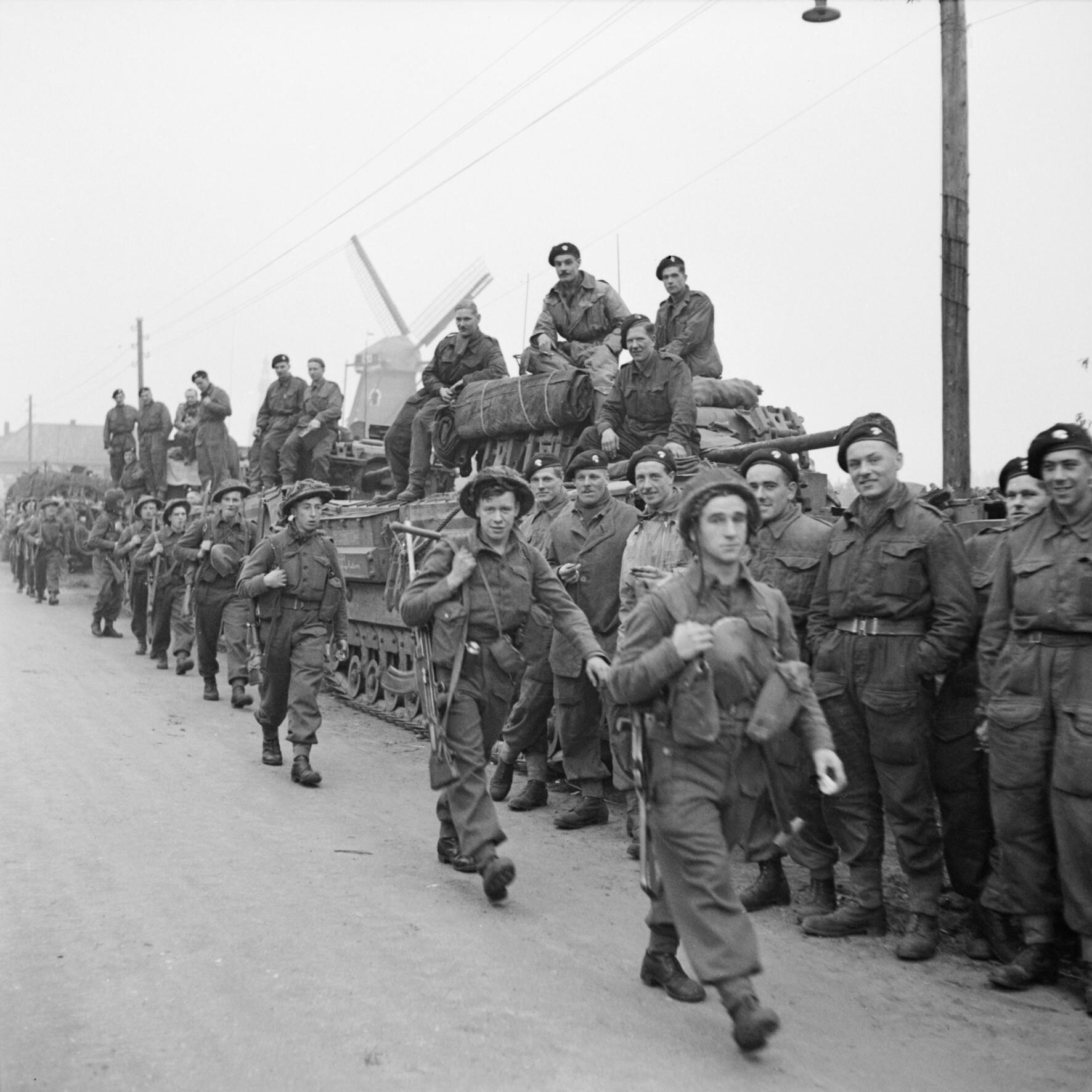
Churchill tanks of 6th Guards Tank Brigade and troops of the 10th Battalion, Highland Light Infantry during the assault on Tilburg, Holland, 28 October 1944.

The 5th and 6th Battalions landed in France as part of the 157th Brigade in the 52nd (Lowland) Division in June 1940; after evacuation from Cherbourg later in the month, they landed in Belgium in October 1944 and took part in Operation Infatuate in November 1944 and the subsequent capture of Bremen in April 1945.

The 11th Battalion was converted to armour in 1942, becoming the 156th Regiment in the Royal Armoured Corps, but with the men retaining their Highland Light Infantry cap badges on the black beret of the RAC.

=== After the War ===
The Highland Light Infantry was amalgamated with the Royal Scots Fusiliers in 1959 to form the Royal Highland Fusiliers. The regular 1st battalions of the two Regiments combined at Redford Barracks, Edinburgh to form the 1st Battalion of the new regiment (1 RHF).

== Uniform ==
The HLI's full dress in 1914 was an unusual one; comprising a dark green shako with diced border and green cords, scarlet doublet with buff facings and trews of the Mackenzie tartan. Officers wore plaids of the same tartan, while in drill order all ranks wore white shell jackets with trews and green glengarry caps.

The HLI was the only regular Highland regiment to wear trews for full dress; in 1947, kilts were authorised. An earlier exception was the Glasgow Highlanders, who wore kilts and were a territorial battalion within the HLI. The regiment had worn the tartan trews with khaki-drab tropical service uniform until 1900.

== Battle honours and colours ==
The battle honours were as follows:
Borne on the regimental colours, representing actions fought by the 71st and 74th Regiments of Foot or the Highland Light Infantry prior to 1914:

- "Carnatic", "Hindustan", "Sholingur", "Mysore", "Gibraltar 1780-83", "Seringapatam", "Assaye", "Cape of Good Hope 1806", "Rolica", "Vimiera", "Corunna", "Busaco", "Fuentes d'Onor", "Ciudad Rodrigo", "Badajos"' "Almaraz", "Salamanca", "Vittoria", "Pyrenees", "Nivelle, "Nive", "Orthes", "Toulouse", "Peninsula",
- "Waterloo", "South Africa 1851-2-3", "Egypt 1882", "Tel-el-Kebir", "Modder River", "South Africa 1899-1902"

Ten representative battle honours for each of the First and Second World Wars borne on the queen's colours:

- First World War: "Mons", "Ypres 1914,'15,'17,'18", "Loos", "Somme 1916,'18", "Arras 1917,'18", "Hindenburg Line", "Gallipoli 1915–16", "Palestine 1917–18", "Mesopotamia 1916–18", "Archangel 1919".
- Second World War: "Odon", "Scheldt", "Walcheren Causeway", "Rhine", "Reichswald", "North-West Europe 1940, '44-45", "Keren Cauldron", "Landing in Sicily", "Greece 1944–45"

== Colonels-in-Chief ==
Colonels-in-chief of the Regiment were:

- 1901–1942: The Duke of Connaught and Strathearn, KG, KT, KP, GCB, GCSI, GCMG, GCIE, GCVO, VD, TD
- 1947–1959: Princess Margaret, Countess of Snowdon, CI, GCVO

== Regimental colonels ==
Colonels of the Regiment were:

- 1881–1888 (1st Battalion): Gen. John Hamilton Elphinstone Dalrymple, CB (ex 71st Foot)
- 1881–1901 (2nd Battalion): Gen. Walter Douglas Phillips Patton-Bethune (ex 74th (Highland) Regiment of Foot)
- 1901–1903: Lt-Gen. William Kelty McLeod
- 1903–1916: Gen. Sir Henry John Thoroton Hildyard, GCB
- 1916–1918: Lt-Gen. Sir William Pitcairn Campbell, KCB
- 1918–1921: Lt-Gen. Sir David Henderson, KCB, KCVO, DSO
- 1921–1929: Maj-Gen. Granville Egerton, CB
- 1929: Gen. Sir Henry Horne, 1st Baron Horne, GCB, KCMG
- 1929–1936: Brig-Gen. Sir Alfred Granville Balfour, KBE, CB
- 1936–1946: Maj-Gen. Sir Andrew Jameson McCulloch, KBE, CB, DSO, DCM
- 1946–1954: Maj-Gen. Alexander Patrick Drummond Telfer-Smollett, CB, CBE, DSO, MC
- 1954–1957: Maj-Gen. Robert Elliott Urquhart, CB, DSO
- 1957–1959: Maj-Gen. Ronald Albert Bramwell Davis, CB, DSO (to Royal Highland Fusiliers)
- 1959: Regiment amalgamated with the Royal Scots Fusiliers to form the Royal Highland Fusiliers

== See also ==
- 1st Highland Light Infantry F.C.
- 2nd Highland Light Infantry F.C.

== Sources ==
- Carman, W.Y. (1985). Richard Simkin's Uniforms of the British Army: the Infantry Regiments. Webb & Bower. ISBN 0-86350-031-5.
- Forty, George (1998). British Army Handbook 1939–1945. Stroud: Sutton Publishing. ISBN 978-0750931908.
