= Battle of Assaye =

1803 battle of the Second Anglo-Maratha War

- Part of the Second Anglo-Maratha War
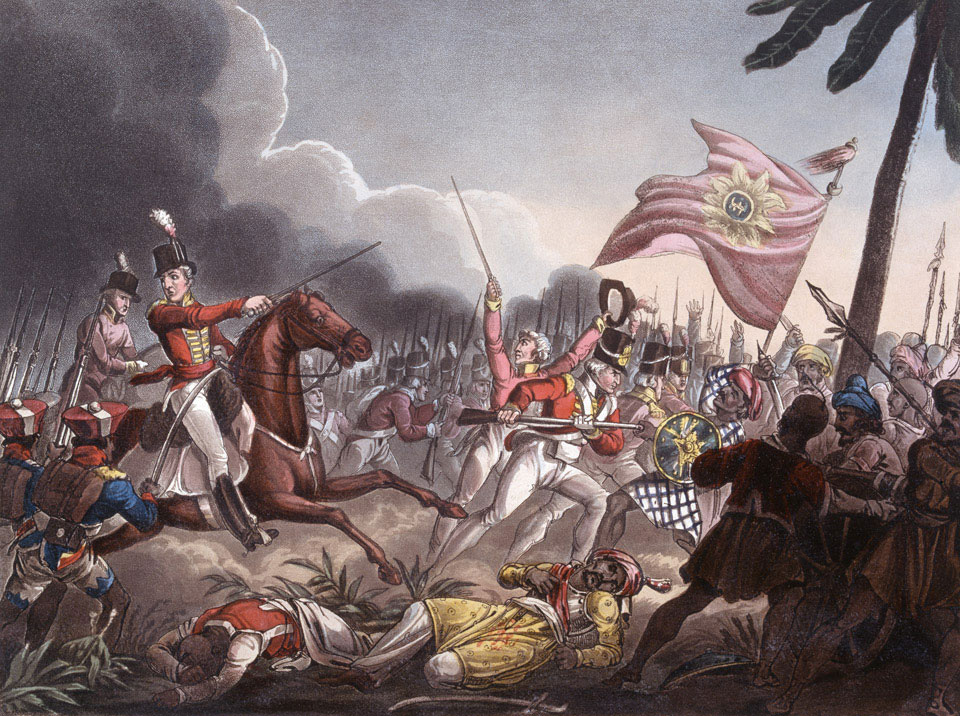
- c. 1815 engraving of the battle
| Date | 23 September 1803 |
| Location | Near Assaye, Jalna 20.235°N 75.890°E |
| Result | British victory |

Belligerents
| (United Kingdom of Great Britain and Ireland) British Empire; East India Company; Maratha Empire; Peshwa | Maratha Empire; Kingdom of Nagpur; Gwalior State |

Commanders and leaders
| (United Kingdom of Great Britain and Ireland) Arthur Wellesley (East India Company) James Stevenson | Raghuji II; Anthony Pohlmann; Daulatrao Scindia |

Strength
| Total: 9,500; 5,500 cavalry (400-600 committed); 4,000 Infantry; 17 cannons | Total: 50,800-70,800; 10,800 European trained Indian infantry 10,000–20,000 irregular infantry 30,000–40,000 irregular cavalry 100+ guns |

Casualties and losses
| 428 killed 1,138 wounded 18 missing | 1,200–3,000 killed 3,000–4,500 wounded 98 cannons lost |
- Location within India

The Battle of Assaye was fought on 23 September 1803 during the Second Anglo-Maratha War between the British and Maratha empires. An outnumbered British army led by Major General Arthur Wellesley defeated a Maratha army under the command of Daulatrao Scindia and Raghoji II Bhonsle near Assaye in western India. The battle was Wellesley's first major victory and one he would later describe as his finest accomplishment on the battlefield, even more so than his more famous victories in the Peninsular War and his defeat of Napoleon at the Battle of Waterloo.

In August 1803, Wellesley's army and a separate British force under the command of his subordinate Colonel James Stevenson began pursuing the Maratha army, which had threatened to raid south into Hyderabad. After several weeks of pursuit and counter-marching, Scindia reinforced the Maratha army with his Westernised infantry and artillery as the two British forces closed in on his position. Wellesley received intelligence indicating the location of the Maratha encampment on 21 September and devised a plan whereby his two armies would converge on the Maratha position three days later.

On 23 September, Wellesley's force encountered the Maratha army 6 miles (9.7 km) farther south than he anticipated. Although outnumbered, Wellesley resolved to attack at once, believing that the Maratha army would soon move off. Both sides suffered severely in the ensuing battle; Maratha artillery inflicted large numbers of casualties among Wellesley's troops but the vast numbers of Maratha cavalry proved largely ineffective. A combination of bayonet and cavalry charges eventually forced the Maratha army to retreat with the loss of most of their guns, though Wellesley's army was too battered and exhausted to pursue.

Wellesley's victory at Assaye, preceded by the capture of Ahmednagar and followed by victories at Argaon and Gawilghur, resulted in the defeat of Scindia and Berar's armies in the Deccan. Wellesley's progress in the Deccan was matched by Lieutenant-General Gerard Lake's successful campaigns in northern India and led to the British becoming the dominant power in the heartland of India.

== Background ==
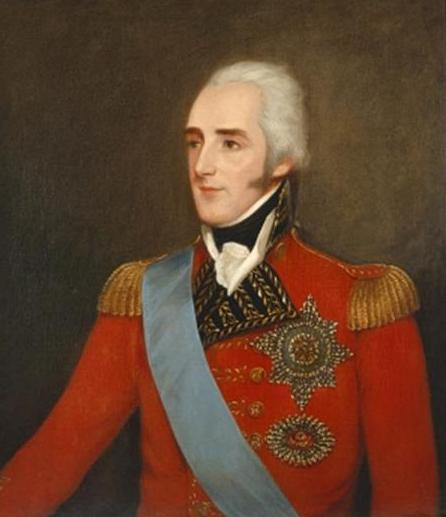
Lord Mornington, the Governor-General of British India between 1798 and 1805, oversaw a rapid expansion of British territory in India.

Feuding between the two dominant powers within the Maratha Empire, Yashwantrao Holkar and Daulat Rao Sindhia, led to civil war at the turn of the 19th century. The hostilities culminated in the Battle of Poona in October 1802 where Holkar defeated a combined army of Scindia and Baji Rao II – the Peshwa and nominal overlord of the Maratha Empire. Scindia retreated into his dominions to the north, but Baji Rao was driven from his territory and sought refuge with the East India Company at Bassein. He appealed to the company for assistance, offering to accept its authority if he were restored to his principality at Poona. Lord Mornington, the ambitious Governor-General of British India, seized on the opportunity to extend Company influence into the Maratha Empire which he perceived as the final obstacle to Britain being the dominant force in the Indian subcontinent. The Treaty of Bassein was signed in December whereby the Company agreed to restore Baji Rao in return for control over his foreign affairs and a garrison of 6,000 Company troops permanently stationed in Poona. The restoration was commanded by Lord Mornington's younger brother, Major-general Arthur Wellesley, who in March 1803 marched on Poona from Mysore with 15,000 Company troops and 9,000 Hyderabad allies. Wellesley entered Poona without opposition on 20 April, and Baji Rao was formally restored to his throne on 13 May.

The treaty gave offence to the other Maratha leaders, who deemed that the system of subsidiary alliances with the British was an unwarranted interference into their affairs and fatal to the independent Maratha states. The Maratha leaders refused to submit to the Peshwa's authority and tensions were raised further when Holkar raided into Hyderabad in May, claiming that the Nizam of Hyderabad (a British ally) owed him money. Mornington consequently engaged the various Maratha chieftains in negotiations. Lieutenant-colonel John Collins was sent to Scindia's camp to discuss his objections and propose a defensive alliance. However, Scindia had formed a military alliance with Raghoji II with a view to bringing the Maratha leaders into a coalition against the British, and had begun to mass his forces on the Nizam's border. Wellesley, who had been given control over the company's military and political affairs in Central India in June, demanded Scindia declare his intentions and withdraw his forces or face the prospect of war. After a protracted period of negotiations, Collins reported to Wellesley on 3 August that Scindia refused to give an answer and would not withdraw his troops. Wellesley's response was to declare war on Scindia and Berar "in order to secure the interests of the British government and its allies".

The British launched offensives against the two principal Maratha forces of Scindia and the Raja of Berar from the north and the south. Of the other Maratha leaders, Holkar was hesitant to enter the war in cooperation with his rival, Scindia, and remained aloof from the hostilities, and the Gaekwad of Baroda placed himself under British protection. Operations in the north were directed by Lieutenant General Gerard Lake who entered Maratha territory from Cawnpore to face Scindia's main army which was commanded by the French mercenary Pierre Cuillier-Perron. A second British force, under the command of Arthur Wellesley, confronted a combined army of Scindia and Berar in the Deccan. Wellesley was determined to gain the initiative through offensive action and told his senior subordinate, Colonel James Stevenson, that "a long defensive war would ruin us and will answer no purpose whatever".

The Maratha army in the Deccan was largely composed of fast-moving cavalry able to live off the land. Consequently, Wellesley planned to work in conjunction with a separate force under Stevenson to enable his slower troops to outmanoeuvre the Maratha army and force it into a position where it could not avoid a pitched battle. Stevenson was despatched from Hyderabad with an army of roughly 10,000 men to Jafarabad to deny Scindia and Berar the chance to raid east into the Nizam's territory. In the meantime, Wellesley moved north from his camp near the Godavari River on 8 August with some 13,500 troops and headed towards Scindia's nearest stronghold – the walled town and fort at Ahmednagar. The bulk of his forces were Company troops from Mysore: five sepoy infantry battalions of the Madras Native Infantry and three squadrons of Madras Native Cavalry. The core contingent of British Army regulars included cavalry from the 19th Light Dragoons and two battalions of Scottish infantry from the 74th and 78th Regiment of Foot. Irregular light cavalry were also provided by the company's Mysore and Maratha allies.

Wellesley reached Ahmednagar later the same day after a 7-mile (11 km) march and immediately ordered an escalade assault on the town rather than enter into a time-consuming siege. The walled town, which was garrisoned by 1,000 Arab mercenaries, upwards of 60 cannon and one of Scindia's infantry battalions under the command of French officers, was captured with minimal losses after a brief action. The adjacent fort's defenders capitulated four days later once the walls were breached by British artillery. With the fortification providing a base for future operations into Maratha territory, Wellesley installed a garrison and headed north towards the Nizam's city of Aurangabad. Along the way he captured Scindia's other possessions south of the Godavari and established a series of guarded bridges and ferries along the river to maintain his communication and supply lines.

=== Maratha reinforcements ===
Map of the Assaye campaign

The Marathas slipped past Stevenson and advanced on Hyderabad. After receiving reports of their movement on 30 August, Wellesley hurried east down to the Godavari to intercept. Stevenson, meanwhile, marched westwards to the Maratha city of Jalna, which he took by storm. Scindia learned of Wellesley's intentions and returned to a position north of Jalna. Unable to make a clean break from the pursuing British, he abandoned plans to raid into Hyderabad and instead assembled his infantry and artillery. The combined Maratha army was around 50,000 strong, the core of which was 10,800 well-equipped regular infantry organised into three brigades, trained and commanded by European adventurer and mercenary officers. Colonel Anthony Pohlmann, a Hanoverian and former East India Company sergeant, commanded the largest brigade with eight battalions. A further brigade with five battalions was provided by Begum Samru, and was commanded on her behalf by a Frenchman, Colonel Jean Saleur. The third brigade had four battalions and was commanded by Dutchman Major John James Dupont. In addition, the Maratha force included 10,000–20,000 of Berar's irregular infantry, some 30,000–40,000 irregular light cavalry and over 100 guns ranging in size from one to 18-pounders.

After several weeks of chasing down the Maratha army, Wellesley and Stevenson met at Budnapoor on 21 September and received intelligence that the Maratha army was at Borkardan, around 30 miles (48 km) to the north. They agreed on a plan by which their two armies – moving separately along either side of a range of hills with Wellesley to the east and Stevenson to the west – would converge on Borkardan on 24 September. Wellesley's force reached Paugy on the afternoon of 22 September and departed camp before dawn. By noon, the army had marched 14 miles (23 km) to Naulniah, a small town 12 miles (19 km) south of Borkardan, where they intended to rest before joining Stevenson to attack the Maratha army the next day. At this point, Wellesley received further intelligence that, rather than being at Borkardan, the Maratha army was camped just 5 miles (8.0 km) north, but their cavalry had moved off and the infantry were about to follow.

At about 13:00, Wellesley went forward with a cavalry escort to reconnoitre the Maratha position. The rest of his army followed closely behind, apart from a battalion of sepoys left at Naulniah to guard the baggage. In all, Wellesley had 4,500 troops at his disposal, plus 5,000 Mysore and Maratha horse and 17 cannon. Aware that the British were nearby, the Maratha chiefs had positioned their army in a strong defensive position along a tongue of land stretching east from Borkardan between the Kailna River and its tributary the Juah. However, Scindia and Berar did not believe Wellesley would attack with his small force and had moved away from the area in the morning. Command of their army was given to Pohlmann, who had positioned his infantry to the east of the Maratha camp in the plains around the village of Assaye on the southern bank of the Juah.

To his surprise, Wellesley found the entire combined army before him. Nevertheless, he resolved to attack at once, believing that if he waited for Stevenson, the Marathas would have the chance to slip away and force the pursuit to drag on. Wellesley was also eager to forge a reputation for himself, and despite his numerical disadvantage, he was confident that the Maratha's irregular forces would be swept aside by his disciplined troops, and only Scindia's regular infantry could be expected to stand and fight.

== Battle ==
=== Initial manoeuvres ===
Map of the battle

Anthony Pohlmann struck camp and deployed his infantry battalions in a line facing southwards behind the steep banks of the Kaitna with his cannon arrayed directly in front. The great mass of Maratha cavalry was kept on the right flank and Berar's irregular infantry garrisoned Assaye to the rear. The only observable crossing point over the river was a small ford directly in front of the Maratha position. Pohlmann's strategy was to funnel the British and Madras troops across the ford into the mouth of his cannon, and then on to the massed infantry and cavalry behind. Wellesley's local guides assured him that there was no other ford nearby, but he quickly discarded the option of a frontal assault as suicide. While reconnoitring he had noticed two unguarded villages, Peepulgaon and Waroor, one on each bank of the Kaitna beyond the Maratha left. On the assumption that there must be a ford between the two villages, Wellesley ordered the area to be further reconnoitred by his chief engineer, Captain John Johnson, who reported that there was indeed a ford at that spot. Thus Wellesley led his army east to the crossing in an attempt to launch an attack on Pohlmann's left flank.

At around 15:00, the British crossed to the northern bank of the Kaitna unopposed apart from a distant harassing fire from the Maratha cannon, which was largely inaccurate but decapitated Wellesley's dragoon orderly. Once across, Wellesley ordered his six infantry battalions to form into two lines, with his cavalry as a reserve in a third. His allied Maratha and Mysore cavalry were ordered to remain south of the Kaitna to keep in check a large body of Maratha cavalry which hovered around the British rear. Pohlmann soon recognised Wellesley's intentions and swung his infantry and guns 90 degrees to establish a new line spread approximately 1 mile (1.6 km) across the isthmus with their right flank on the Kaitna and the left on Assaye. Although the new position secured the Maratha flanks, it restricted Pohlmann from bringing his superior numbers into action.

The Maratha redeployment was swifter and more efficient than Wellesley had anticipated, and he immediately extended his front to avoid being outflanked. A battalion of pickets and the 74th Highlanders, which formed the right of the first and second lines, were ordered to move obliquely to the right. This allowed the 78th Highlanders to anchor the left flank and Madras infantry battalions (the 1/10th, 1/8th, 1/4th and 2/12th) to form the centre of the British line. Wellesley's intention was to force back the Marathas from their guns and then—operating by his left to avoid the heavily defended Assaye—throw them back on the Juah and complete their destruction with his cavalry.

=== British infantry attack ===
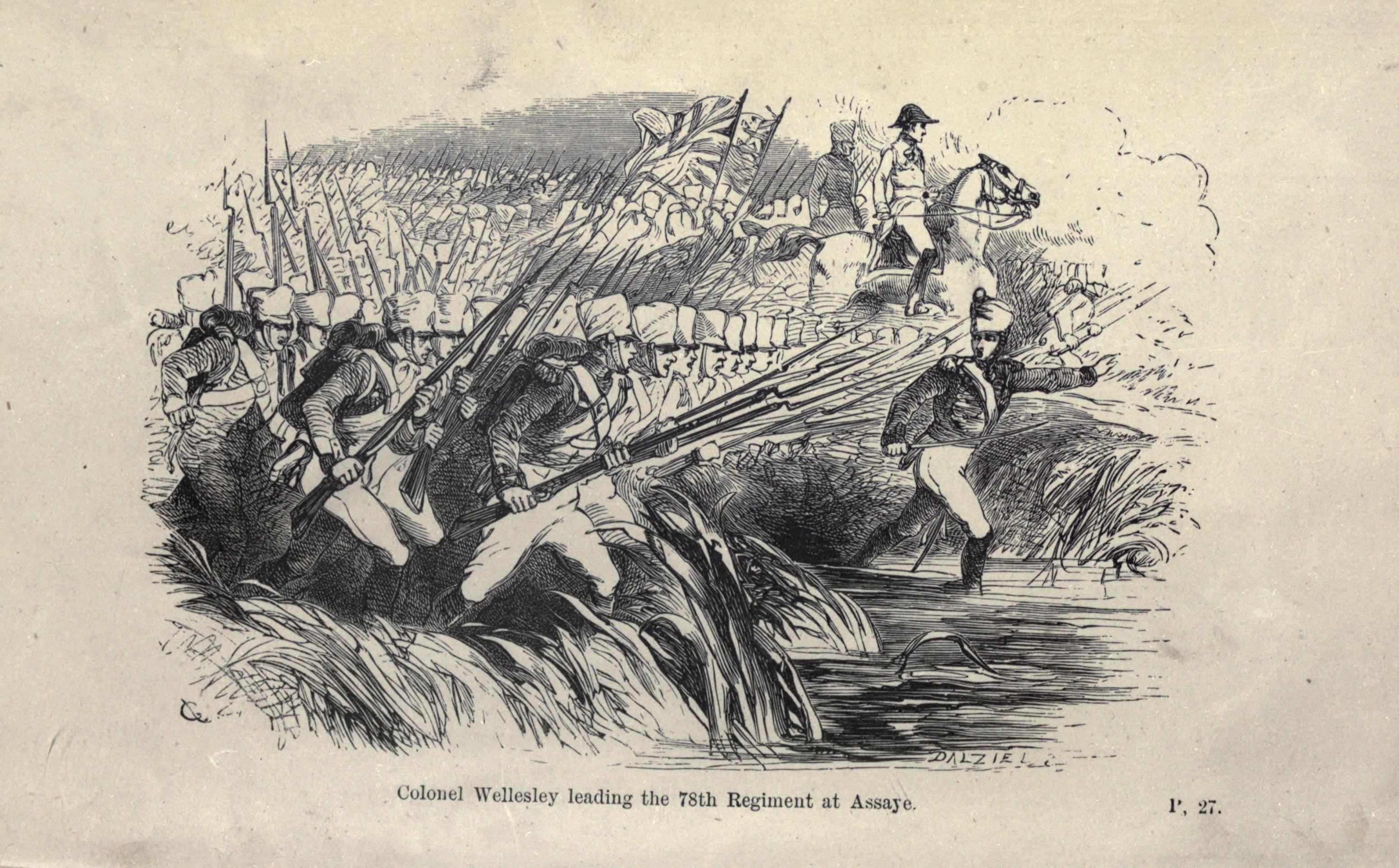
The 78th Regiment of Foot advancing

The Maratha cannonade intensified as the British redeployed. Although British artillery was brought forward to counter, it was ineffective against the mass firepower of the Maratha guns and quickly disabled through the weight of shot directed against it. British casualties mounted as the Maratha guns turned their attention to the infantry and subjected them to a barrage of canister, grape and round shot. Wellesley decided that his only option to neutralise the artillery and get his men out of the killing fields was to advance directly into the mouth of the Maratha artillery. He ordered his cannon to be abandoned and gave the command for his infantry to march forward with bayonets fixed.

The Maratha cannonade punched holes in the British line, but the infantry maintained a steady pace, closing up the gaps in their ranks as they advanced. The 78th Highlanders were the first to reach the enemy in the southern sector next to the River Kailna. They paused 50 yards (46 m) from the Maratha gunners and unleashed a volley of musket fire before launching into a bayonet charge. The four battalions of Madras infantry to the right of the 78th, accompanied by the Madras Pioneers, reached Pohlmann's line shortly afterwards and attacked in the same fashion. The gunners stood by their cannon but were no match for the bayonets of the British and Madras troops who swiftly pressed on towards the Maratha infantry. However, instead of meeting the charge, the Maratha right broke and fled northwards towards the Juah, causing the rest of the southern half of the line to follow. The officers of the Madras battalions temporarily lost control as the sepoys, encouraged by their success, pushed too far in pursuit. Maratha cavalry momentarily threatened to charge, but were checked by the 78th, who remained in order and re-formed to face the danger.

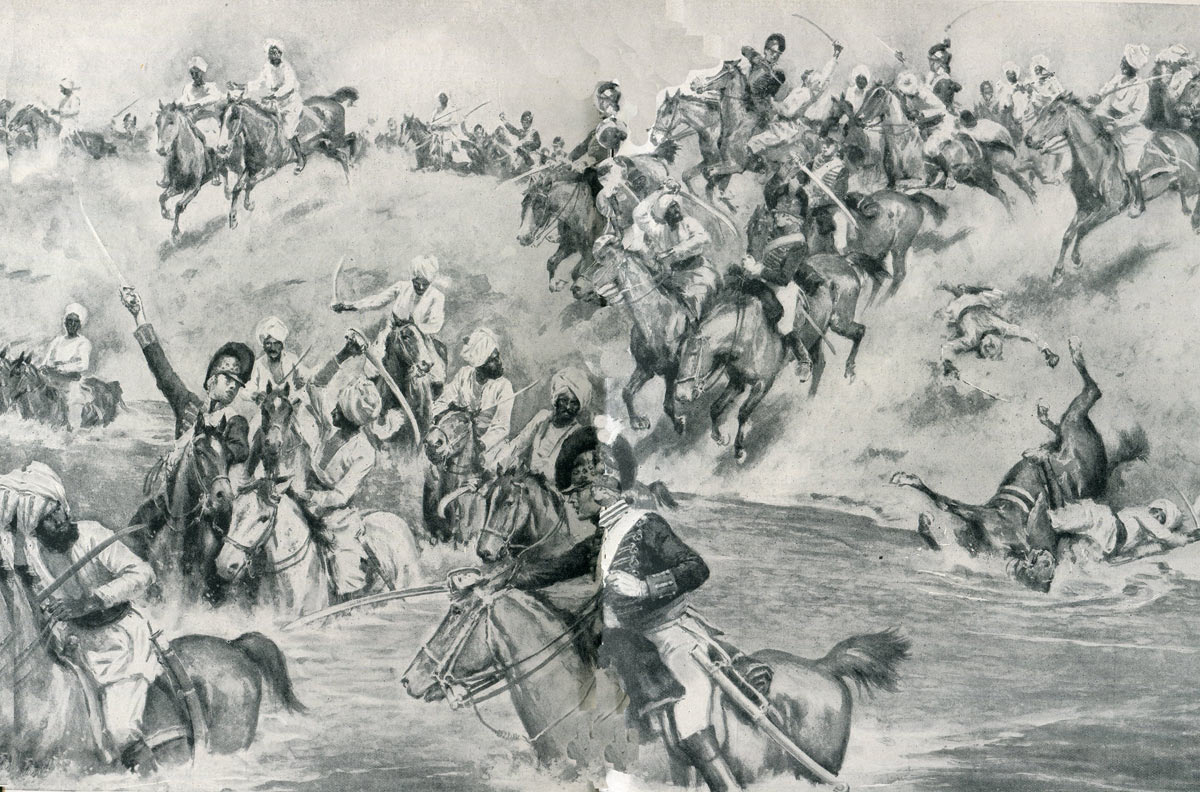
The 19th Light Dragoons attacking Maratha cavalry

In the northern sector of the battlefield however, Wellesley's right flank was in turmoil. The commander of the pickets, Lieutenant Colonel William Orrock, had mistaken his orders and continued his oblique path directly towards Assaye. Major Samuel Swinton of the 74th Regiment was ordered to support the pickets and followed close behind. This created a large gap in the centre of the British line and brought the two battalions under a barrage of cannonade from the artillery around the village and the Maratha left. The two battalions began to fall back in disarray, and Pohlmann ordered his remaining infantry and cavalry forward to attack. The Marathas gave no quarter; the pickets were virtually annihilated, but the remnants of the 74th were able to form a rough square behind hastily piled bodies of dead. Realising that the destruction of his right would leave his army exposed and outflanked, Wellesley ordered a detachment of British cavalry under Colonel Patrick Maxwell, consisting of the 19th Light Dragoons and elements of the 4th and 5th Madras Native Cavalry, into action. From their position at the rear, the cavalry dashed directly towards the 74th's square, crashed into the swarming attackers and routed them. Maxwell pressed his advantage and continued his charge into the Maratha infantry and guns on the right, driving them backwards and across the Juah "with great slaughter".

=== Culmination ===
A number of Maratha gunners who had feigned death when the British advanced over their position re-manned their guns and began to pour cannon fire into the rear of the 74th and Madras infantry. Wellesley ordered his four sepoy battalions to re-form and ward off any threat from the Maratha infantry and cavalry while the 78th were sent back to retake the Maratha gun line. Wellesley, meanwhile, galloped back to 7th Madras Native Cavalry, which had been held back in reserve to the east, and led a cavalry charge from the opposite direction. The gunners again stood their ground but were eventually driven from their guns and this time it was ensured that all those who remained were dead.

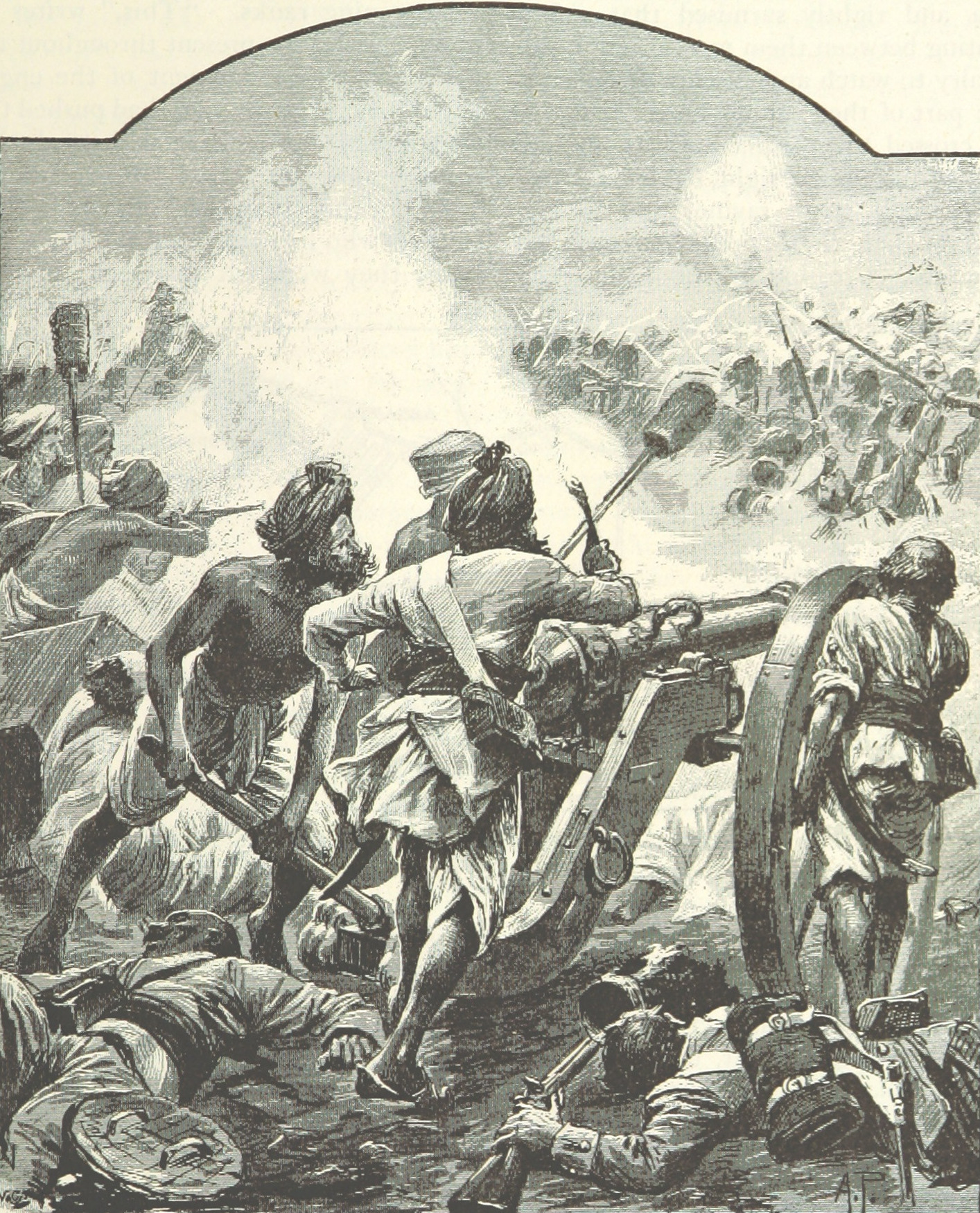
Maratha gunners re-manning their guns and firing into the 74th's rear

While Wellesley was preoccupied with re-taking the gun line, Pohlmann rallied his infantry and redeployed them into a semicircle with their backs to the Juah; their right flank across the river and their left in Assaye. However, most of the Maratha cannon, which had inflicted heavy losses on Wellesley's infantry, had been captured or lay abandoned on the battlefield. Reluctant to join the fray, the Maratha cavalry lingered in the distance to the west. Most were Pindaris, loosely organised and lightly armed cavalry whose traditional role was to chase routing troops, harass supply lines and raid enemy territory. They were not trained to attack well-formed infantry or heavily armed cavalry, and did not play a further part in the battle.

With the remanned Maratha artillery silenced, Wellesley turned his attention to Pohlmann's reformed infantry. Although Maxwell had suffered heavy losses, he had rallied his cavalry and returned to the field of battle. Wellesley ordered him to charge the Maratha left flank, while the infantry moved forward as a single line to meet the centre and right. The cavalry spurred forward but were met with a volley of canister shot which struck Maxwell, killing him instantly. Their momentum lost, the cavalry did not complete their charge, but veered away from the Maratha line at the last moment. The British and Madras infantry marched on against the Maratha position. Pohlmann's men, their morale low, did not wait for the attack and instead retreated northwards across the Juah. Maratha sources claim the line marched away from the battlefield in an orderly manner on Pohlmann's orders, but British accounts claim the Maratha infantry fled in an uncontrolled panic. Berar's irregulars inside Assaye, now leaderless and having witnessed the fate of the regular infantry, abandoned the village and marched off northwards at around 18:00, followed shortly afterwards by the Maratha cavalry. Wellesley's troops were exhausted and in no condition to pursue, and the native allied cavalry which had remained on the south bank of the Kailna and had not been engaged, refused to pursue without the support of the British and Madras cavalry.

== Aftermath ==
"The whole country [was] strewn with killed and wounded, both Europeans and natives, ours as well as the enemies."

— — An unnamed British cavalry officer in the aftermath of Assaye

British casualties amounted to 428 killed, 1,138 wounded and 18 missing; a total of 1,584 – over a third of the force engaged in combat. The 74th and the picket battalion were decimated; from a strength of about 500, the 74th lost ten officers killed and seven wounded, and 124 other ranks killed and 270 wounded. The pickets lost all their officers except their commander, Lieutenant Colonel William Orrock, and had only about 75 men remaining. Of the ten officers forming the general's staff, eight were wounded or had their horses killed. Wellesley himself lost two horses; the first was shot from underneath him and the second was speared as he led the charge to re-capture the Maratha gun line.

The number of Maratha casualties is more difficult to ascertain. Despatches from British officers give a figure of 1,200 dead and many more wounded but some modern historians have estimated a total of 6,000 dead and wounded. The Marathas also surrendered seven stands of colours, large amounts of stores and ammunition and 98 cannon, most of which were later taken into service by the East India Company. Although Scindia and Berar's army was not finished as a fighting force, several of Scindia's regular infantry battalions and artillery crews had been destroyed. Their command structure had also been damaged: many of their European officers, including Colonel Pohlmann and Major Dupont, surrendered to the Company—which had offered amnesty to Europeans in the service of the Maratha armies—or deserted and sought employment with other native chieftains.

The sound of the guns at Assaye was heard by Stevenson who immediately broke up his camp 10 miles (16 km) to the west in an attempt to join the battle. However, he was misled by his guide and marched first on Borkardan before he reached the battlefield on the evening of 24 September. Suspecting that his guide had intentionally led him astray, Stevenson later had him hanged. He remained with Wellesley to assist with the wounded – troops were still being carried from the battlefield four days after the engagement – until ordered to recommence the pursuit of the Maratha army on 26 September. Wellesley remained to the south while he established a hospital at Ajanta and awaited reinforcements from Poona. Two months later, he combined with Stevenson to rout Scindia and Berar's demoralised and weakened army at Argaon, and shortly afterwards stormed Berar's fortress at Gawilghur. These victories, coupled with Lieutenant General Lake's successful campaign in the north, induced the two Maratha chiefs to sue for peace.

Assaye elephant emblem awarded to the Madras Sappers

Wellesley later told Stevenson that "I should not like to see again such a loss as I sustained on the 23rd September, even if attended by such a gain", and in later life he referred to Assaye as "the bloodiest for the numbers that I ever saw". Lieutenant Colonel Thomas Munro, the Company's district collector at Mysore, was critical of the high proportion of casualties and questioned Wellesley's decision not to wait for Stevenson. He wrote to Wellesley: "I am tempted to think that you did it with a view of sharing the glory with the smallest numbers". In response, Wellesley politely rebuffed Munro's accusations and defended his action as necessary because he had received and acted upon incorrect intelligence regarding the Maratha position. Assaye was 34-year-old Wellesley's first major success and despite his anguish over the heavy losses, it was a battle he always held in the highest estimation. After his retirement from active military service, the Duke of Wellington (as he later became known) considered Assaye the finest thing he ever did in the way of fighting even when compared to his later military career.

Lord Mornington and his Council lauded the battle as a "most brilliant and important victory", and presented each of the Madras units and British regiments involved in the engagement with a set of honorary colours. The British regiments and native units were also awarded the Assaye battle honour and most were later given permission to adopt an Assaye elephant as part of their insignia. A public monument was also erected by the East India Company at Fort William, Calcutta to commemorate the victory. The 74th Regiment of foot later became known as the Assaye regiment due to their stand at the battle and their modern-day successors, the Royal Highland Fusiliers (2 SCOTS), still celebrate the anniversary of the battle each year. Of the native infantry battalions, only the Madras Sappers survive in their original form in the Indian Army but they no longer celebrate Assaye as it has been declared a repugnant battle honour by the Government of India.

== In fiction ==
Bernard Cornwell's fictional character Richard Sharpe earned his battlefield promotion to officer's rank by saving Wellesley's life at the Battle of Assaye. The novel Sharpe's Triumph (HarperCollins, 1998, ISBN 0-00-225630-4) depicts the campaign and the battle in detail. Both men's memories of Assaye are mentioned several more times throughout the series as Sharpe and Wellington's careers progress. The television adaptation differs and depicts Sharpe saving Wellesley's life from French soldiers in Spain during the later Peninsular War.

== Bibliography ==
- Bennell, Anthony S. (1998), The Maratha War Papers of Arthur Wellesley, Stroud: Sutton Publishing, ISBN 0-7509-2069-6
- Biddulph, John (1899), The Nineteenth and their times, London: Murray
- Black, Jeremy (1999), Britain as a Military Power, 1688–1815, London: Routledge, ISBN 1-85728-772-X
- Bradshaw, John (1894), Sir Thomas Munro and the British Settlement of the Madras Presidency, Rulers of India series, Oxford: Clarendon Press, ISBN 81-206-1871-8
- Cooper, Randolph G. S. (2003), The Anglo-Maratha Campaigns and the Contest for India, Cambridge: Cambridge University Press, ISBN 0-521-82444-3
- Corrigan, Gordon (2006), Wellington: A Military Life, London: Continuum International Publishing Group, ISBN 1-85285-515-0
- Gurwood, John, ed. (1837), The dispatches of Field Marshal the Duke of Wellington from 1799 to 1818, vol. II, London: Murray, ISBN 0-548-60472-X
- Holmes, Richard (2003), Wellington: The Iron Duke, London: HarperCollins, ISBN 0-00-713750-8
- Millar, Simon (2006), Assaye 1803: Wellington's First and 'Bloodiest' Victory, Oxford: Osprey Publishing, ISBN 1-84603-001-3
- Roy, Kaushik (2004), India's Historic Battles: From Alexander the Great to Kargil, Hyderabad: Orient Blackswan, ISBN 81-7824-109-9
- Sandes, Lt Col E.W.C. (1933), The Military Engineer in India, Vol I, Chatham, Great Britain: Institution of the Royal Engineers
- Sandes, Lt Col E.W.C. (1948), The Indian Sappers and Miners, Chatham, Great Britain: Institution of the Royal Engineers
- Severn, John Kenneth (2007), Architects of Empire: The Duke of Wellington and His Brothers, Oklahoma City: University of Oklahoma Press, ISBN 978-0-8061-3810-7
- Singh, Sarbans (1993), Battle Honours of the Indian Army 1757–1971, New Delhi: Vision Books, ISBN 81-7094-115-6
- Thorn, William (1818), Memoir of the War in India, London: Thomas Egerton
- Weller, Jac (1972), Wellington in India, London: Longman, ISBN 0-582-12784-X
- Wellesley, Gerald, ed. (1956), The Conversations of the First Duke of Wellington with George William Chad, Cambridge: Saint Nicolas Press
