= Royal Highland Fusiliers =

Scottish infantry battalion

Royal Highland Fusiliers, 2nd Battalion, Royal Regiment of Scotland
- Cap badge
- Active: 20 January 1959–present
- Country: United Kingdom
- Branch: British Army
- Type: Infantry
- Size: Battalion; 628 personnel
- Part of: 4th Light Brigade Combat Team
- Garrison/HQ: Glencorse Barracks, Penicuik
- Motto: Nemo Me Impune Lacessit (No One Assails Me With Impunity)
- March: Whistle o'er the Lave o't/The British Grenadiers
- Anniversaries: Assaye (23 September)

Insignia
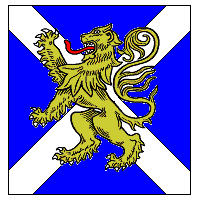
- Tactical recognition flash

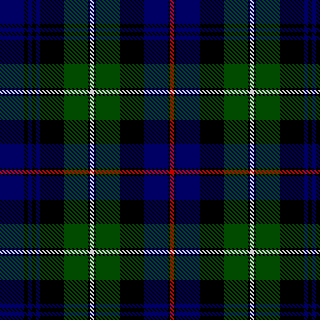
- Tartan: HLI Mackenzie
- Hackle: White; From Royal Scots Fusiliers

The Royal Highland Fusiliers, 2nd Battalion, Royal Regiment of Scotland (2 SCOTS) is an infantry battalion of the Royal Regiment of Scotland.

Prior to 28 March 2006, the Royal Highland Fusiliers was an infantry regiment in its own right, created by the amalgamation of the Royal Scots Fusiliers with the Highland Light Infantry (City of Glasgow Regiment) in January 1959.

== History ==
The regiment was formed as the Royal Highland Fusiliers (Princess Margaret's Own Glasgow and Ayrshire Regiment) on 20 January 1959 by the amalgamation of the Royal Scots Fusiliers with the Highland Light Infantry (City of Glasgow Regiment). The Royal Highland Fusiliers, abbreviated as 'The RHF', were part of the Scottish Division.

The regiment was initially based at Redford Barracks in Edinburgh before being deployed to Singapore Lines in Aden in 1960. The regimental band played at independence ceremonies in Hargeisa in 1960. It was then posted to St. Patricks barracks in Malta in 1961, to Mons Barracks in Iserlohn in 1963, to Cyprus as part of the United Nations Peacekeeping Force in Cyprus for six months in 1965 and to Fort George in 1967.

In 1968 the regiment was deployed to Gibraltar for six months on frontier duties after General Franco closed the frontier between Spain and Gibraltar and then undertook five tours in Northern Ireland during the Troubles in the 1970s. It relocated to Kiwi Barracks at Bulford Camp in 1970. After a two-year posting to Malaysia, the regiment returned to Redford Barracks in 1973 moving on to Barrosa Barracks at Hemer in 1979.

The regiment were at the Palace Barracks at Holywood in 1983, Berlin in 1985 and briefly back in Redford Barracks before going to Oakington Barracks at Cambridge in 1989. After taking part in the Gulf War in 1991, the regiment moved to St Barbara Barracks at Fallingbostel in 1993 from where it deployed units to Bosnia in 1994 and to Macedonia and Kosovo in 1999.

The regiment moved back to Fort George in July 2000 and to Salamanca Barracks in Cyprus in September 2003. The battalion was involved in Operation TELIC IV in Iraq in Summer 2004 and then in Operation TELIC VI in Iraq in Spring 2006.

As part of the Delivering Security in a Changing World Review of the Armed Forces, the regiment was amalgamated with the other regiments of the Scottish Division to become the 2nd Battalion of the Royal Regiment of Scotland which was formed on 28 March 2006. The battalion moved to Glencorse Barracks in Penicuik at the same time.

In Summer 2015 units of the battalion were deployed to Afghanistan to train the Afghan National Army.

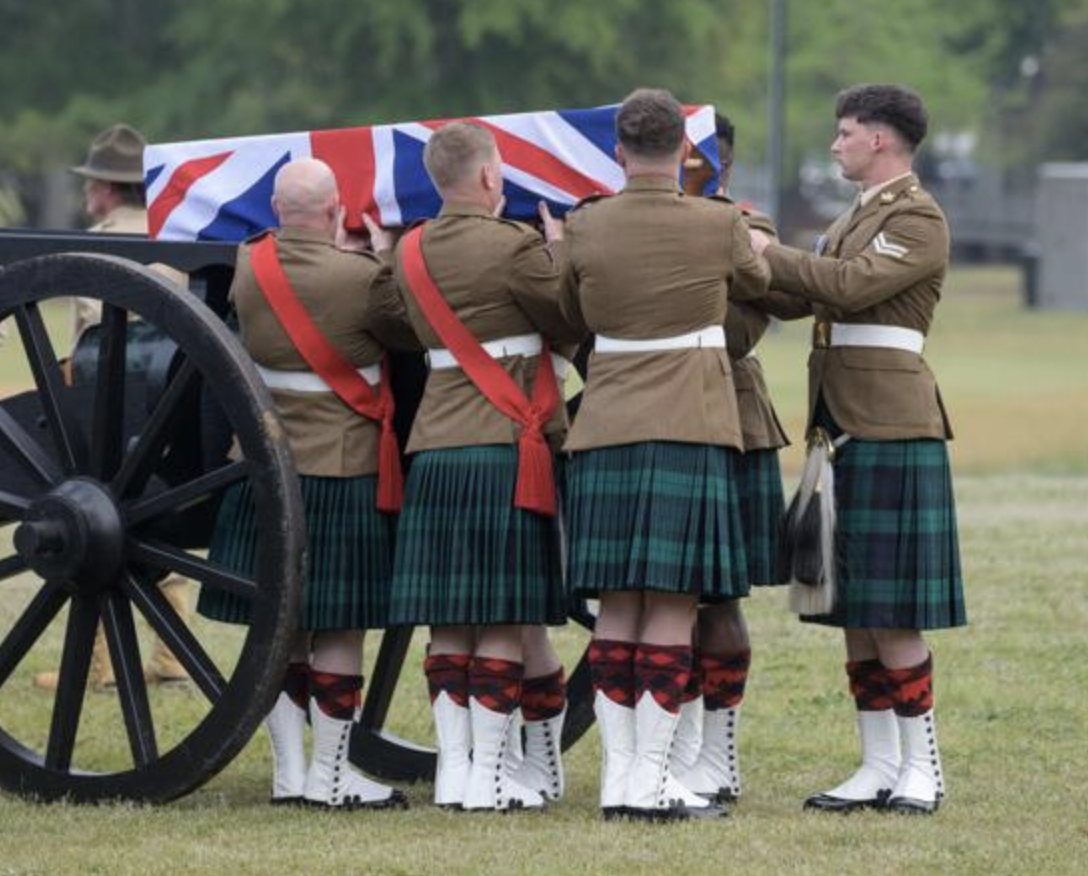
Reburial service in Camden of a British soldier whose remains were discovered in 2022.

Following the Army 2020 Refine, the battalion was assigned to the 51st Infantry Brigade and Headquarters Scotland as a light infantry battalion. In addition the changes, the reserve 6th (52nd Lowland) Battalion The Royal Regiment of Scotland was paired with them. On 1 August 2019, the Field Army was re-organised, and the battalion along with the 6th battalion moved under command of the 4th Infantry Brigade and Headquarters North East.

In April 2023 members of the battalion took part in the reburial of a British Soldier from the 71st Regiment of Foot, Fraser's Highlanders killed at the Battle of Camden in August 1780.

== Regimental heritage ==
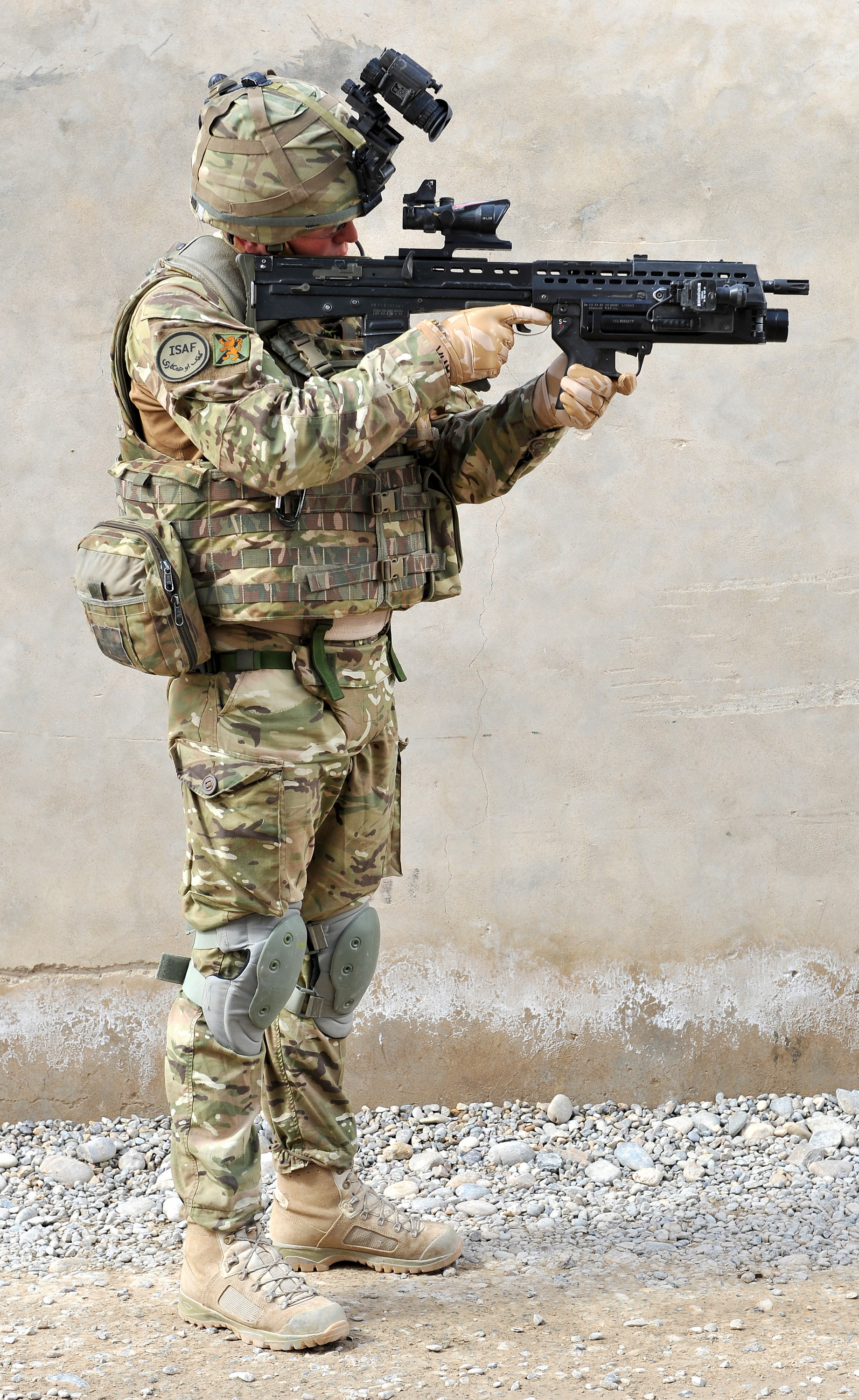
A Royal Highland Fusilier in Helmand Province, Afghanistan.

The regiment and current battalion has the distinction among British infantry regiments of carrying three Colours on parade. In addition to the Queen's and Regimental Colours, the third – the Assaye Colour, was originally awarded by the Governor General in Council in India on behalf of the British East India Company to the 74th Highland Regiment for distinguished service at the Battle of Assaye in India in 1803 while under the command of Arthur Wellesley, the future Duke of Wellington.

The regiment maintained the traditions of the long 'Attention' command being given on parade (rather than the modern abbreviated Army 'shun') and of referring to the Commanding Officer's orders (disciplinary parade) as 'haul up' from the days of the unit acting as escorts to prisoners being transported to the colonies. Officers wore red 'infantry' piping on the epaulettes of their greatcoats, a detail inherited from the Royal Scots Fusiliers and mentioned by Boris Pasternak in his book Doctor Zhivago, but long lost to other infantry regiments.

The regiment's uniform included the blue Glengarry cap with red 'tourie', red, white and green dicing, black silk cockade and 'flaming grenade' cap badge, Mackenzie tartan trews and black highland brogue shoes worn with white spats. In the field in combat dress, the Glengarry was replaced, when a helmet is not worn, by a khaki 'tam o'shanter' bonnet with Mackenzie tartan patch and with a white hackle from the Royal Scots Fusiliers when appropriate. The Regimental capbadge was the 'grenade in flames' taken from the Royal Scots Fusiliers cap badge, on which is mounted the crowned HLI monogram from the Highland Light Infantry. The tartan is 'Mackenzie', the blue and green 'government' tartan with added white and red lines.

== Battle honours ==
The regiment has been awarded over 200 battle honours, from Blenheim to the Gulf War, gained in every major and many minor conflicts, campaigns and theatres of war since the 21st Regiment's first engagement at the Battle of Walcourt in 1689, a number unsurpassed by any other unit in the British Army.

The regiment's battle honours include: Blenheim (August 1704 – War of the Spanish Succession), Assaye (September 1803 – Mahratta War), The Storming of Badajos (April 1812 – Peninsular War), Vitoria (June 1813 – Peninsular War), Waterloo (July 1815), Inkerman (November 1854 – Crimean War) and Gheluvelt (October 1914 – World War 1 – France). 44 battle honours are carried on the Regimental Colour, 29 on the Queens Colour and 2: Seringapatam and Assaye, on the Assaye Colour.

== Colonels-in-Chief ==
- 1959–2002: Princess Margaret, Countess of Snowdon, CI, GCVO
- 2003–2022: Prince Andrew, Duke of York, KG, KCVO, CD, ADC

== Regimental colonels ==
Colonels of the regiment were:

- 1959: Maj-Gen. Ronald Albert Bramwell-Davis, CB, DSO (ex Highland Light Infantry)
- 1959–1964: Brig. Archibald Ian Buchanan-Dunlop, CBE, DSO (Associate Colonel) (ex Royal Scots Fusiliers)
- 1964–1969: Maj-Gen. Henry Lowther Ewart Clark Leask, DSO, OBE
- 1969–1979: Maj-Gen. Charles Whish Dunbar, CBE
- 1979–1991: Maj-Gen. Robert Leslie Stuart Green
- 1991–1997: Brig. Iain Stuart Reid, OBE
- 1997–2003: Maj-Gen. Angus Iain Ramsay, CBE, DSO
- 2003–2006: Maj-Gen. William Euan Buchanan Loudon, CBE
- 2006: Regiment amalgamated with The Royal Scots, The King's Own Scottish Borderers, The Black Watch, The Highlanders (Seaforth, Gordons and Camerons) and The Argyll and Sutherland Highlanders to form The Royal Regiment of Scotland

== Pipe band ==
In the Royal Highland Fusiliers' Pipes and Drums band, pipers wear the all-blue Cameron pattern Glengarry with Dress Erskine tartan kilt, drummers also wear the kilt but retain the diced Glengarry as do buglers who wear Mackenzie tartan trews. The band members wear a different type of capbadge in which the Regimental 'flaming grenade' capbadge is superimposed on the saltire of St Andrew and the star of the Order of the Thistle. The Drum major wears Mackenzie tartan trews, fusilier officer's full dress pattern scarlet doublet and bearskin with a grenade cap badge and white hackle. Like all corps of drums and pipes and drums within the British Army, the pd are regular soldiers and pipers/drummers second. The corps currently operate as assault pioneers trained in explosives and entrances.

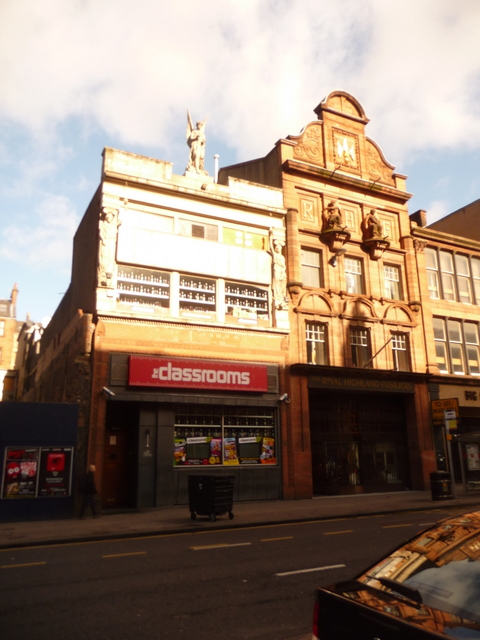
The Home Headquarters and Museum of the Royal Highland Fusiliers on Sauchiehall Street in Glasgow.

== Regimental headquarters and museum ==
The Charles Rennie Mackintosh designed regimental headquarters and museum is operated by the Regimental Secretary and located near Charing Cross at Sauchiehall Street in Glasgow. The battalion's recruitment team is also based at Walcheren Barracks in the Maryhill district of Glasgow. A regimental magazine is also published, The Journal of the Royal Highland Fusiliers. There are also various old comrades groups and associations linked to the current and antecedent Regiments of the RHF.

== Alliances ==
- Canada – The Royal Highland Fusiliers of Canada
- New Zealand – The Royal New Zealand Infantry Regiment
- Pakistan – 11th Battalion, The Baloch Regiment
- South Africa – Chief Maqoma Regiment
- United Kingdom – Inkerman Company, West Lowland Battalion ACF

== See also ==
- Armed forces in Scotland
- Military history of Scotland
