= Governor Stevenson =

Governor Stevenson may refer to:

- Adlai Stevenson II (1900–1965), 31st Governor of Illinois
- Charles C. Stevenson (1826–1890), 5th Governor of Nevada
- Coke R. Stevenson (1888–1975), 35th Governor of Texas
- Edward A. Stevenson (1831–1895), 11th Governor of Idaho Territory
- James Stevenson (East India Company officer) (died 1805), temporary district governor of Mysore in 1800
- John W. Stevenson (1812–1886), 25th Governor of Kentucky
- Malcolm Stevenson (1878–1927), Governor of Cyprus from 1925 to 1926 and Governor of the Seychelles in 1927
- William Stevenson (colonial administrator) (1805–1863), 9th Governor of British Mauritius
- William E. Stevenson (1820–1883), 3rd Governor of West Virginia
