= 74th (Highland) Regiment of Foot =

- Active: 1787–1881
- Country: Kingdom of Great Britain (1787–1800); United Kingdom (1801–1881)
- Branch: British Army
- Type: Infantry
- Size: One battalion
- Garrison/HQ: Hamilton Barracks
- Engagements: Third Anglo-Mysore War; Fourth Anglo-Mysore War; First Anglo-Maratha War; Second Anglo-Maratha War; Napoleonic Wars; Eighth Xhosa War; Indian Rebellion

The 74th (Highland) Regiment of Foot was a British Army line infantry regiment, raised in 1787. Under the Childers Reforms it amalgamated with the 71st (Highland) Regiment of Foot to form the Highland Light Infantry in 1881.

== History ==
=== Formation ===
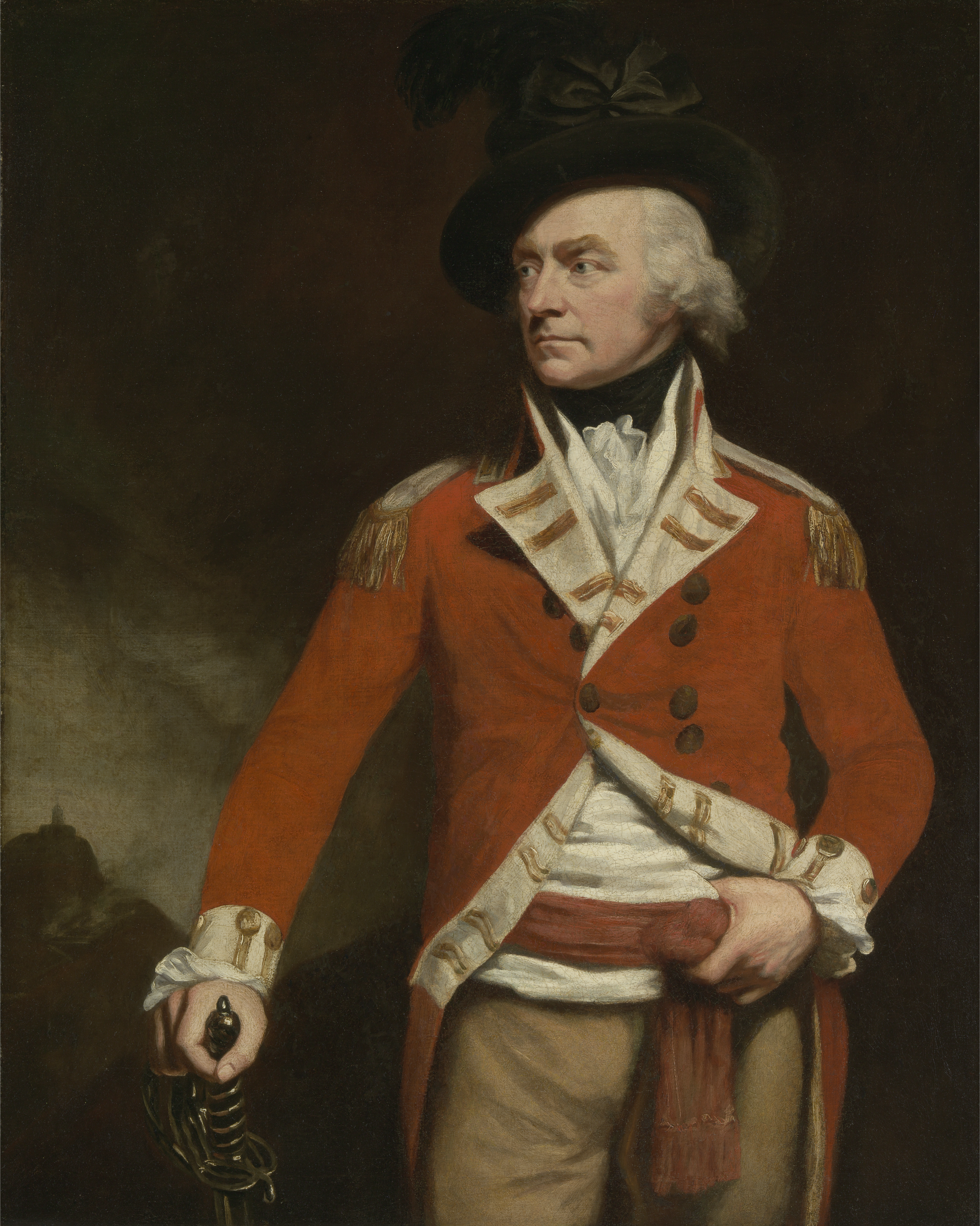
c. 1796 portrait of a regimental officer

The regiment was raised in Glasgow by Major-General Sir Archibald Campbell for service in India as the 74th (Highland) Regiment of Foot in October 1787. In accordance with the Declaratory Act 1788 the cost of raising the regiment was recharged to East India Company on the basis that the act required that expenses "should be defrayed out of the revenues" arising there. The regiment embarked for India in February 1789 and took part in the siege of Bangalore in February 1791 and the siege of Seringapatam in February 1792 during the Third Anglo-Mysore War.

The regiment also saw action at the Battle of Mallavelly in March 1799 and went on to form part of the storming party at the siege of Seringapatam in April 1799 during the Fourth Anglo-Mysore War. It subsequently saw action at skirmishes in spring 1803 during the First Anglo-Maratha War and went on to fight at the Battle of Assaye in April 1803 during the Second Anglo-Maratha War: at Assaye the regiment suffered terrible losses under a hail of cannon fire. From a strength of about 500, the 74th lost ten officers killed and seven wounded, and 124 other ranks killed and 270 wounded. The regiment went to fight at the Battle of Argaon in November 1803 and the Capture of Gawilghur in December 1803. It returned to England in February 1806 and then lost its Highland status due to recruiting difficulties, becoming the 74th Regiment of Foot in April 1809.

=== Napoleonic Wars ===
The regiment embarked for Portugal in January 1810 for service in the Peninsular War. It saw action at the Battle of Bussaco in September 1810, the Battle of Fuentes de Oñoro in May 1811 and the Battle of El Bodón in September 1811, before further combat at the siege of Ciudad Rodrigo in January 1812, the siege of Badajoz in March 1812 and the Battle of Salamanca in July 1812. It also fought at the siege of Burgos in September 1812 and the Battle of Vitoria in June 1813. It then pursued the French army into France and saw action at the Battle of the Pyrenees in July 1813, the Battle of Nivelle in November 1813 and the Battle of the Nive in December 1813. After that it fought at the Battle of Orthez in February 1814 and the Battle of Toulouse in April 1814 before embarking for Ireland in June 1814.

=== The Victorian era ===
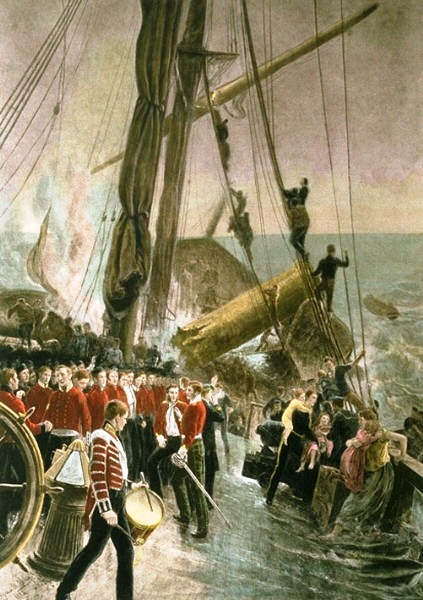
"The Wreck of the Birkenhead" (ca 1892) by Thomas Hemy

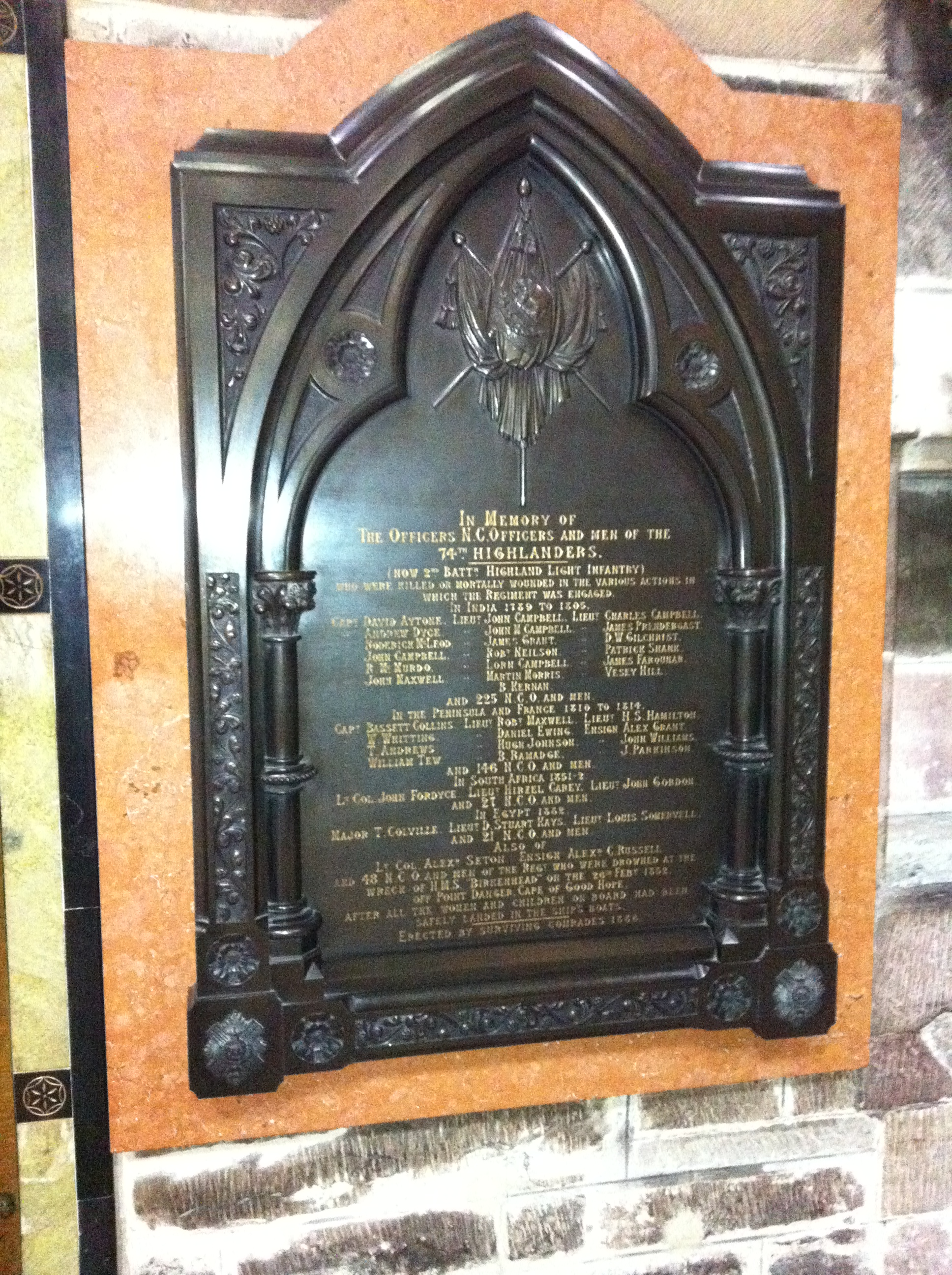
Memorial to the men of the 74th Highlanders in St Giles' Cathedral, Edinburgh, erected 1886

The regiment embarked from Ireland for Halifax, Nova Scotia in May 1818: on arrival units were detached for service in St. John's, Newfoundland and Labrador and Saint John, New Brunswick. The regiment moved on to Bermuda in August 1828 and then returned home in December 1829. The regiment embarked for Barbados in September 1834 and, after arrival there, moved on to Grenada in December 1834. The regiment transferred to Antigua in November 1835: it was then split into two formations which were deployed to Dominica and to Saint Lucia in February 1837. The regiment moved on to Quebec in Canada in May 1841 before embarking for home and landing at Deal in March 1845. Later that year it reverted to its earlier name as the 74th (Highland) Regiment of Foot. The commanding officer, Colonel Eyre Crabbe, was able to assure the Commander-in-Chief of the Forces, the Duke of Wellington, "that throughout the varied services and changes of so many years, a strong national feeling, and a connection with Scotland by recruiting, had been constantly maintained."

The regiment then sailed to the Cape Colony in 1851 to take part in the Eighth Xhosa War. In 1852 a detachment from the regiment departed Simon's Town aboard the troopship HMS Birkenhead bound for Port Elizabeth. At two o'clock in the morning on 28 February 1852, the ship struck rocks at Danger Point, just off Gansbaai. The troops assembled on deck, and allowed the women and children to board the lifeboats first, but then stood firm as the ship sank when told by officers that jumping overboard and swimming to the lifeboats would mostly likely upset those boats and endanger the civilian passengers. 357 men drowned. The regiment's commanding officer, Lieutenant Colonel Alexander Seton, together with one of his ensigns and forty-eight of his other ranks, were among those that perished.

The regiment embarked for India in 1854 and helped to suppress the Indian Rebellion in 1857 before returning home in 1864. It was deployed to Gibraltar in 1868, to Malta in 1872 and to the Straits Settlements in 1876. It went on to Hong Kong in 1878 before returning to the Straits Settlements in 1879 and returning home in 1880.

As part of the Cardwell Reforms of the 1870s, where single-battalion regiments were linked together to share a single depot and recruiting district in the United Kingdom, the 74th was linked with the 26th (Cameronian) Regiment of Foot, and assigned to district no. 59 at Hamilton Barracks. On 1 July 1881 the Childers Reforms came into effect and the regiment amalgamated with the 71st (Highland) Regiment of Foot to become the 2nd battalion, Highland Light Infantry.

== Battle honours ==
Battle honours won by the regiment were:

- Fourth Anglo-Mysore War: Seringapatam
- Second Anglo-Maratha War: Assaye (elephant superscribed Assaye)
- Peninsular War: Busaco, Fuentes D'Onor, Ciudad Rodrigo, Badajoz, Salamanca, Vittoria, Pyrenees, Nivelle, Orthes, Toulouse, Peninsula

== Colonels of the Regiment ==
Colonels of the Regiment were:

=== 74th (Highland) Regiment of Foot ===
- 1787–1791: Maj-Gen. Sir Archibald Campbell of Inverneill, KB
- 1791–1801: Gen. Charles O'Hara
- 1802–1806: Gen. The Lord Hutchison, GCB
- 1806–1809: Lt-Gen. Sir John Stuart, Count of Maida, GCB

=== 74th Regiment of Foot – (1809) ===
- 1809–1813: Gen. Sir Alexander Hope, GCB
- 1813–1823: Lt-Gen. James Montgomerie
- 1823–1834: Gen. Hon. Sir Charles Colville
- 1834–1835: Maj-Gen. Sir James Campbell, KCB, KCH
- 1835–1846: Gen. Sir Phineas Riall, KCH

=== 74th (Highland) Regiment of Foot – (1845) ===
- 1846–1850: Maj-Gen. Sir Alexander Cameron, KCB
- 1850–1856: Lt-Gen. Alexander Thomson
- 1856–1876: Gen. Charles Augustus Shawe
- 1876: Lt-Gen. Sir Percy Egerton Herbert, KCB
- 1876–1881: Gen. Walter Douglas Phillips Patton-Bethune

== Sources ==
- Cannon, Richard (1851). Historical Record of the Seventy-Fourth Regiment (Highlanders) containing account of the formation of the regiment in 1787 and of its subsequent services to 1850. London: Parker, Furnivall and Parker.
- Meikle, William (1919). Illustrated guide to St. Giles' Cathedral, Edinburgh, and the Chapel of the Thistle. Kessinger Publishing.
- Weller, Jac (1972), Wellington in India, London: Longman, ISBN 0-582-12784-X
