= Alexander Adams (British Army officer) =

British Army general

Lieutenant-General Alexander Adams
- Born: c. 1772
- Died: 12 September 1834
- Military career
- Allegiance: (United Kingdom) Great Britain
- Branch: British Army
- Unit: 78th Highlanders
- Conflicts: Second Anglo-Maratha War

Lieutenant-General Alexander Adams (baptised 4 April 1772 – 12 September 1834) was a British Army officer. He distinguished himself in the Second Anglo-Maratha War, serving with the 78th Highlanders in India. His commander, General Wellesley (later Duke of Wellington), thanked him for his services on several occasions. After the 1811 invasion of Java, he was appointed to a command in the army, and also as minister at the court of the emperor or Susuhunan Pakubuwono IV.

== Family ==
Alexander Adams was born into an ancient landed Pembrokeshire family in Holyland, Pembrokeshire, the son of Major Joseph Adams and Elizabeth (née Campbell) Adams.

== Military service ==
=== Gibraltar ===
Adams originally joined the Queen's Royals as an ensign, and served in that regiment as a lieutenant and adjutant, or acting adjutant, for a considerable time, chiefly at Gibraltar, a period he remembered with much pleasure.

=== India ===
He joined the 78th Highlanders, not long after its formation, with the rank of captain. Around 1796, he was the paymaster of the regiment in Bengal. He trained the men using David Dundas's then little-known drill-book of 1788 as a guide and is credited with instilling a high degree of discipline. He was promoted to major and given command of the regiment at Fort William, Bengal, in 1801.

During the Second Anglo-Maratha War of 1803, the 78th was sent via Bombay to Poona to join a division of the Madras Army commanded by Major-General Arthur Wellesley (later Duke of Wellington). Wellesley, by an extraordinary march, had saved the city from destruction.

Adams distinguished himself at the successful escalade of the Pettah of Ahmednagar. During the heat of the action, the 78th, on the extreme left of the line and somewhat separated from it, had to charge a double column of regular infantry and artillery, while keeping a large body of cavalry in check on the left and, at the same time, being fired upon from the rear by their own guns. The 78th's guns, left behind by the necessity of closing quickly with the enemy, had been seized and turned against them by a party that had passed through the gap between the 78th and the rest of the brigade, along with some stragglers. Once the 78th had captured the enemy guns to its front, General Wellesley rode up and instructed Lieutenant-Colonel Adams to "face about, and drive those fellows from our guns", which was immediately done.

In his next general action, Adams was engaged against the combined armies of Scindiah and the Rajah of Berar at Argaum on 29 November later the same year. Here he took command of the leading brigade, owing to the illness of the unit's brigadier, who soon after died. The enemy troops were drawn up in an extended line, flanked by masses of cavalry, on a gently sloping plain. They permitted the British column to advance parallel to their front to within a very short distance without opposition. Having concentrated the greater number of their guns to bear upon one point of the road in front of a mud-walled village, the enemy suddenly opened fire on the leading battalions of sepoys, causing them to give way. General Wellesley, riding up to ascertain the situation, gave his directions, which were implemented by Adams, to lead the column round by the other side of the village. The natives were rallied behind this shelter, formed a line, and charged. Several hundred of the devoted sect of Gossains advanced to meet them, discharged their firearms, and attacked with swords the 78th and the remains of the 74th Regiment (which had suffered severely in the former action), but were wiped out. The British were soon in possession of the field, artillery, baggage, and all. After this achievement, Wellesley expressed his appreciation of Adams's conduct.

Adams also participated in the subsequent siege and storming of the strong hill-fort of Gawilghur. The Second Anglo-Maratha War ended immediately afterward.

A strong detachment, consisting of the 78th along with a proportion of natives and artillery under the command of Adams, was sent to reduce the hill-fort of Lhoghur, whose governor proved hostile. Upon learning of preparations being made to storm the place, however, the governor became alarmed and surrendered. Wellesley once again thanked Adams, this time for the judiciousness of his preparations and his negotiations for the surrender, the fort being considered almost impregnable.

About the middle of 1804, the 78th went into cantonments at Bombay, where it remained until 1806, when it was sent to Goa. Adams was nominated to the command of the British auxiliary force at that Portuguese settlement under very delicate circumstances, during the French occupation of Portugal. At one time, the British force was ordered to be prepared to take possession of the colony if necessary.

In 1811, the 78th Regiment was ordered to Madras to augment the force which Sir Samuel Auchmuty, the Commander-in-Chief of the Madras Presidency, was about to lead to Java.

=== Java ===
Adams was appointed to the command of a brigade. The Java Expedition sailed the day before a tremendous hurricane which devastated the Coromandel coast. The expedition, which was well out to sea, suffered only trifling damage.

Reinforced at Malacca by a body of troops from Bengal, the army disembarked near Batavia, took possession of it, and made preparations to attack the strongly fortified position of Cornelis, within three or four miles of that city. After a heavy cannonade from both sides for some days, it was taken by assault, resulting, after some subsequent minor operations, in the final surrender of the island and its dependencies.

On the settlement of Java, Adams was appointed to the command of the central division of the army, and to the important office of minister at the court of the emperor at Solo. He held this office until it was merged in the appointment of a civil commissioner to superintend the affairs of the native courts. Adams was then nominated Resident at Surabaya, and to the command of the troops of the eastern division. The latter position, he continued to exercise at Surabaya and at Samarang, until the general peace and restitution of Java to the Dutch.

== Retirement ==
Having attained the rank of major-general, he returned to Europe and retired to his paternal estate near Pembroke. In 1830, he was promoted to lieutenant-general.

He died on 12 September 1835 in a shooting accident in the vicinity of Pembroke. While in the act of getting over a hedge, his fowling-piece, although at half-cock, went off; the contents entered his left eye and blew off the entire side of his head, killing him instantly.

He had married Frances-Louisa Holcombe, daughter of the Reverend William Holcombe, in 1801. She survived him.
