= Treaty of Surji-Anjangaon =

1803 treaty between Great Britain and Maratha

- Type: Peace treaty
- Context: Second Anglo-Maratha War
- Signed: 30 December 1803
- Location: Anjangaon, Maharashtra
- Condition: Cession by Daulat Rao Sindhia to the British East India Company of the Ganges–Yamuna Doab, Delhi, Agra, territories north of Jaipur and Jodhpur and the Gohad territory, parts of Bundelkhand, some districts of Gujarat, Broach, Ahmednagar Fort and its dependent territory, and territories south of the Ajanta range
- Amendment: November 1805; 5 November 1817
- Signatories: Daulat Rao Sindhia; British
- Parties: British East India Company; Maratha Confederacy

The Treaty of Surji-Anjangaon was signed on 30 December 1803 between the British and Daulat Rao Sindhia, chief of the Maratha Confederacy at Anjangaon town located in Maharashtra.

On 30 December 1803, the Sindhia signed the Treaty of Surji-Anjangaon with the British after the Battle of Assaye and Battle of Argaon. The agreement was the result of Major General Arthur Wellesley's military campaigns in Central India in the first phase of the Second Anglo-Maratha War (1803-1805). As a result of this treaty, Ganges-Jumna Doab, Haryana, the Delhi-Agra region, parts of Bundelkhand, Broach, some districts of Gujarat and fort of Ahmadnagar, eventually came under the control of the British East India Company.

The treaty was revised twice (once in November 1805 and again on 5 November 1817). The first revision mostly entailed restoring the territories of Gwalior and Gohad to Sindhia. The second revision of the treaty entailed granting Sindhia more power in return for providing help to the British in their fight against the Pindaris in the Third Anglo-Maratha War.

== See also ==
- List of treaties
