= John Orrok =

John Orrok (c. 1779 – 1838) was a junior British army officer in the late 18th century and early 19th century. The letters he wrote home to Scotland between 1801 and 1816 from England, India and what is now Belgium have been published and provide a detailed picture of his life and preoccupations and the society in which he moved.

== Biography ==
Born into Scottish gentry, John Orrok obtained a commission into the British army while in his early or mid-teens and served in India and Ceylon in the 1790s. On returning to Britain he married his cousin, Betsy Reid, in 1800 and in 1803 they left their baby daughter with Betsy's parents and both sailed to India. John joined first the 65th and then the 33rd Regiment which was led at the time by Arthur Wellesley, later the Duke of Wellington. Although John Orrok reached the rank of captain, he saw very little military action. The couple had three children while in India and after Betsy's death in 1810, Orrok brought them back to England, where he first served as a recruiting officer but then left the army and worked as a bookseller in London. His last known letters came from Brussels in 1816 and less is known of his later life. Orrok moved to Jamaica around 1836 with a second wife, Eliza, and six young children and was employed as the manager of the Jamaica Steam Navigation Company. He and Eliza both died in Jamaica in February 1838.

== The letters ==
John Orrok's letters show him to have been a devoted family man, and in addition to insights into his military life, there are detailed descriptions of the family's domestic and financial concerns. The published letters include three from Orrok's father William Orrok who was a lieutenant-colonel with the East India Company army and led a section of Wellington's army at the battle of Assaye in September 1803; unfortunately he had failed to follow instructions and his forces sustained very heavy losses. In India, John Orrok and Betsy were very friendly with their cousin, Mrs Freese, the wife of an EIC artillery officer who is believed to have been the mistress of Wellington while he was in the area.

Orrok's letters were saved by his eldest daughter, Anna, and found in her attic in Banff after her death in 1888.
