= Anthony Pohlmann =

Hanoverian soldier and mercenary

- Military career
- Branch: Hanoverian Army; Maratha Army; Madras Army
- Rank: Colonel
- Conflicts: Maratha–Rajput Wars; Second Anglo-Maratha War: Battle of Assaye

Anthony Pohlmann was a Hanoverian soldier and mercenary who served in the armies of Electorate of Hanover and Gwalior State.

== Life ==
Pohlmann arrived in India as a sergeant in a Hanoverian Army regiment sent to fight alongside the East India Company's Madras Army. He deserted his unit in 1792 or 1793 and took employment in the army of the Maratha prince Daulat Rao Sindhia.

He served under the French mercenary Benoît de Boigne, who promoted him to captain in 1794. By 1795, he was in command of a battalion of infantry, serving alongside the Anglo-Indian military adventurer James Skinner. In early 1799, Pierre Cuillier-Perron – who superseded de Boigne as the overall commander of Scindia's troops – promoted Pohlmann to colonel and gave him command of Scindia's second brigade. Pohlmann was instrumental at defeating the Rajput armies of Jodhpur and Jaipur at the Battle of Malpura. At the Battle of Assaye in 1803, Pohlmann effectively commanded all the regular battalions in the Maratha Army, after Scindia and the Rajah of Berar absented themselves before the battle. He re-entered service with the East India Company as a lieutenant colonel in 1804.

== Fiction ==
Anthony Pohlmann is a significant character in Bernard Cornwell's historical novels Sharpe's Triumph and Sharpe's Trafalgar.
