= Battle of Laswari =

1803 battle of the Second Anglo-Maratha War

Coordinates: 27.5500°N 76.9333°E

- Part of the Second Anglo-Maratha War
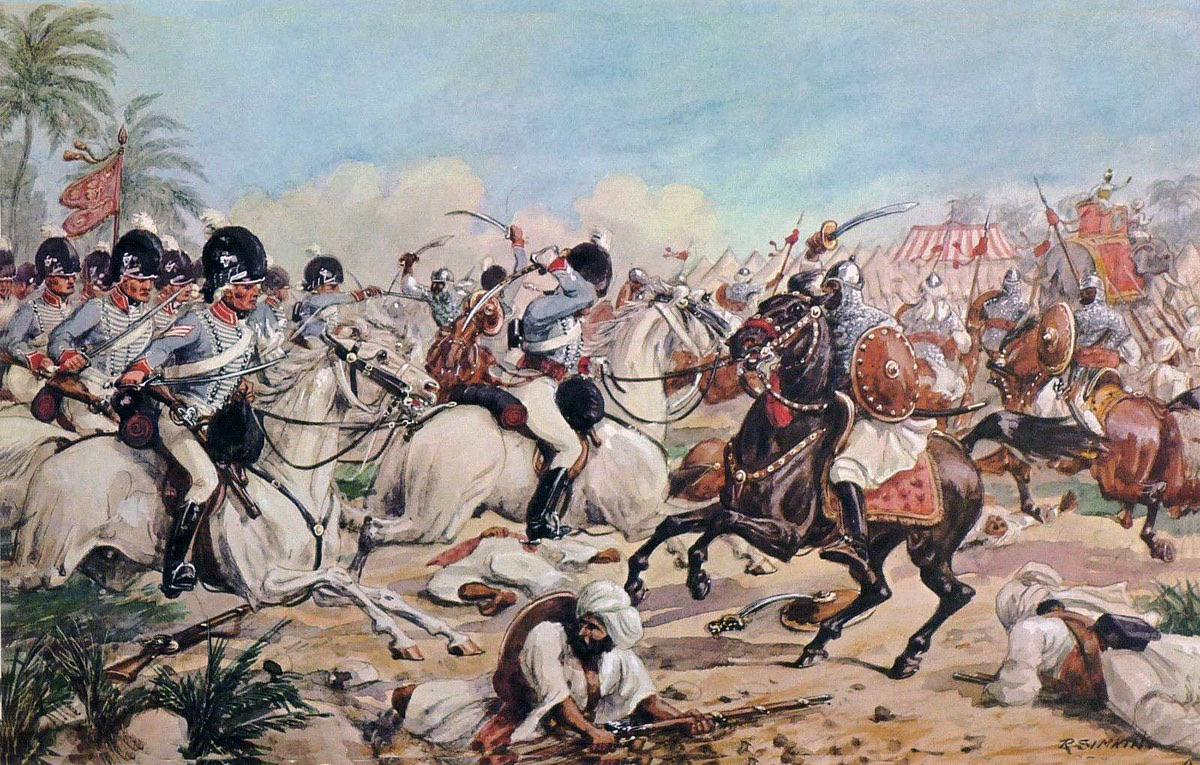
- 1926 illustration of the battle
Date	1 November 1803
Location	Near Alwar, Rajasthan
Result	British victory

Belligerents
United Kingdom; East India Company	Maratha Empire

Commanders and leaders
Gerard Lake	Ambaji Ingle; Raghoji II of Nagpur; Daulat Rao Sindhia

Strength
10,000 infantry and cavalry	9,000 infantry; 5,000 cavalry

Casualties and losses
800+ killed or wounded	~1,000 killed

The Battle of Laswari took place on 1 November 1803 near Laswari village, Alwar. It was part of the Second Anglo-Maratha War. The British under Gerard Lake were anxious to finish the war by neutralizing the last substantial force that the Maratha confederacy possessed, consisting of 12 battalions of regular infantry trained by the adventurer Chevalier Dudrenec. Dudrenec deserted the Marathas and command fell onto Ambaji Ingle, a veteran Maratha officer.

Lake decided to dispense first with his artillery and later with his infantry in a series of forced marches to catch up with the Maratha force. Lake initially encountered the enemy force with just three brigades of cavalry, but the British troopers by repeated charges were able to contain the Maratha Army until the British infantry arrived. The British units, commanded by Lake, were about 10,000 men strong, opposing Sindhia's force of 9,000 veteran infantry and 5,000 cavalry under the command of Ambaji Ingle. The British units were also supported by additional allied troops from Alwar.

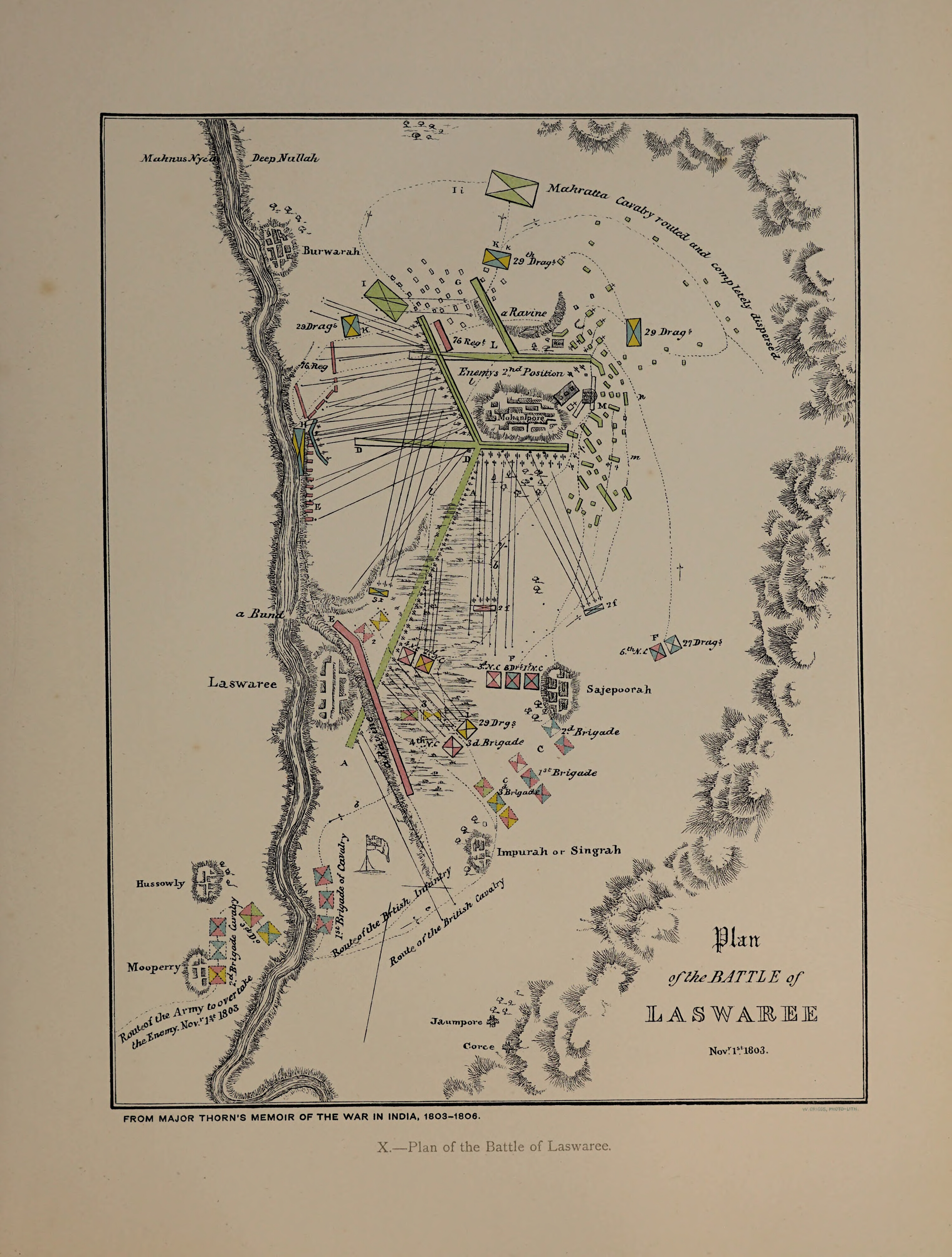
Plan of the battle

The Maratha infantry made a most gallant defence, standing their ground until the survivors laid down their arms. The cavalry also suffered heavily. The British captured 71 guns and a large quantity of ammunition and stores. Lake later wrote, "I never was in so severe a business in my life or anything like it… these fellows fought like devils, or rather like heroes". "The casualties on both sides were very heavy. The Company lost many officers, including Maj. Gen. Weir, Col. Vandeleur and Maj. Griffith. Lake's son was also killed." On 17 December 1803, Raghuji Bhonsale (II) of Nagpur signed the Treaty of Deogaon with the British after the Battle of Laswari and gave up the province of Cuttack including Balasore.

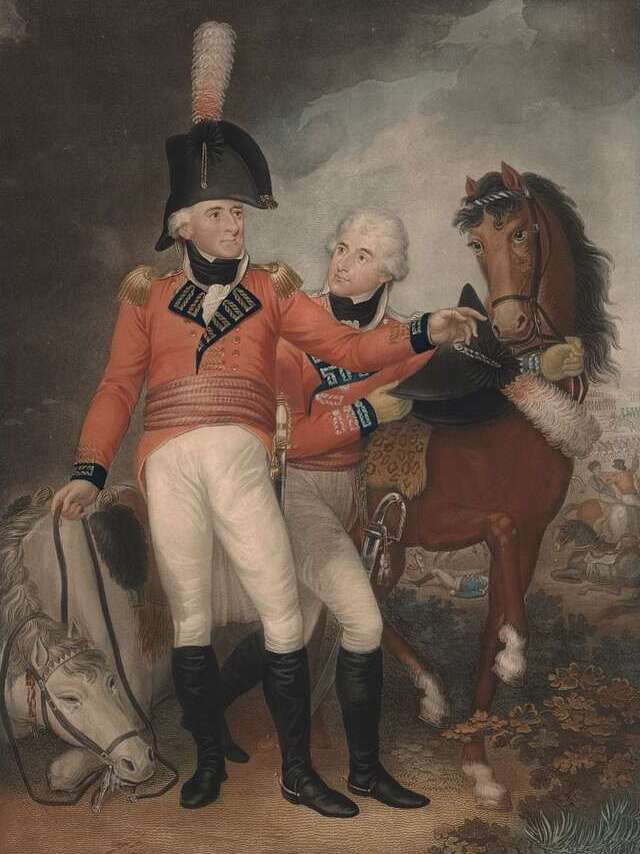
1807 engraving of Lake and his son at the battle
