= Assaye =

Village in Maharashtra

- Village
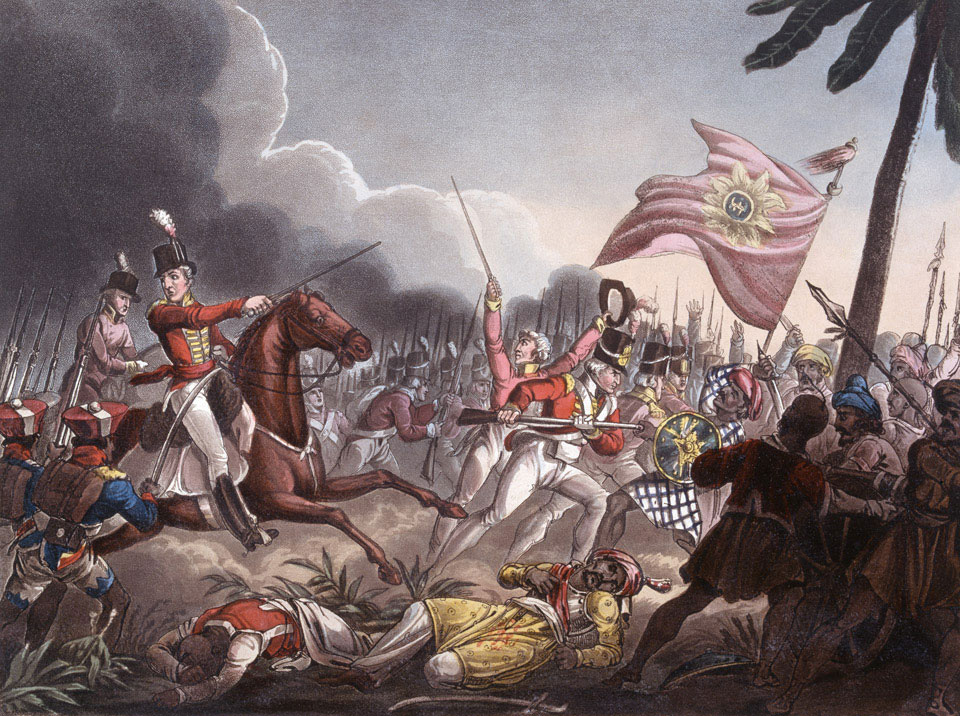
- Battle of Assaye

- Location within Maharashtra Location within India
- Coordinates: 20.245126°N 75.887396°E
- Country: India
- State: Maharashtra
- District: Jalna

Government
  - Type: Panchayati raj (India)
  - Body: Gram panchayat

Languages
  - Official: Marathi
- Time zone: UTC+5:30 (IST)
- Postal code: 411030
- Vehicle registration: MH 21

Assaye is a small village in the Jalna district of the state of Maharashtra in western India. The village was the location of the Battle of Assaye in 1803, fought between the Maratha Empire and the British East India Company.

It became the first victory for the young general Arthur Wellesley (later Duke of Wellington). Here he commanded an outnumbered combined force of British and Sepoy regiments against a mixed modernised and tribal Maratha army. He always described this as his greatest military victory.
