= Second Anglo-Maratha War =

Conflict within the Maratha Confederacy involving the British East India Company

- Part of the Anglo-Maratha Wars
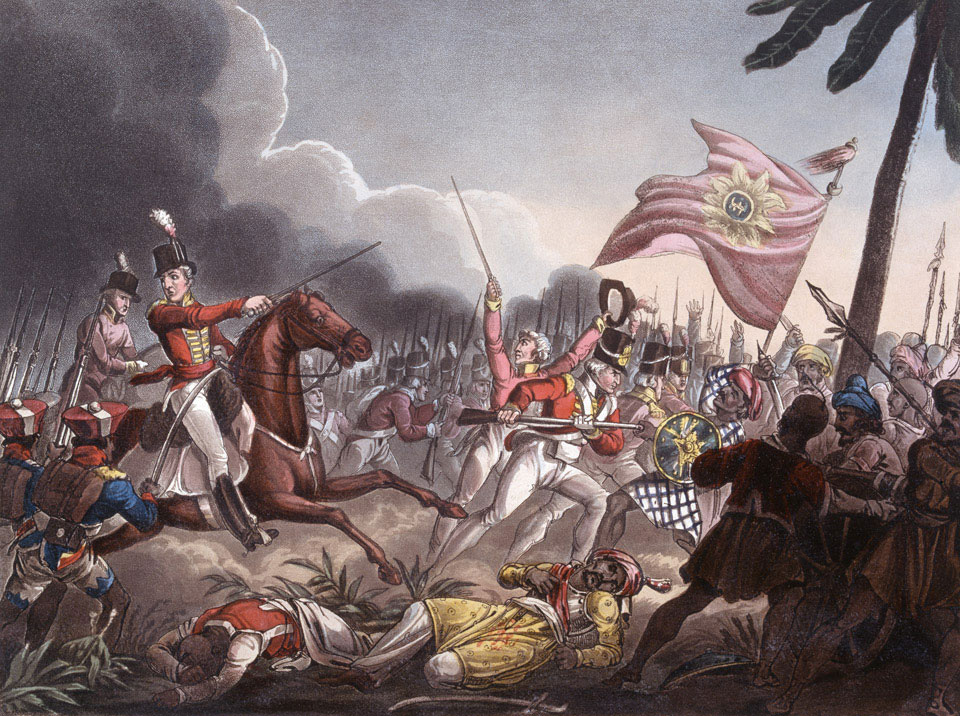
- Aquatint engraving of the Battle of Assaye
Date	8 August 1803 – 24 December 1805 (2 years, 5 months, 2 weeks, and 2 days)
Location	India
Result	British-Peshwa victory

Belligerents
British Empire: East India Company; Peshwas; Baroda State; Hyderabad; Mughal Empire; Kota State	Maratha Empire: Gwalior State; Kingdom of Nagpur; Indore State; Bharatpur State; Supported by: (French First Republic) France

Commanders and leaders
(United Kingdom of Great Britain and Ireland) Gerard Lake; (United Kingdom of Great Britain and Ireland) Arthur Wellesley; (United Kingdom of Great Britain and Ireland) William Monson; (United Kingdom of Great Britain and Ireland) John Fraser †; (East India Company) Richard Wellesley; (East India Company) James Stevenson; (East India Company) James Skinner; (East India Company) David Ochterlony; (Maratha Empire) Bajirao II; (Maratha Empire) Anand Gaekwad; Nizam Ali Khan; Shah Alam II; Amar Sing †; Afsal Khan †; Akbayram Pachali (POW); Fais Khan (POW)	(Maratha Empire) Ambaji Ingle; Daulat Rao Sindhia; Pierre Perron; Anthony Pohlmann; Louis Bourquin; Sardar Wable; Beni Rajput †; Raghoji II; Sardar Rajput; Shiv Rana; Manoo Bapu †; Jaswantro Holkar; Wahid Ali Khan; Bakshi Shankar; Ranjit Singh

Units involved
94th Regiment of Foot; 78th Regiment of Foot; 76th Regiment of Foot; 74th Regiment of Foot; 33rd Regiment of Foot; Madras Sappers; 81st Pioneers; 19th Light Dragoons; 8th Irish Hussars; Devonshire Regiment	Maratha Army

Strength
53,000 men At least 39 guns	80,800–90,800 men (Note: 10,800 European trained Indian infantry, 10,000–20,000 irregular infantry, and 60,000 irregular cavalry.); 160 guns

Casualties and losses
Unknown	Unknown

Second Anglo-Maratha War (from 1803 –1805) was a large conflict within the Maratha Empire involving the East India Company. It resulted in a major loss of territory for the Marathas, including regions around Delhi and in present-day Gujarat falling into direct Company rule.

== Background ==
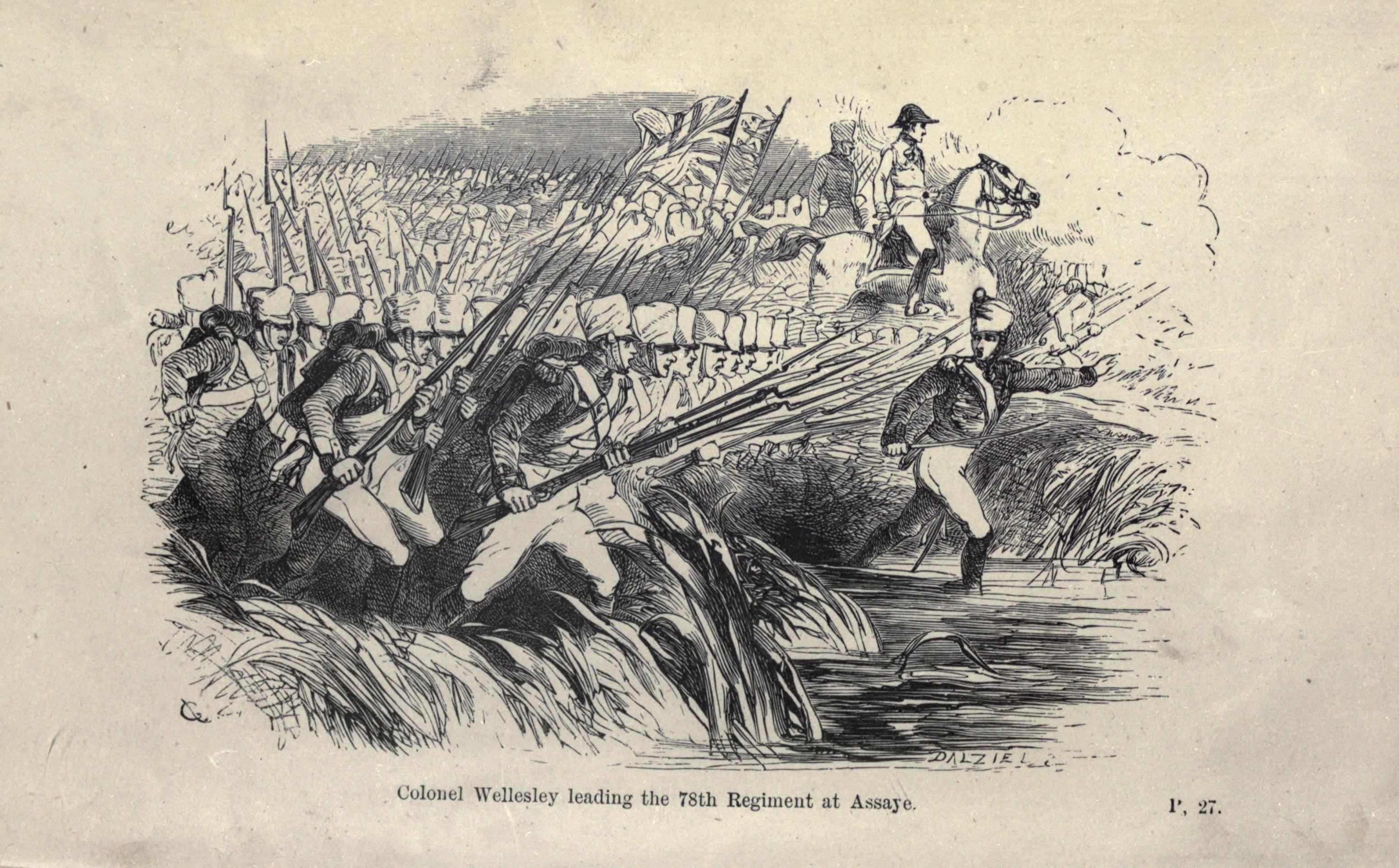
The 78th Regiment of Foot at the Battle of Assaye

The British had supported the Peshwa Raghunathrao in the First Anglo-Maratha War, and they continued with his son, Baji Rao II. Though not as martial in his courage as his father, the son was "a past master in deceit and intrigue". Coupled with his "cruel streak", Baji Rao II soon provoked the enmity of Yashwant Rao Holkar when he had one of Holkar's relatives killed.

The Maratha Empire at that time consisted of a confederacy of five major chiefs: the Peshwa (Prime Minister) at the capital city of Poona, the Gaekwad chief of Baroda, the Scindia chief of Gwalior, the Holkar chief of Indore, and the Bhonsle chief of Nagpur. The Maratha chiefs were engaged in internal quarrels among themselves. Lord Mornington, the Governor-General of British India had repeatedly offered a subsidiary treaty to the Peshwa and Scindia, but Nana Fadnavis refused strongly.

In October 1802, the combined armies of Peshwa Baji Rao II and Scindia were defeated by Yashwantrao Holkar, ruler of Indore, at the Battle of Poona. Baji Rao II fled to British protection, and in December the same year concluded the Treaty of Bassein with the British East India Company, ceding territory for the maintenance of a subsidiary force and agreeing to treaty with no other power. The treaty would become the "death knell of the Maratha Empire".

== War ==
This act on the part of the Peshwa, their nominal overlord, horrified and disgusted the Maratha chieftains; in particular, the Scindia rulers of Gwalior and the Bhonsale rulers of Nagpur and Berar contested the agreement.

The British strategy included Maj. Gen. Arthur Wellesley securing the Deccan Plateau, Lt. Gen. Gerard Lake taking Doab and then Delhi, Powell entering Bundelkhand, Murray taking Badoch, and Harcourt neutralizing Bihar. The British had available over 53,000 men to help accomplish their goals.

With the logistic assembly of his army complete (24,000 men in total) Wellesley gave the order to break camp and attack the nearest Maratha fort on 8 August 1803. On the same day he took the walled Pettah of Ahmednagar (town adjacent to the fort) by escalade.

The Ahmednagar Fort surrendered on 12 August after an infantry attack had exploited an artillery-made breach in the wall. With the pettah and fort now in British control Wellesley was able to extend control southwards to the river Godavari.

In September 1803, Scindia forces lost to Lake at Delhi and to Wellesley at Assaye. On 18 October, British forces took the pettah of Asirgarh Fort with a loss of two killed and five wounded. The fort's garrison subsequently surrendered on the 21st after the attackers had erected a battery. British artillery pounded ancient ruins used by Scindia forces as forward operating bases, eroding their control. In November, Lake defeated another Scindia force at Laswari, followed by Wellesley's victory over Bhonsle forces at Argaon (now Adgaon) on 29 November 1803.

== Conclusion ==
On 17 December 1803, Raghoji II Bhonsale of Nagpur signed the Treaty of Deogaon in Odisha with the British after the Battle of Argaon and gave up the province of Cuttack (which included Mughal and the coastal part of Odisha, Garjat/the princely states of Odisha, Balasore Port, parts of Midnapore district of West Bengal).

On 30 December 1803, the Daulat Scindia signed the Treaty of Surji-Anjangaon with the British after the Battle of Assaye and Battle of Laswari and ceded to the British, Hisar, Panipat, Rohtak, Rewari, Gurgaon, Ganges-Jamuna Doab, the Delhi-Agra region, parts of Bundelkhand, Broach, some districts of Gujarat and the fort of Ahmadnagar.

The British started hostilities against Yashwantrao Holkar on 6 April 1804. Yashwantrao was somewhat successful as he harassed the British forces by guerilla warfare. However, he didn't receive the expected help from Scindia who had already signed a treaty with the British. He went to Punjab and sought Ranjit Singh's help with no success. The lack of resources compelled him to come to terms with British.

The Treaty of Rajghat, signed on 24 December 1805, forced Holkar to give up Tonk, Rampura, and Bundi to the British.

== See also ==
- Ahmednagar Fort
- Alexander Adams
- List of Maratha dynasties and states
- Pettah of Ahmednagar
- Third Anglo-Maratha War

Preceded by First Anglo-Maratha War	Anglo-Maratha Wars	Succeeded by Third Anglo-Maratha War
Preceded by Fourth Anglo-Mysore War	Indo-British conflicts	Succeeded by Third Anglo-Maratha War
