= Battle of Argaon =

1803 battle

Battle of Argaon (Sirsoli)
- Part of the Second Anglo-Maratha War
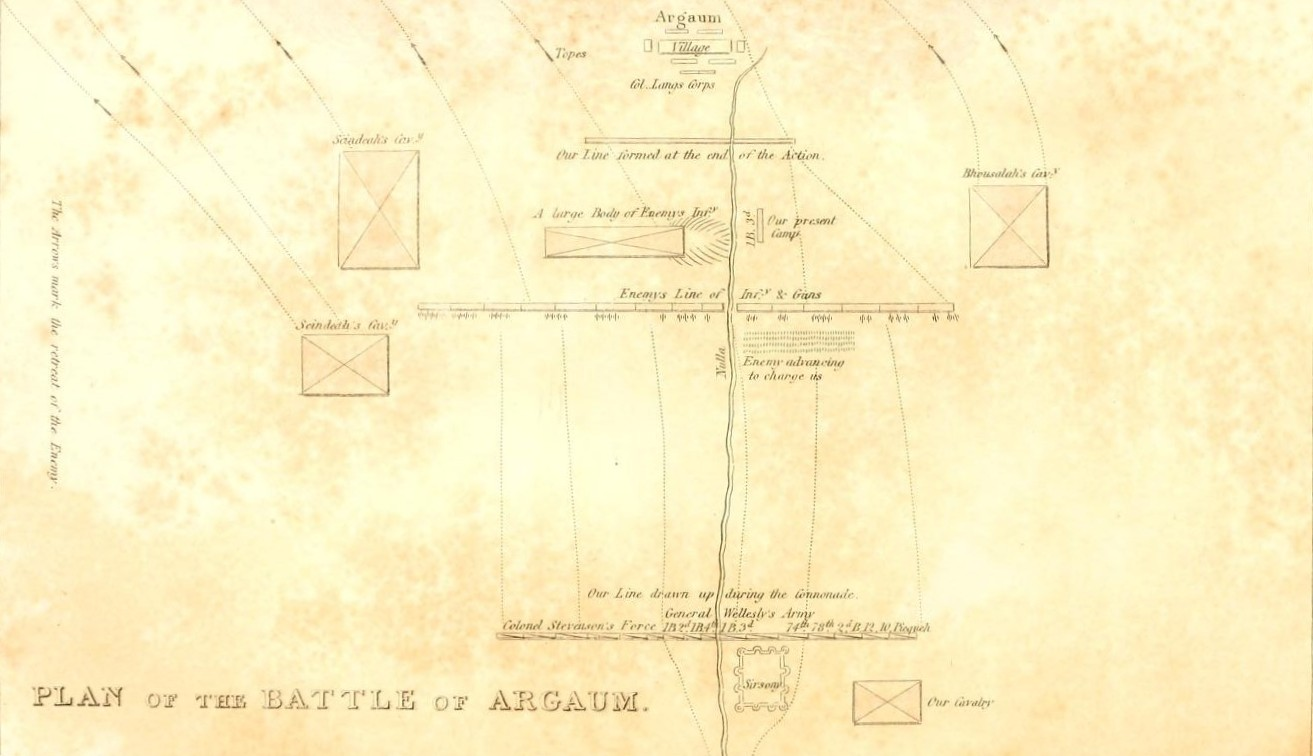
- Plan of the Battle of Argaon (Sirsoli)
Date	29 November 1803
Location	Sirsoli Adgaon, Akola District, India 21°04′49″N 76°56′37″E
Result	British victory
Territorial changes	Berar annexed to the Nizam's dominions

Belligerents
British Empire: East India Company; Hyderabad	Maratha Empire: Gwalior State; Kingdom of Nagpur

Commanders and leaders
(United Kingdom of Great Britain and Ireland) Arthur Wellesley (East India Company) James Stevenson; Nizam Ali Khan	Raghuji II; Daulat Sindhia

Strength
8,000 men	10,000 men 41 guns

Casualties and losses
650 killed 350 wounded 25 missing	900 killed 1,100 wounded 22 guns

The Battle of Argaon (also known as Battle of Argaum) took place on 29 November 1803, between the British under the command of Major-General Arthur Wellesley (later the Duke of Wellington) and the forces of the Bhonsles of Berar and the Scindias of Gwalior.

== Prelude ==
After Raghoji II of Nagpur and Daulat Rao Sindhia were defeated at the Battle of Laswari, they moved south on 28 November 1803. In 1803, Nizam Ali Khan, Asaf Jah II fell gravely ill, prompting Daulat Rao Shinde and the Bhonsale to invade his territories.

== Battle ==
British forces, under the command of Colonel James Stevenson and Arthur Wellesley, defeated the Marathas at the Battle of Adgaon. This victory allowed the Nizam to regain control of all Maratha claims in Berar, thereby putting an end to the Bhonsale's rule over the region. Nizam Ali Khan died later that same year, and he was succeeded by his son Sikander Jah, also known as Asaf Jah III.

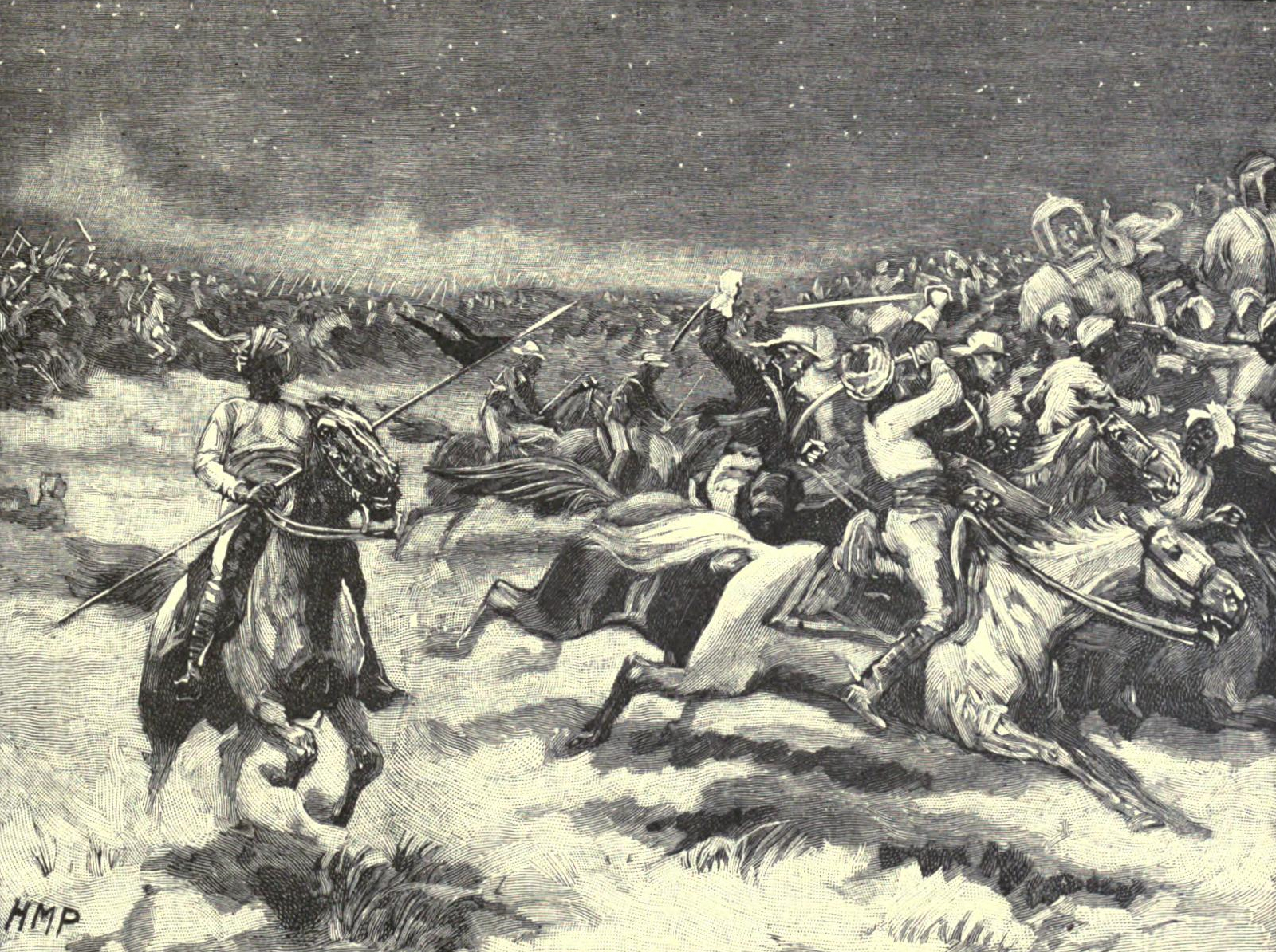
The Chase at Argaum

== See also ==
- Second Anglo-Maratha War
