= James Stevenson (East India Company officer) =

Cavalry officer (died 1805)

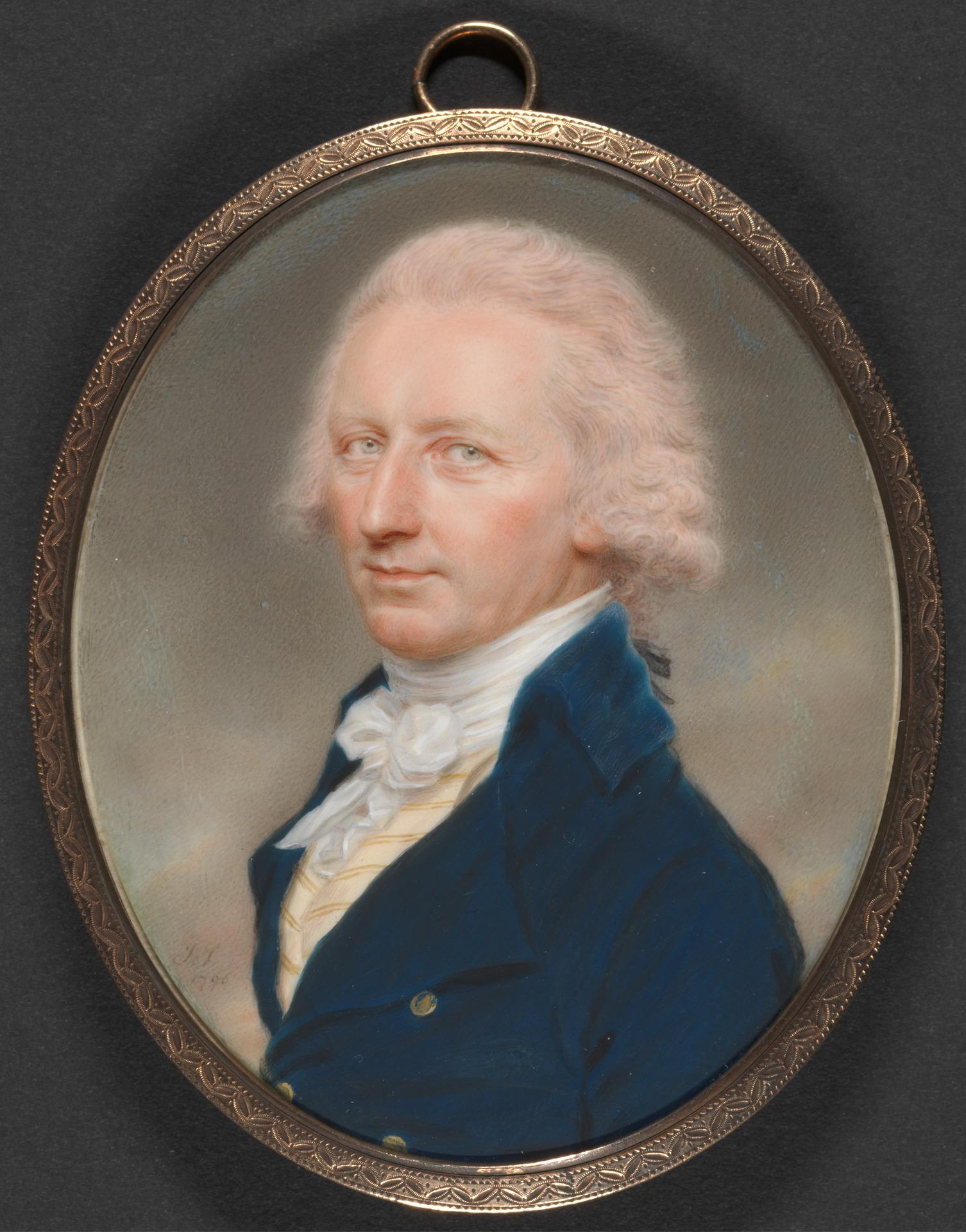
General Stevenson, miniature by John Smart, 1796.

Major General James Desart Stevenson (died 1805) was a British East India Company cavalry officer who saw extensive service throughout the Indian subcontinent. He commanded a cavalry squadron at the battles of Seringapatam and Mallavelly, and in late 1800 he was temporarily appointed as district governor of Mysore. He took part in the Second Anglo-Maratha War in which he served as Major General Arthur Wellesley's senior subordinate and led the successful assaults on the Maratha strongholds at Jalna, Burhanpur and Asirgarh. Stevenson was promoted to major general in January 1805, but he died while aboard a ship returning to England later that year.
