= Military career of Arthur Wellesley, 1st Duke of Wellington =

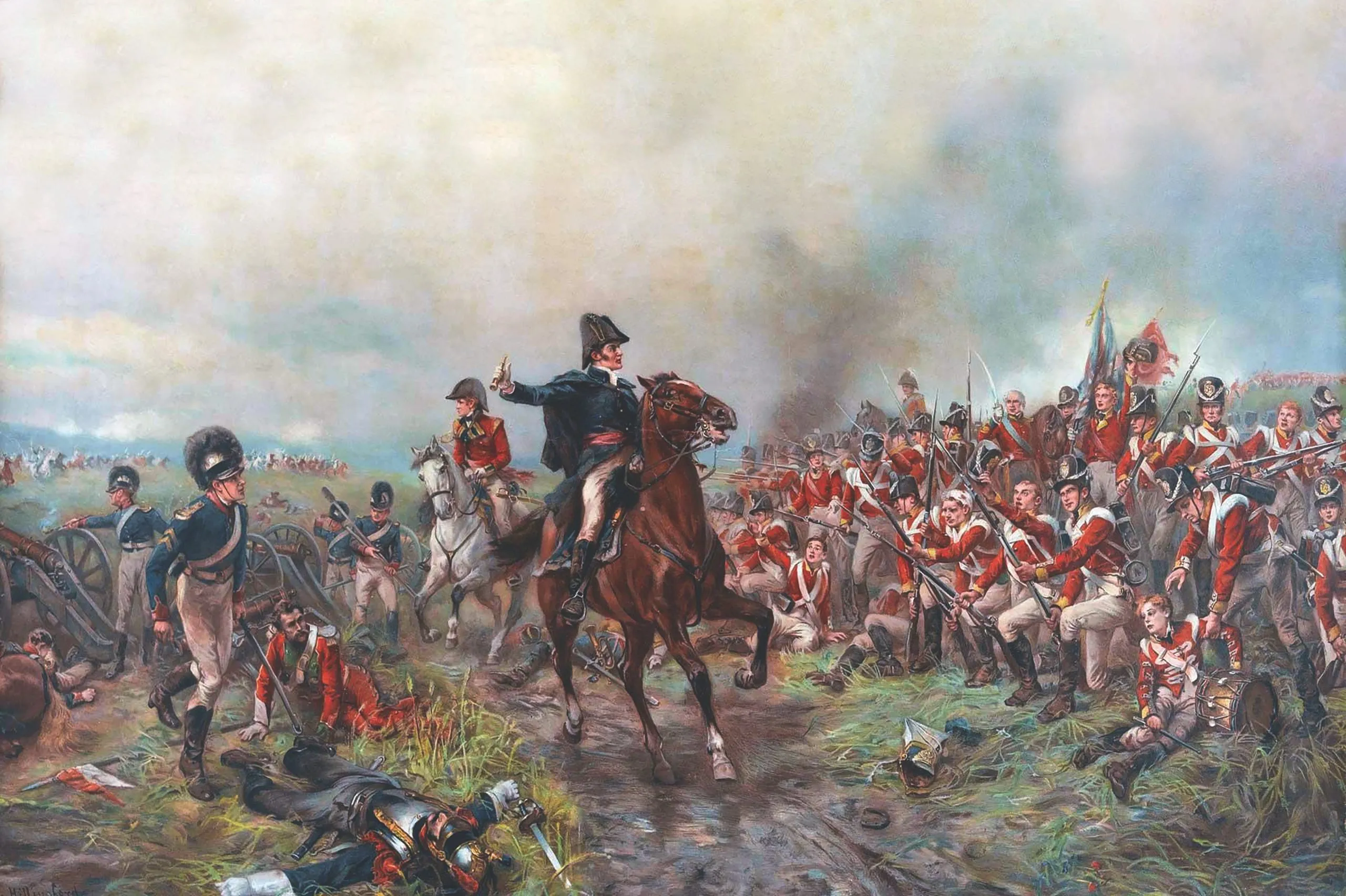
Wellington at Waterloo by Robert Alexander Hillingford

Arthur Wellesley, 1st Duke of Wellington, KG, GCB, GCH, PC, FRS (1 May 1769 – 14 September 1852), was one of the leading British military and political figures of the 19th century. Often referred to solely as "The Duke of Wellington", he led a successful military career in the Indian subcontinent during the Fourth Anglo-Mysore War (1798–99) and the Second Anglo-Maratha War (1803–1805), and in Europe during the Napoleonic Wars (1803–1815).

Starting his career in 1787 as a commissioned officer in the infantry, before seeing his first action in the Flanders campaign, Wellesley rose in rank by purchasing his first four commissions, as was common practice in the British Army for wealthy officers. His continued rise in status and fame thereafter came about as the result of his tactical ability and successes as an army commander. Between 1794 and 1815, Wellesley participated in a number of military campaigns where he achieved tactical, strategic, and decisive victories in India and across Europe.

Wellesley faced and defeated many of Napoleon's marshals as the commander in chief of the Anglo-Portuguese Army during the Peninsular War, but his best known battle was at Waterloo in 1815 where he led an Anglo-Allied force to a decisive victory over Napoleon. It was to be the last battle for both commanders, and brought the Napoleonic Wars to a close. In old age he was celebrated as an outstanding public servant—"the Great Duke." Posthumous reappraisal proved harsher, depicting him as an overcautious general. Today he is widely recognized for his military genius and for his character as a principled, public-spirited statesman.

== Military career ==
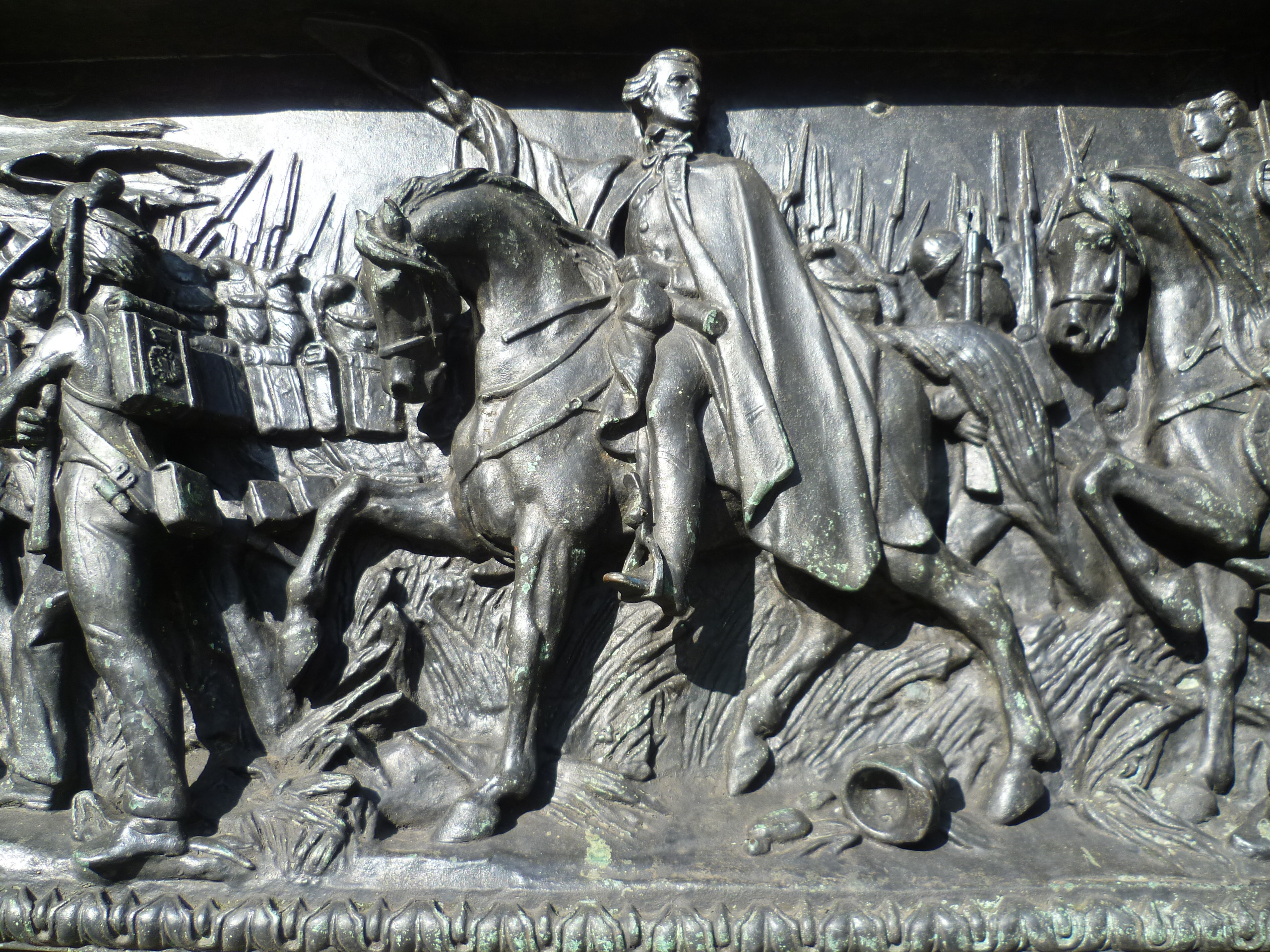
Detail of a bronze relief panel, depicting the Battle of Waterloo, beneath Carlo Marochetti's Equestrian statue of the Duke of Wellington, Glasgow

There is speculation by historians and biographers about how many battles Wellington actually participated in during his career. Military historian Ian Fletcher identifies twenty-four major battles and sieges involving the British Army between 1808 and 1815 with Wellington in command of seventeen. Military historian Mark Adkin commented that "Wellington had fought in some twenty-four battles and sieges prior to Waterloo". Although this is easily contested, the precise number of battles may never be known. It can be established from records, dispatches and reports dating back to the events that he was present in at least fifty separate military actions, including an assortment of meeting engagements, pitched battles, sieges, skirmishes and minor engagements, throughout his career. He also ordered countless other remote engagements mostly whilst serving in the Napoleonic Wars, during which Britain played a major role in the Coalition's struggle against Napoleon, between 1805 and 1815.

=== Commissions and promotions ===
Wellesley received his first commission by purchase. He was gazetted ensign on 7 March 1787, in the 73rd (Highland) Regiment of Foot, and became an aide-de-camp in October. He purchased his commission to lieutenant on 25 December 1787, in the 76th Regiment. As a junior officer he transferred to the 41st Regiment soon after to avoid duty in the East Indies, and in June 1789 transferred again, to the 12th (Prince of Wales's) Light Dragoons. He obtained his commission as captain on 30 June 1791, in the 58th (Rutlandshire) Regiment, having served the regulation minimum of three years, and again to major on 30 April 1793, in the 33rd (First Yorkshire West Riding) Regiment, having served six years. He purchased his final commission to lieutenant-colonel on 30 September 1793, at the age of 24. From there on further promotion could only be attained through seniority, per Army Regulations.

In September 1794, Wellesley experienced his first taste of warfare, against the French at the Battle of Boxtel with the 33rd. His promotion to colonel, on 3 May 1796, came by seniority, and in June he was sent with the 33rd to India. In 1799 he fought in the Fourth Anglo-Mysore War, commanding three victorious actions with the East India Company army.

In 1800, whilst serving as Governor of Mysore, Wellesley was tasked with suppressing an insurgency led by Dhoondiah Waugh, a former Mysorean soldier who had served under Tipu Sultan. After the fall of Seringapatam, Waugh had turned to brigandage, having raised a sizeable force composed of disbanded Mysorean soldiers, and raided villages along the Maratha–Mysore border. Waugh had also captured some British-held outposts and forts in Mysore, and was receiving the support of several Maratha killedars opposed to Company rule in India. This drew the attention of the East India Company, and Wellesley was given independent command of a combined British Army and East India Company force. In June 1800, with an army of 8,000 infantry and cavalry, Wellesley moved against Waugh, having learned that Waugh's forces numbered over 50,000, although the majority (around 30,000) were irregular light cavalry and unlikely to pose a serious threat. Throughout June–August 1800, Wellesley advanced through Waugh's territory, his troops escalading forts in turn and capturing each one with "trifling loss". Waugh continued to retreat, but his forces were rapidly deserting, he had no infantry and due to the monsoon weather flooding river crossings he could no longer outpace the British advance. On 10 September, at the Battle of Conagul, Wellesley personally led a charge of 1,400 British dragoons and sepoy cavalry, in single line with no reserve, against Dhoondiah and his remaining 5,000 cavalry. Dhoondiah was killed in action during the charge, and his body was discovered and taken to the British camp tied to a cannon. With this victory Wellesley's campaign was concluded, as British authority had been restored.

After winning the Fourth Anglo-Mysore War, and serving as governor of Seringapatam and Mysore, Wellesley was promoted to major-general on 29 April 1802, although he did not receive the news until September. Whilst in India he wrote of his regiment "I have commanded them for nearly ten years during which I have scarcely been away from them and I have always found them to be the quietest and best behaved body of men in the army."

Wellesley gained further success in India during the Second Anglo-Maratha War of 1803–05, winning the battles of Assaye and Argaon and in 1806 Wellesley succeeded Charles Cornwallis, 1st Marquess Cornwallis as Colonel of the 33rd, which he held until 1813. By 1807, Napoleon's attempt to prevent continental Europe from trading with Britain had resulted in all but Sweden, Denmark-Norway and Portugal closing their ports. In June 1807, Napoleon pressured Denmark further, resulting in the British naval bombardment of Copenhagen and seizure of the Danish fleet to prevent it from falling into French hands. Wellesley's brief role against Danish land forces at the Battle of Køge helped secure Denmark. Wellesley later disapproved of the bombardment, saying "we might have taken the capital with greater ease."

He was promoted to lieutenant-general on 25 April 1808, and in June was given command of 9,000 men set to invade Spanish America. But in 1807, Napoleon had invaded Portugal, via Spain, intent on preventing its continued trade with Britain and subsequently replaced the Spanish royal family with his own brother, Joseph Bonaparte, in May 1808. In Madrid, the people attempted a rebellion against the French occupation which spread across Spain resulting in mass executions in reprisal, leading both the Portuguese and Spanish juntas (local administrations) to call on British support.

On 31 July 1811, Wellesley was promoted to general, although it only applied in the Peninsula. His final promotion to field marshal came on 21 June 1813, following his success at the Battle of Vitoria which had broken the remaining French hold in Spain. Wellington was awarded with a baton – partially designed by the Prince Regent himself – the first of its kind in the British Army.

=== Allied commander ===
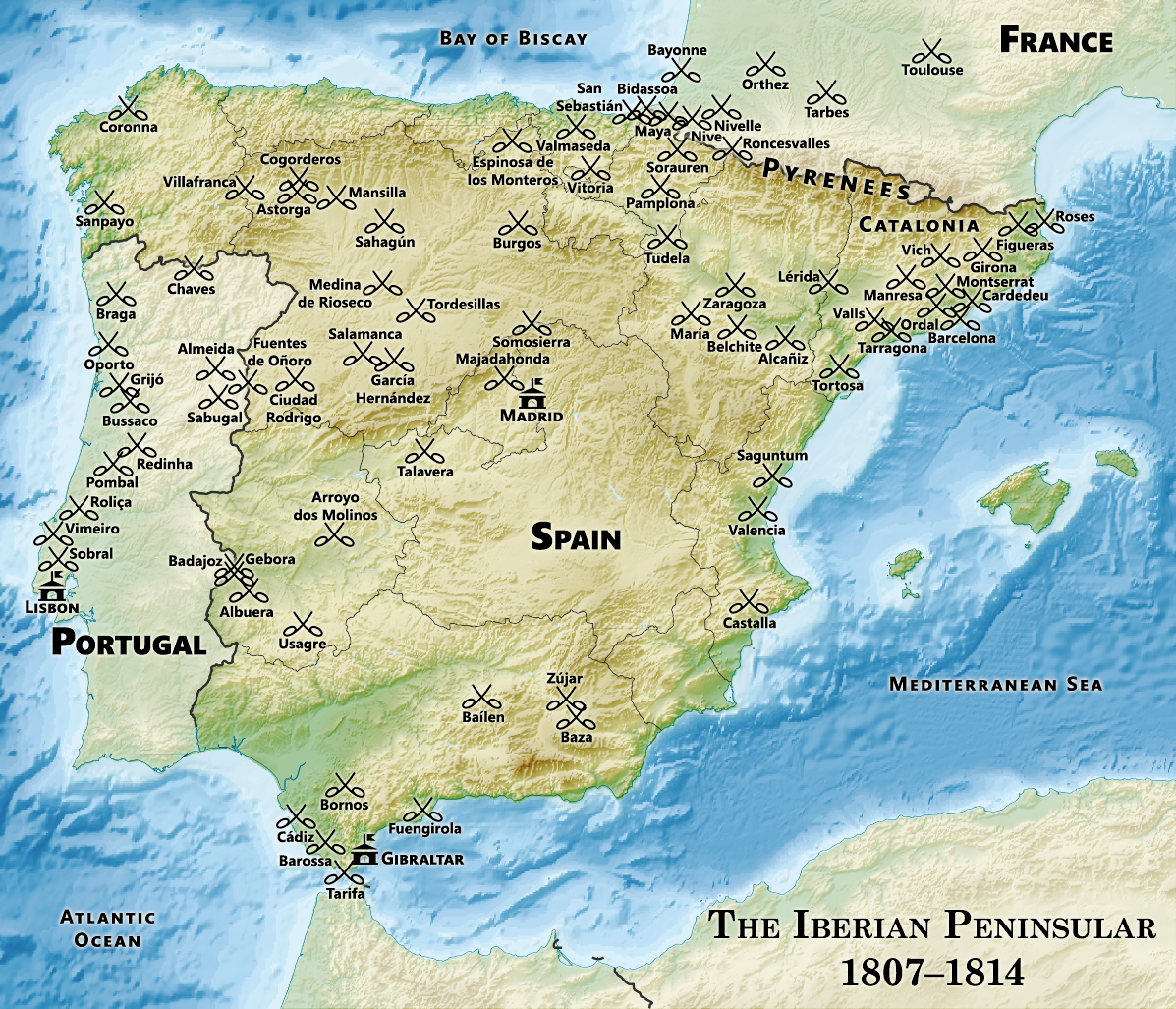
Map of Peninsular War battles, 1807–14

In August 1808, Wellesley entered the Peninsular War, landing at Mondego Bay, north of Lisbon, with 13,000–15,000 men. Just three weeks after landing, Wellesley defeated the French at the Battle of Vimeiro. Aware of his weak position, French général de division (divisional general) Jean-Andoche Junot called for an armistice and negotiations began which lead to the Convention of Cintra and his army's withdrawal from Portugal.

Wellesley returned to England, arriving on 4 October, but his victory at Vimeiro was overshadowed because of the controversial terms of the Convention of Cintra, a treaty that he had signed which arranged for French troops to be evacuated back to France on Royal Navy vessels, rather than kept as prisoners, along with all their equipment, weapons and personal possessions, which included anything they might have plundered from Portugal since its occupation in 1807. The convention was subject to ridicule by the newspapers, as were the three officers who had signed it, namely Wellesley and two superior generals: Sir Harry Burrard and Sir Hew Dalrymple. A public inquiry was held in November to determine their roles in the convention. Wellesley gave evidence stating that he and Burrard had played no part in negotiating terms with the French generals, that Dalrymple had discussed the contents of the treaty alone. He had approved of a French evacuation but felt the terms were too generous; though he considered the treaty "an extraordinary paper" his signature was a formality. A Board of General Officers voted 4:3 in favour of the convention and concluded proceedings on 22 December. Furthermore, they commended Wellesley's role at Vimeiro and he later received the thanks of Parliament for his victory.

When the head of the British forces in the Peninsula, Sir John Moore, was killed in the Battle of Corunna in January 1809, the British Army having been driven from the Peninsula in disarray, Wellesley sent the Secretary of State for War a memo insisting that a force of no less than 30,000 British troops should be sent to defend and rebuild Portugal's military strength. His proposal was approved and he re-embarked to Lisbon on 14 April 1809, having been appointed to head of all British forces in Portugal on 6 April – a motion supported by the government and King George III, as Wellesley did not hold seniority.

Due to a second invasion of Portugal by the French he remained to continue the Peninsular War for a further five years, engaging the French armies across Portugal, Spain, and north into France until Napoleon's abdication in 1814.

After the Battle of Talavera, in July 1809, Wellesley was made a peer and bestowed the titles baron and viscount. As he was unavailable, his elder brother William was consulted by the College of Heralds to decide on a suitable name for the title. William chose "Wellington", Viscount Wellington of Talavera, which became Wellesley's new name, one that he said was "exactly right". On 26 August 1809, The London Gazette reported: "The King has been pleased to grant the Dignities of Baron and Viscount of the United Kingdoms of Great Britain and Ireland unto the Right Honourable Sir Arthur Wellesley, Knight of the Most Honourable Order of the Bath, and Lieutenant-General of His Majesty's Forces, and to the Heirs Male of his Body lawfully begotten, by the Names, Styles, and Titles of Baron Douro of Wellesley, in the County of Somerset, and Viscount Wellington of Talavera, and of Wellington, in the said County."

He returned to Europe in 1815 appointed overall commander of the Anglo-Allied forces of the Seventh Coalition, better known as the Hundred Days, following Napoleon's escape from exile and attempt to retain power.

Despite many battles to his name over twenty-one years of duty, it would be shortly after the battle at Waterloo upon hearing of approximately 50,000 casualties dead or dying that he wept, saying "I hope to God I have fought my last battle." It had been a close victory at such great cost that it broke his fighting spirit, and marked the end of his long service overseas with a notable military career. He returned to British politics and became a leading statesman. He was appointed Master-General of the Ordnance (1819–27) and Commander-in-Chief of the Forces (1827–28/1842–52), but Wellington did not fight again.

== Generalship ==
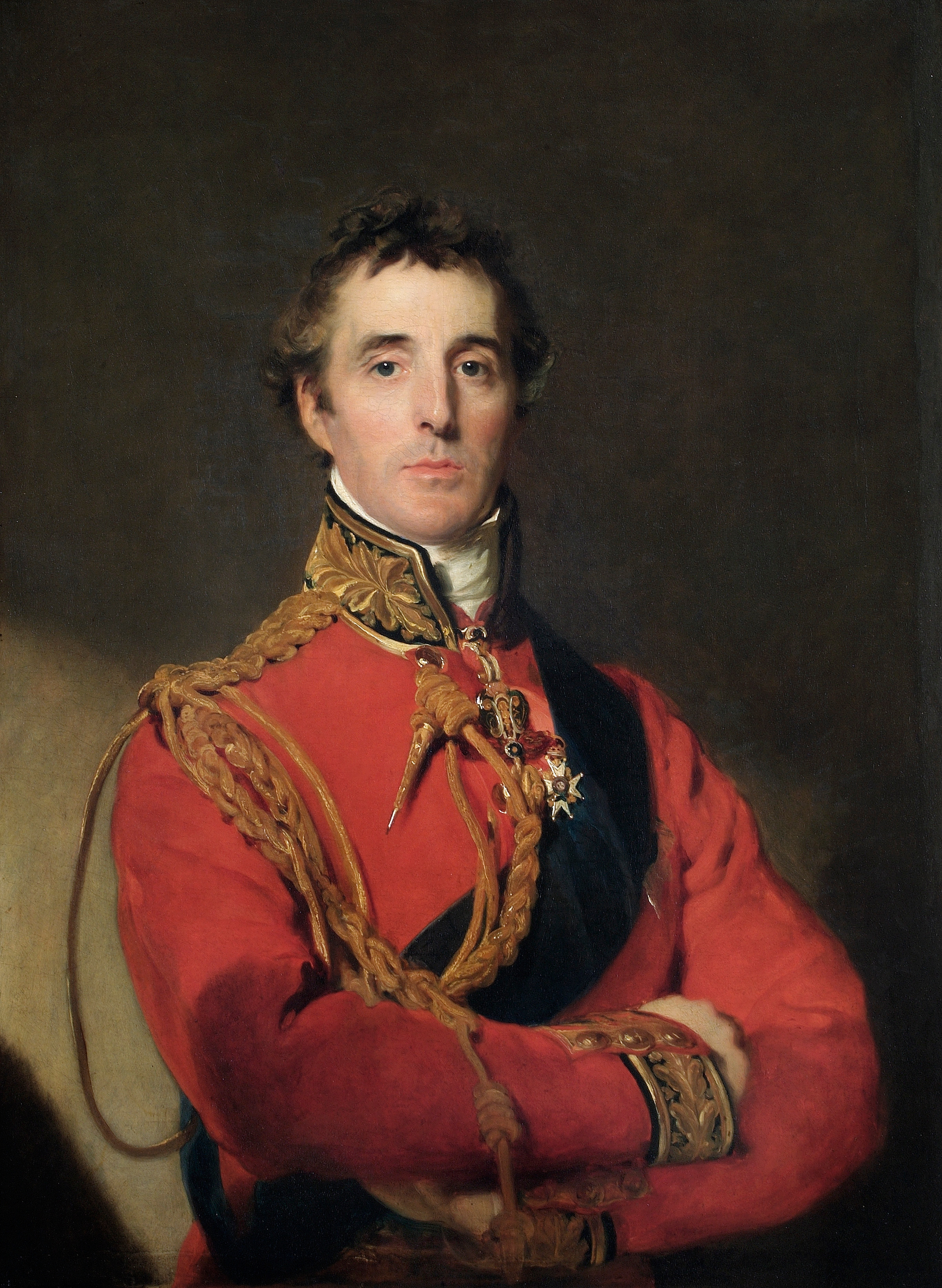
Arthur Wellesley, 1st Duke of Wellington by Sir Thomas Lawrence, 1815

Wellesley's understanding of logistics was to prove valuable in leading an expeditionary force against the French invasion of Portugal and Spain. He was adept at planning long marches through unknown territory, understanding that he not only had thousands of men to manage efficiently, but that a huge amount of supplies were required to adequately feed and sustain his army. Secure supply lines to the Portuguese coast were of vital importance if he was to maintain his ability to fight the French.

In April 1809, Wellesley returned to Portugal with 28,000 British and 16,000 Portuguese troops under his command – the French Army of Spain numbered 360,000. Despite many French troops having been dispersed to garrisons across Spain or located to protect supply and communication lines, even with the Portuguese Army and militia, and remnants of the Spanish Army and guerrillas to support him, Wellington faced overwhelming odds. Before its retreat at Corunna in January 1809, the number of British soldiers in the Peninsula did not exceed 40,000 men under Lieutenant-General Moore, though Wellington's Anglo-Portuguese army increased to around 72,000 infantry and cavalry under his command at the Battle of Vitoria in 1813. The King's German Legion (KGL) and the British-trained Portuguese Army were also under his command throughout the Peninsular War. Many British politicians were opposed to the war in Europe and favoured withdrawal, which hampered its will to muster a larger force to defeat Napoleon. This served in sharpening Wellington's awareness that a defensive strategy was essential, initially, to ensure the British Army survived. At Waterloo, of his roughly 73,000 strong army, around 26,000 (36 per cent) were British, though this relatively low number was due to the majority of his Peninsular veterans being shipped elsewhere after Napoleon's first abdication, many being sent to North America to serve in the final months of the War of 1812 against the United States.

Wellington faced armies formed from the disbanded French Grande Armée, once an overpowering force, which having conquered Europe and expanded the French Empire had been led by Napoleon and his marshals since 1804. It had been reformed into multiple smaller and more mobile armies from October 1808. In the Peninsula the French were grouped into multiple armies, each operating chiefly in its own area, in order to secure Portugal and Spain. These forces were commanded by French marshals, senior generals chosen for elevation by Napoleon himself. Though these armies were under the nominal command of Napoleon's brother, King Joseph Bonaparte, the marshals commanded their armies with a high degree of independence. Wellington arrived in Lisbon in 1809 with an army composed mostly of volunteers. British troops were better trained than their French counterparts and were required to repeatedly practice firing with live rounds before encountering combat. Napoleon only personally campaigned in Spain once, between October 1808 and January 1809, taking most of his Guard and many elite troops with him when he left. After the disastrous failure of the invasion of Russia, Napoleon weakened his forces in Spain in early 1813 by redeploying many veteran troops from the Peninsula to Germany to shore up his losses. Subsequently, many of the remaining troops became a second line in quality, experience and equipment – new recruits were often not French.

Wellington's army consisted of four combat arms: Infantry, cavalry and artillery. Engineers also played a valuable role in the Peninsula, such as the building of the Lines of Torres Vedras – a defensive line of forts built to protect Lisbon – and making preparations for any sieges throughout the war. Wellington's main combat arm was his well-trained infantry. He never had more than 2,000 cavalry before 1812, and his cannons, although highly competent, were inferior to French guns in both number and quality. It was with this force that Wellington aimed to defend Portugal until he took to an offensive strategy in 1812, beating the French at the Battle of Salamanca. He advanced on to Madrid, arriving on 12 August 1812 – Joseph Bonaparte had abandoned the capital after the defeat at Salamanca.

The Spanish government made Wellington commander-in-chief of all allied armies, providing an extra 21,000 Spanish troops after Salamanca. Although not completely undefeated, he never lost a major battle. His greatest defeat came at the siege of Burgos in 1812, where he had hoped to prevent French forces concentrating. After losing 2,000 men and causing only 600 French casualties he was forced to raise the siege and retreat, calling it "the worst scrape I was ever in." Retiring to winter quarters, where he received reinforcements that brought his regular army up to 75,000 men, Wellington began his final offensive in June 1813. He advanced north, through the Pyrenees, and into France itself. The French were no longer fighting to keep Spain but to defend their own border.

Ultimately, between the battles of Roliça (August 1808) and Toulouse (April 1814), the war against the French lasted for six years, with Wellington finally managing to drive the French from the Iberian Peninsula. Shortly thereafter, on 12 April 1814, word reached Wellington that Napoleon had abdicated on 6 April. The Peninsular War was over. Wellington and his army had marched over an estimated 6,000 miles (9,656 km) and fought in many engagements through Portugal and Spain, the consequences of which helped bring the downfall of Napoleon, resulting in peace across Europe.

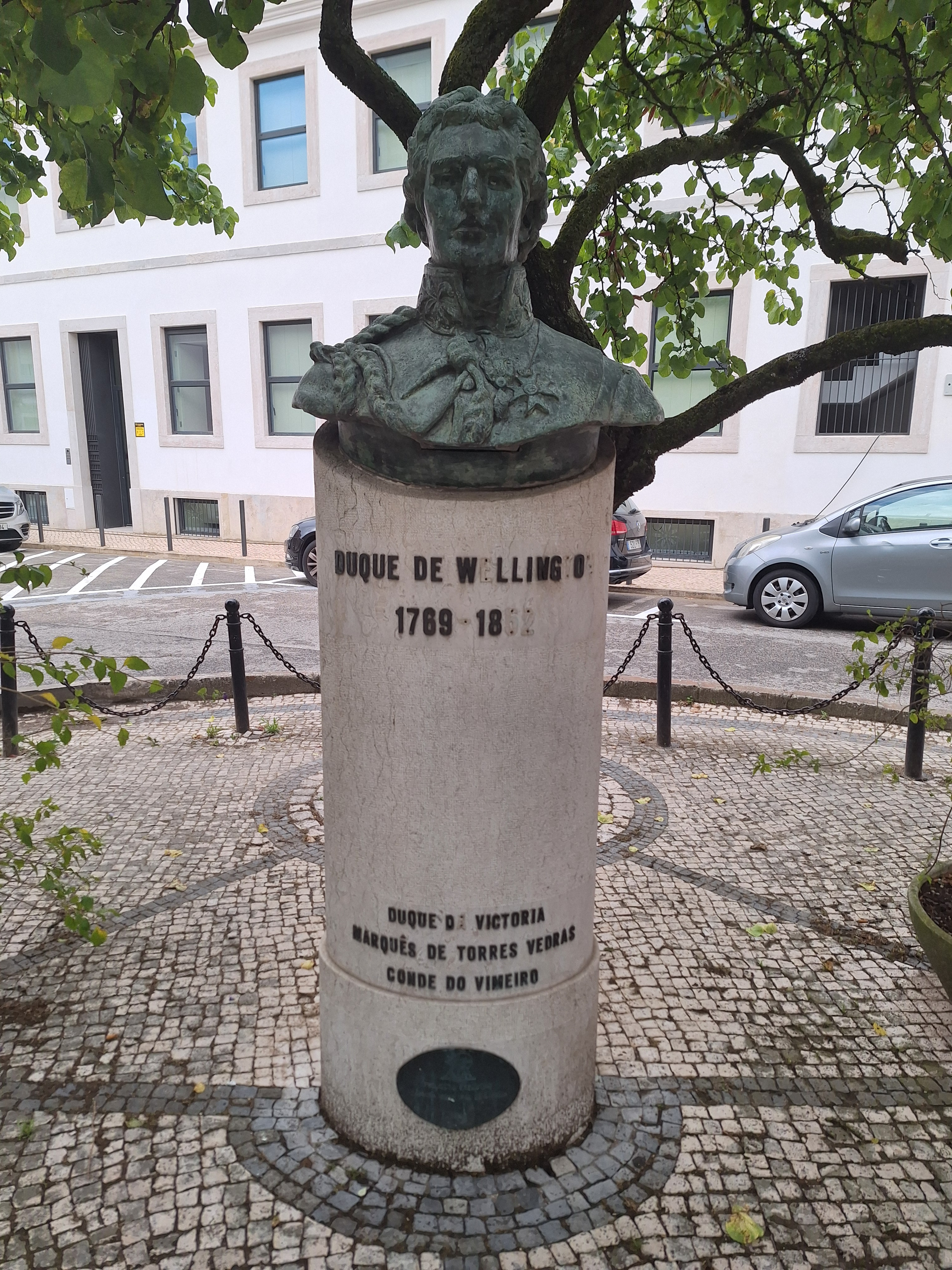
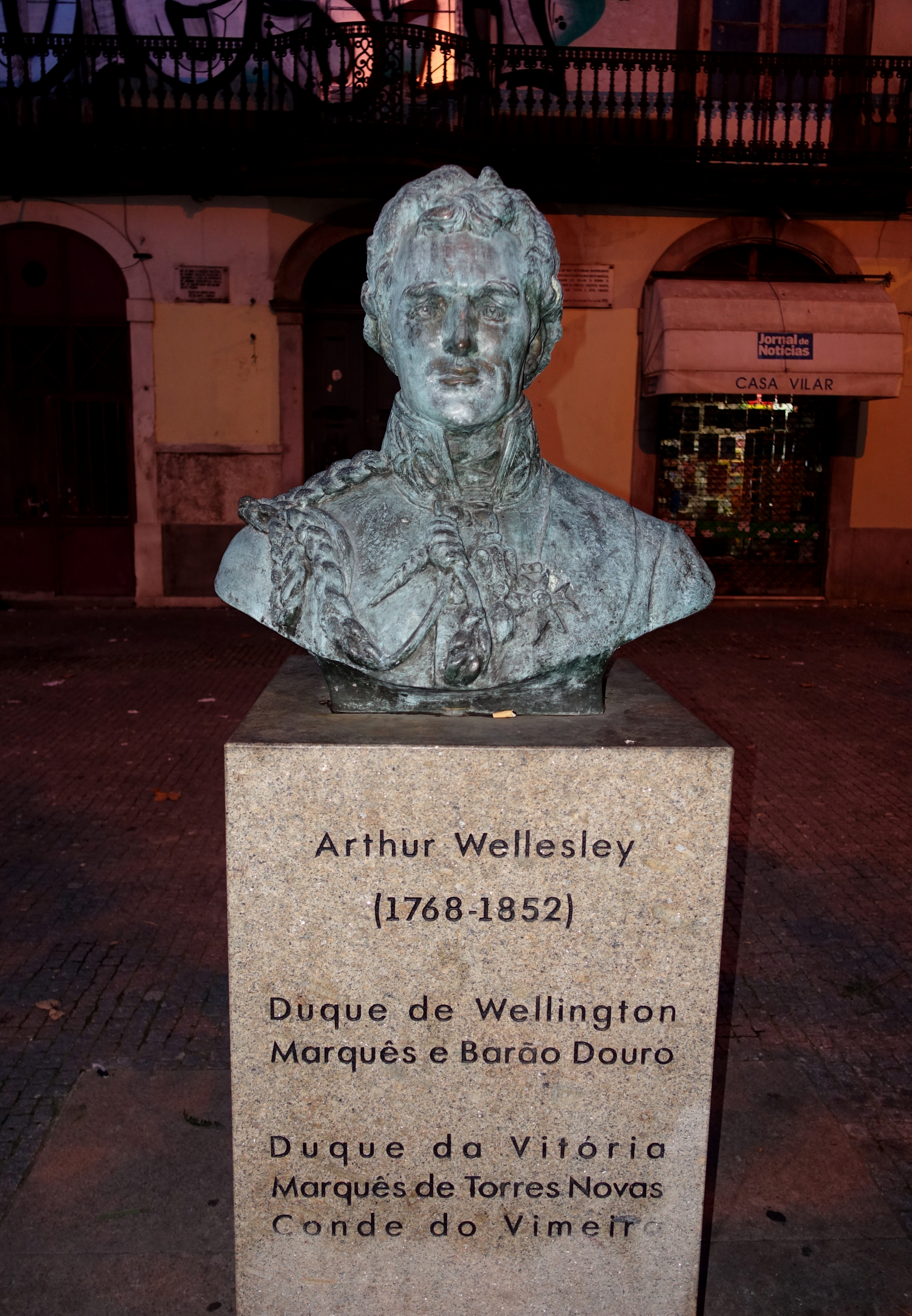
Busts of the Duke of Wellington in Lisbon (left) and Porto (right), Portugal, commemorating his victories during the Peninsular War.

== Battle record ==
There are a large number of battles attributed to Wellington. Although many leave the impression that he was present or in command at those actions, it was sometimes the case that he entrusted other officers to engage the enemy, such as at remote locations, and that he could not have attended them all in person. Similarly, Wellington was not usually in command of rear guard actions, during advances or retreats, despite his army engaging in them often. Engagements where the lack of his presence is absolutely certain, or where his position is unconfirmed by records and accounts, are not included in his battle record.

Key to opponent flags

(France) French First Republic (1792–1804)	(France) First French Empire (1804–1814; 1815)	Kingdom of Mysore	Maratha Empire	Denmark

Key to outcome

* Indicates a decisive victory

Date	Conflict	Action	Opponent	Type	Country	Rank	Outcome	Notes
15 Sep 1794	Flanders Campaign	Battle of Boxtel	(France)	Battle	Dutch Republic	Lieutenant-Colonel	Defeat	
27 Mar 1799	Fourth Anglo-Mysore War	Battle of Mallavelly	(Kingdom of Mysore)	Battle	Kingdom of Mysore, India	Colonel	Victory	
5 Apr – 4 May 1799	Fourth Anglo-Mysore War	Siege of Seringapatam	(Kingdom of Mysore)	Siege	Kingdom of Mysore, India	Colonel	Victory*	
5–6 Apr 1799	Fourth Anglo-Mysore War	Battle of Sultanpet Tope	(Kingdom of Mysore)	Battle	Kingdom of Mysore, India	Colonel	Victory (Note: Although the Battle of Sultanpet Tope was an overall British victory, Wellesley's initial night attack on 5 April was poorly coordinated and repelled; he was wounded. The engagement was won the next day in a renewed daylight attack.)	
27 Jun 1800	Waugh Insurgency	Siege of Rannee Bednore	—	Siege	India	Colonel	Victory	
14 Jul 1800	Waugh Insurgency	Siege of Koongdul	—	Siege	India	Colonel	Victory	
26 Jul 1800	Waugh Insurgency	Siege of Dummul	—	Siege	India	Colonel	Victory	
31 Jul 1800	Waugh Insurgency	Action at Manowly	—	Skirmish	India	Colonel	Victory	
10 Sep 1800	Waugh Insurgency	Battle of Conagul	—	Battle	India	Colonel	Victory*	
8–12 Aug 1803	Second Anglo-Maratha War	Siege of Ahmednagar	(Maratha Empire)	Siege	Maratha Empire, India	Major-General	Victory	
23 Sep 1803	Second Anglo-Maratha War	Battle of Assaye	(Maratha Empire)	Battle	Maratha Empire, India	Major-General	Victory*	
28 Nov 1803	Second Anglo-Maratha War	Battle of Argaon	(Maratha Empire)	Battle	Maratha Empire, India	Major-General	Victory	
15 Dec 1803	Second Anglo-Maratha War	Siege of Gawilghur	(Maratha Empire)	Siege	Maratha Empire, India	Major-General	Victory	
29 Aug 1807	English Wars	Battle of Køge (Note: Part of the Battle of Copenhagen.)	(Denmark)	Battle	Denmark	Major-General	Victory*	
17 Aug 1808	Peninsular War	Battle of Roliça	(France)	Battle	Portugal	Lieutenant-General	Victory	
21 Aug 1808	Peninsular War	Battle of Vimeiro	(France)	Battle	Portugal	Lieutenant-General	Victory*	
10–11 May 1809	Peninsular War	Battle of Grijó	(France)	Battle	Portugal	Lieutenant-General	Victory	
12 May 1809	Peninsular War	Second Battle of Porto (Note: The First Battle of Porto took place on 28 March 1809 when the French initially seized the city from Anglo-Portuguese forces.)	(France)	Battle	Portugal	Lieutenant-General	Victory	
27 Jul 1809	Peninsular War	Combat of Casa de Salinas (Note: The skirmish at Casa de Salinas was a preliminary combat action fought prior to the Battle of Talavera.)	(France)	Skirmish	Portugal	Lieutenant-General	Indecisive	
27–28 Jul 1809	Peninsular War	Battle of Talavera	(France)	Battle	Spain	Lieutenant-General	Indecisive	
27 Sep 1810	Peninsular War	Battle of Bussaco	(France)	Battle	Portugal	Lieutenant-General	Victory	
9–11 Mar 1811	Peninsular War	Battle of Pombal	(France)	Skirmish	Portugal	Lieutenant-General	Indecisive	
12 Mar 1811	Peninsular War	Battle of Redinha	(France)	Battle	Portugal	Lieutenant-General	Indecisive	
15 Mar 1811	Peninsular War	Combat of Foz de Arouce	(France)	Skirmish	Portugal	Lieutenant-General	Victory	
29 Mar 1811	Peninsular War	Combat of Guarda	(France)	Skirmish	Portugal	Lieutenant-General	Victory	
3 Apr 1811	Peninsular War	Battle of Sabugal	(France)	Battle	Portugal	Lieutenant-General	Victory	
3–5 May 1811	Peninsular War	Battle of Fuentes de Oñoro	(France)	Battle	Portugal	Lieutenant-General	Victory	
5 May – 16 Jun 1811	Peninsular War	Second siege of Badajoz (Note: The first siege of Badajoz took place on 26 January – 11 March 1811 when the French initially besieged the Spanish town.)	(France)	Siege	Spain	General	Defeat	
25 Sep 1811	Peninsular War	Combat of El Bodón	(France)	Skirmish	Spain	General	Defeat	
27 Sep 1811	Peninsular War	Combat of Aldea da Ponte	(France)	Skirmish	Spain	General	Indecisive	
7–20 Jan 1812	Peninsular War	Siege of Ciudad Rodrigo	(France)	Siege	Spain	General	Victory	
16 Mar – 6 Apr 1812	Peninsular War	Third siege of Badajoz	(France)	Siege	Spain	General	Victory	
17–27 Jun 1812	Peninsular War	Siege of the Salamanca Forts	(France)	Siege	Spain	General	Victory	
18 Jul 1812	Peninsular War	Combat of Castrillo	(France)	Skirmish	Spain	General	Victory	
22 Jul 1812	Peninsular War	Battle of Salamanca	(France)	Battle	Spain	General	Victory*	
19 Sep – 21 Oct 1812	Peninsular War	Siege of Burgos	(France)	Siege	Spain	General	Defeat	
23 Oct 1812	Peninsular War	Battle of Venta del Pozo	(France)	Skirmish	Spain	General	Defeat	
25–29 Oct 1812	Peninsular War	Battle of Tordesillas	(France)	Battle	Spain	General	Defeat	
10–11 Nov 1812	Peninsular War	Combat of Alba de Tormes	(France)	Skirmish	Spain	General	Victory	
17 Nov 1812	Peninsular War	Combat of Huebra, San Muñoz	(France)	Skirmish	Spain	General	Defeat	
21 Jun 1813	Peninsular War	Battle of Vitoria	(France)	Battle	Spain	General	Victory*	
7 Jul – 25 Jul 1813	Peninsular War	Siege of San Sebastián (Note: Two attempts were made to storm San Sebastian, in 1813. The first, on 25 July, Wellington was present at to oversee this attempt, but he did not attend the second attempt on 31 August – evident from his dispatches.)	(France)	Siege	Spain	Field Marshal	Defeat	
26–1 Aug 1813	Peninsular War	Battle of Sorauren (Note: Part of the Battle of the Pyrenees.)	(France)	Battle	Spain	Field Marshal	Victory	
2 Aug 1813	Peninsular War	Combat of Echalar	(France)	Skirmish	Spain	Field Marshal	Victory	
7 Oct 1813	Peninsular War	Battle of the Bidassoa	(France)	Battle	France	Field Marshal	Victory	
10 Nov 1813	Peninsular War	Battle of Nivelle	(France)	Battle	France	Field Marshal	Victory	
9–12 Dec 1813	Peninsular War	Battle of the Nive	(France)	Battle	France	Field Marshal	Victory	
15 Feb 1814	Peninsular War	Battle of Garris	(France)	Battle	France	Field Marshal	Victory	
27 Feb 1814	Peninsular War	Battle of Orthez	(France)	Battle	France	Field Marshal	Victory	
20 Mar 1814	Peninsular War	Battle of Tarbes	(France)	Battle	France	Field Marshal	Victory	
8 Apr 1814	Peninsular War	Combat of Croix d'Orade	(France)	Skirmish	France	Field Marshal	Victory	
10 Apr 1814	Peninsular War	Battle of Toulouse	(France)	Battle	France	Field Marshal	Indecisive	
16 Jun 1815	Hundred Days	Battle of Quatre Bras	(France)	Battle	United Kingdom of the Netherlands	Field Marshal	Indecisive	
18 Jun 1815	Hundred Days	Battle of Waterloo	(France)	Battle	United Kingdom of the Netherlands	Field Marshal	Victory*	

== See also ==
- Arms, titles, honours and styles of Arthur Wellesley, 1st Duke of Wellington
- Batons of Arthur Wellesley, 1st Duke of Wellington
- British Army during the Napoleonic Wars
- British soldiers in the eighteenth century
- Seringapatam medal
- Army Gold Medal
- Military General Service Medal
- Waterloo Medal

== Sources ==
- Adkin, Mark (2001). The Waterloo Companion: The Complete Guide to History's Most Famous Land Battle. London: Aurum Press. ISBN 978-1854107640.
- Ayrton, Michael; Taylor, John (2008). The Sharpest Fight: The 95th Rifles at Tarbes, 20th March 1814. London: Forbitou Books. ISBN 978-0955486005.
- Barnett, Correlli (1997) [First published 1978]. Bonaparte. Ware, UK: Wordsworth Editions. ISBN 978-1853266782.
- Bowring, Lewin (1893). Haidar Alí and Tipú Sultán, and the Struggle with the Musalmán Powers of the South. Oxford: Clarendon Press.
- Burton, Major R.G. (2009) [First published 1908]. Wellington's Campaigns in India. Uckfield, UK: Naval and Military Press. ISBN 978-1845743307.
- Chandler, David (1999) [First published 1993]. Dictionary of the Napoleonic Wars. Ware, UK: Wordsworth Editions. ISBN 978-1840222036.
- Chartrand, René (2001a). Vimeiro 1808. Oxford: Osprey Publishing. ISBN 978-1841763095.
- ——— (2001b). Bussaco 1810. Oxford: Osprey Publishing. ISBN 978-1841763101.
- ——— (2001c). Fuentes de Oñoro. Oxford: Osprey Publishing. ISBN 978-1841763118.
- Corrigan, Gordon (2006) [First published 2001]. Wellington: A Military Life. London: Hambledon Continuum. ISBN 978-1852855154.
- Davies, Huw J. (2012). Wellington's Wars: The Making of a Military Genius. London: Yale University Press. ISBN 978-0300208658.
- Fletcher, Ian; Younghusband, Tony (1997). Salamanca 1812. Oxford: Osprey Publishing. ISBN 978-1855326040.
- Fletcher, Ian (1996). Vittoria 1813. Oxford: Osprey Publishing. ISBN 978-1855327399.
- ——— (2003). Fortresses of the Peninsular 1808–14. Oxford: Osprey Publishing. ISBN 978-1841765778.
- ——— (2005) [First published 1994]. Wellington's Regiments: The Men and their Battles 1808–1815. Kent, UK: Spellmount. ISBN 978-1873376065.
- Fremont-Barnes, Gregory, ed. (2006). The Encyclopedia of the French Revolutionary and Napoleonic Wars. Santa Barbara, CA: ABC-CLIO. ISBN 978-1851096466.
- Gates, David (2002) [1st pub. 1986]. The Spanish Ulcer: A History of the Peninsular War. London: Pimlico. ISBN 978-0712697309.
- Glover, Michael (1974). The Peninsular War 1807–1814: A Concise Military History. David & Charles.
- Griffith, Paddy (2007). French Napoleonic Infantry Tactics 1792–1815. Oxford: Osprey Publishing. ISBN 978-1846032783.
- Haythornthwaite, Philip J. (1998) [First published 1994]. The Armies of Wellington. London: Brockhampton Press. ISBN 978-1860198496.
- Hibbert, Christopher (1998). Wellington: A Personal History. London: HarperCollins. ISBN 978-0586091098.
- Holmes, Richard (2007) [First published 2003]. Wellington The Iron Duke. London: HarperCollins. ISBN 978-0007137503.
- Howarth, David (1997) [First published 1968]. Waterloo: A Near Run Thing (Reissued 2003 ed.). London: Phoenix. ISBN 978-1842127193.
- Jaques, Tony (2006). Dictionary of Battles and Sieges. Santa Barbara, CA: Greenwood. ISBN 978-0313335365.
- Keegan, John; Wheatcroft, Andrew (1976). Who's Who in Military History: From 1453 to the Present Day. London: Weidenfeld & Nicolson. ISBN 978-0297771388.
- Longford, Elizabeth (1969). Wellington: The Years of The Sword. London: Weidenfeld & Nicolson. ISBN 978-0297179177.
- Millar, Simon (2006). Assaye 1803: Wellington's Bloodiest Battle. Oxford: Osprey Publishing. ISBN 978-1846030017.
- Morgan, Matthew (2004). Wellington's Victories: A Guide to Sharpe's Army. London: Andrews McMeel Publishing. ISBN 978-1843170938.
- Napier, Sir William Francis Patrick (1835–40). History of the War in the Peninsula and in the South of France from the Year 1807 to the Year 1814. Vols. I–VI. London: Thomas & William Boone.
- ——— (1852). English Battles and Sieges in The Peninsula: Extracted from his 'Peninsula War'. London: Chapman and Hall.
- Riley, Jonathon P. (2000). Napoleon and the World War of 1813: Lessons in Coalition Warfighting. London: Routledge. ISBN 978-0714648934.
- Roberts, Andrew (2001). Napoleon and Wellington. London: Weidenfeld & Nicolson. ISBN 978-0297646075.
- Rothenberg, Gunther E. (1999). Keegan, John. ed. The Napoleonic Wars. London: Cassell & Co. ISBN 978-0304352678.
- Savoury, A.C.S.; Isles, Major General D.E. (1987). A Short History of The Duke of Wellington's Regiment (West Riding). Halifax, UK: Reuben Holroyd.
- Smith, Digby (1998). The Greenhill Napoleonic Wars Data Book. London: Greenhill Books. ISBN 978-1853672767.
- Thornton, Esq., Edward (1857). A Gazetteer of the Territories Under the Government of the East-India Company, and of the Native States on the Continent of India. London: Wm. H. Allen & Co.
- Urban, Mark (2003). Rifles. London: Faber and Faber. ISBN 978-0571216819.
- Weller, Jac (1993) [1st pub. 1972]. Wellington in India. London: Greenhill Books. ISBN 978-1853673979.
- Wellesley, Arthur (1837–1839). Gurwood, John. ed. The dispatches of Field Marshal the Duke of Wellington: During his various campaigns in India, Denmark, Portugal, Spain, the Low Countries, and France, from 1799 to 1818. Vols. I–XII. London: John Murray.
