= Humphrey Style =

Humphrey Style may refer to:

- Humphrey Style (Esquire of the Body) (died 1557) of Langley Park, Beckenham Kent, an Esquire of the Body of Henry VIII of England and a sheriff of Kent
- Sir Humphrey Style, 1st Baronet (c. 1596–1659) of Beckenham, Kent, courtier to kings James I and Charles I of England.
