= Dhondia Wagh =

Indian soldier

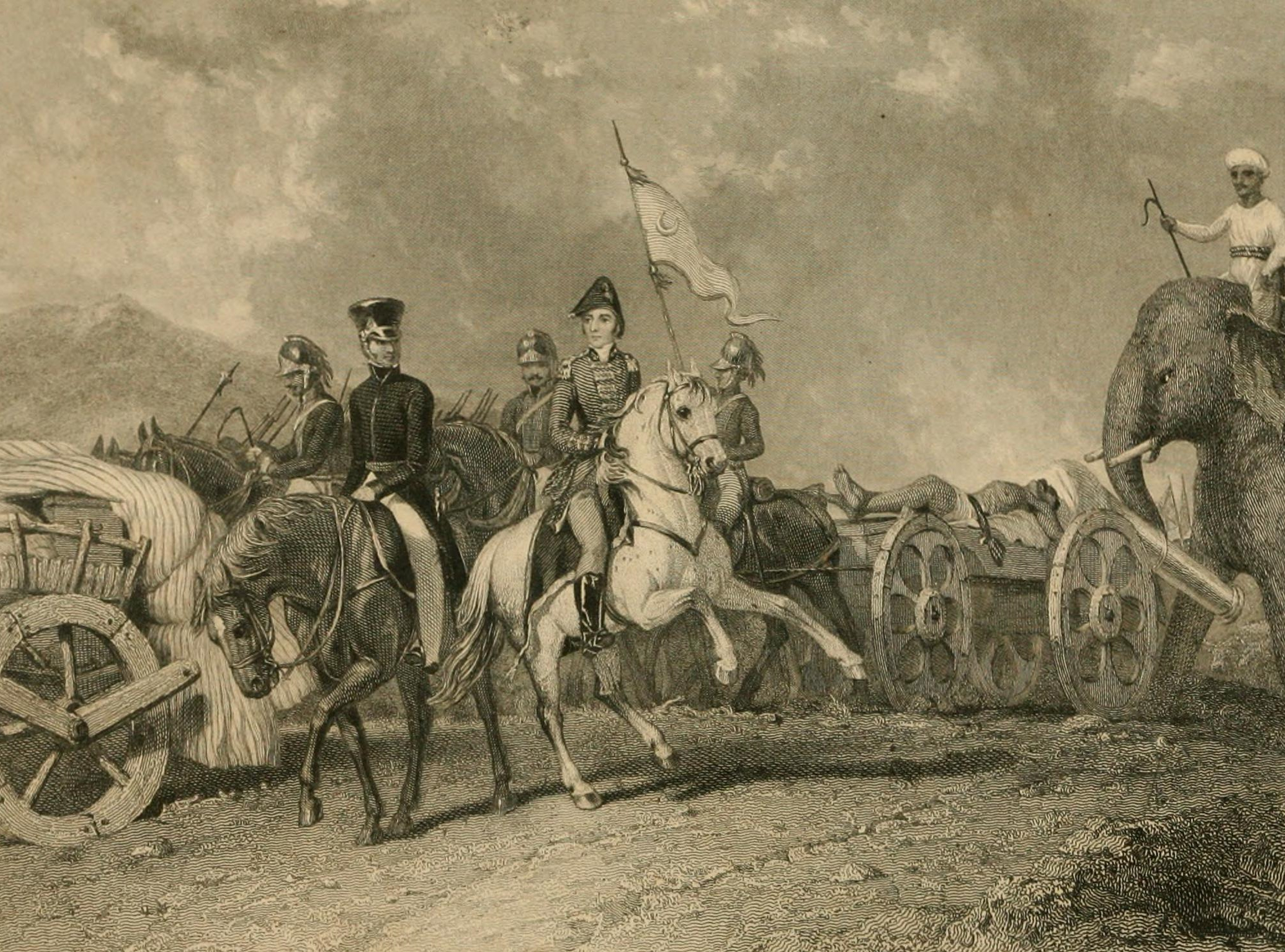
- Wagh's body after the Battle of Conagul
- Born: Channagiri
- Died: 10 September 1800; Hire Kotnekal in present-day Karnataka, India
- Other names: Dhondji Wagh, Dhondi Vagh, Dhundia, Dhoondia Waugh, Dhoondaji Waug, Dhoondiah Waugh, Dhundhia Wagh, Dundia Wagh, Dhondia Wagh, Dhoondia Wao, Doondia Wao, Shaikh Ahmad, Malik Jahan Khan
- Occupations: Soldier, Freebooter
- Years active: 18th century
- Known for: anti-East India Company insurgency in northern Mysore

Dhondia Wagh (died 10 September 1800) was a soldier and adventurer in 18th century India. He started his career in the service of Hyder Ali, the ruler of Mysore. During the Third Anglo-Mysore War, he deserted Ali's successor Tipu Sultan, and subsequently raided territories on the Maratha-Mysore border. After the Marathas forced him to retreat, he sought refuge from Tipu and converted to Islam, changing his name to Malik Jahan Khan. After Tipu's death in the Fourth Anglo-Mysore War, he raised a force comprising soldiers from the former Mysore Army, and took control of northern part of the Mysore Kingdom. As the leader of the Waugh Insurgency, he styled himself as Ubhaya-Lokadheeshwara ("King of two Worlds"). The British East India Company as well as the Maratha Peshwa sent armies to check his rising power. He was ultimately defeated and killed by a British force led by Arthur Wellesley.

== Early life ==
Dhondia Wagh was born at Channagiri in the Kingdom of Mysore (present-day Karnataka). He belonged to a Maratha family of the Pawar clan. During the reign of Hyder Ali, he joined Mysore's army as a trooper under the command of Bishnu Pandit. Gradually, he rose to the position of a shiledar (cavalry officer) during the reign of Tipu Sultan.

== After Third Anglo-Mysore War ==
During the Third Anglo-Mysore War, Wagh left Tipu's service, taking along several soldiers as well as considerable wealth. He took shelter under the desai (Maratha revenue collector) of Lakshmeshwara. After the war ended in 1792, he proclaimed himself as the ruler of the areas on the Maratha-Mysore border. He started plundering villages and levied taxes in areas around Dharwad. In January 1793, he captured Haveri, and occupied Savanur. He also started raiding other territories ceded by Mysore to the Marathas as per the Treaty of Seringapatam.

In 1794, the Maratha general Parashuram Bhau sent an army commanded by Dhondopant Gokhale (also known as Dhondu Pant) to check Wagh's rising power. Gokhale forced him to flee and seek shelter with Tipu Sultan in June 1794. Recognizing his ability as a warrior, Tipu forgave his past act of desertion and asked him to convert to Islam. Wagh adopted Islam, and was given a new name "Shaikh Ahmad", although he preferred to style himself as "Malik Jahan Khan". He was given a military command in the Mysore Army. However, sometime later, he fell out of Tipu's favour, and was imprisoned. At one point, Tipu considered releasing Wagh, but his minister Mir Sadiq dissuaded him from doing so.

== After Fourth Anglo-Mysore War ==
After the British East India Company defeated Tipu Sultan in 1799, Dhondia Wagh and other prisoners were freed by the British troops. Wagh reached Shikaripur, where he raised a band of soldiers from Tipu's former army. He gained support of Krishnappa Nayaka of Balam, and declared himself Ubhaya-Lokadheeshwara (King of the Two Worlds). He also assumed the title of Nayaka of Bidnur (in the style of the Nayakas of Keladi). While the British were busy strengthening their hold over Mysore, Wagh started collecting taxes from traders and cultivators in and around Shimoga. The polygar feudal lords of Hangal, Harpanahalli, Ranebennuru, Savanur, Sodhe and Vittal acknowledged his suzerainty. At the height of his power, he is believed to have gathered an army of 90,000 cavalry and 80,000 infantry. By July 1799, he had become enough of a nuisance for the British to send a force against him.

In 1799, Wagh led a small band northwards, and raided territories located around the Maratha-Mysore border. He entered the present-day Dharwad district with 300 men, and sought an alliance with the Maratha chief Dhondopant Gokhale, who had earlier helped rogue mercenaries plunder territories in Dharwad. However, Gokhale did not entertain him. In fact, he launched a surprise attack on Wagh's camp and plundered it. Wagh then vowed to "dye his mustache in the blood of Gokhale's heart". Subsequently, he took shelter in Kolhapur but had to leave after a conflict with the local authorities. He returned to Shimoga and then re-entered Dharwad with a larger force. In 1800, he occupied Savannur, followed by Dambal on 4 May. By this time, he controlled all the forts in the present-day Haveri district, with the exception of Havanur. He also captured the Jamalabad fort built by Tipu. Several soldiers disbanded from Aurangabad, Hyderabad and Kadapa joined him.

=== Wellesley's campaign ===
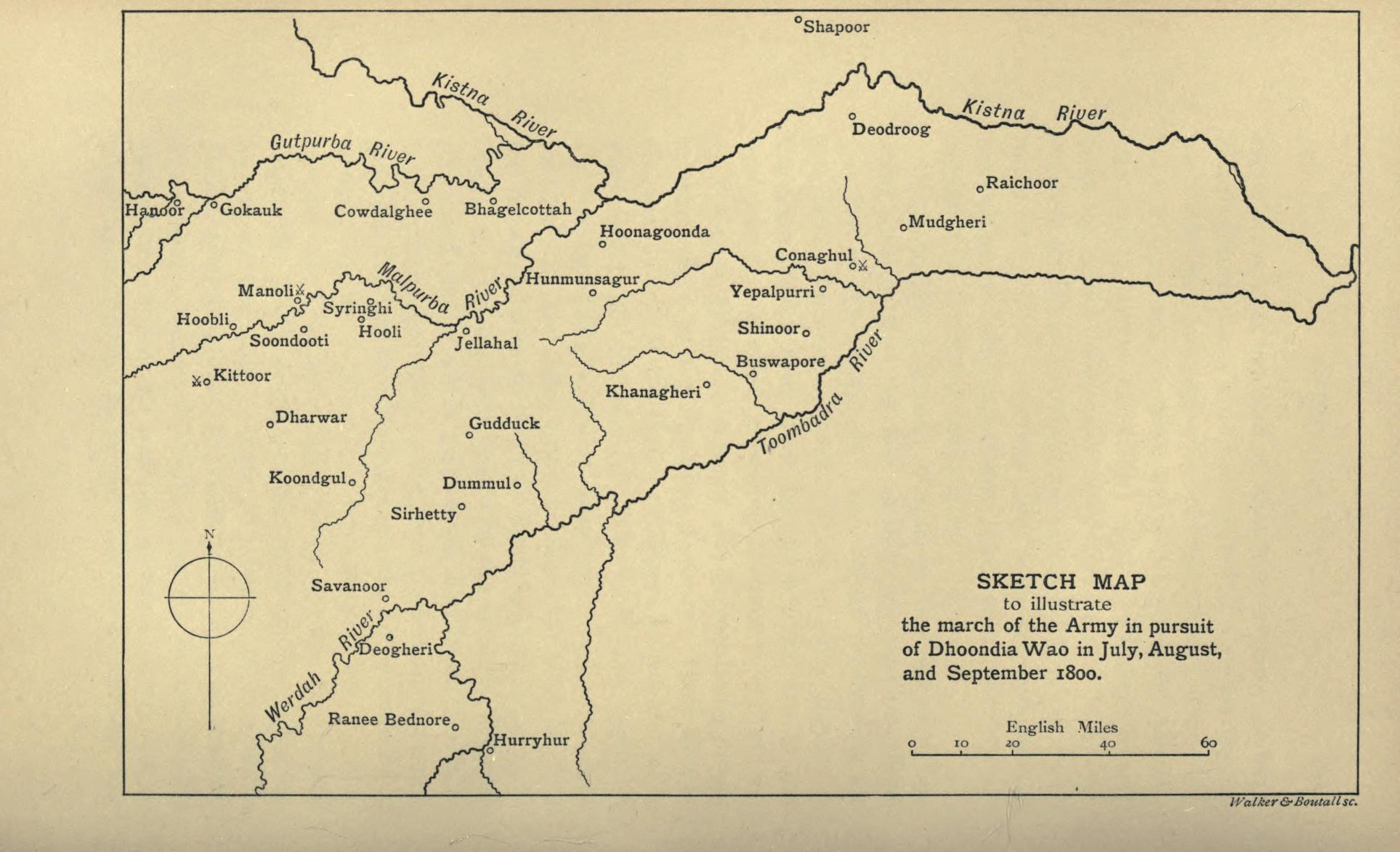
Map to illustrate the march of the British Army in pursuit of Dhondia Wagh in July, August and September 1800

Alarmed at his rising power, the British decided to send a strong force against him. In May 1800, the newly-appointed British Governor of Mysore General Wellesley was given his first independent command. Describing the seriousness of Wagh's insurgency, General Wellesley wrote to the Governor General Marquess Wellesley on 26 May:

If we do not get him, we must expect a general insurrection of all the discontented and disaffected of these countries. I have information that letters have been received by most of them, either from him, or from others written in his name, calling upon them to take the opportunity to rebel against the Company's government, or that of their allies; and his invasion of our territory is looked to as a circumstance favorable to their views. The destruction of this man, therefore, is absolutely necessary for our tranquillity.

In June 1800, Wellesley gathered a force made up of the 25th Light Dragoons, 73rd Foot, 77th Foot and native troops at Chitradurga. As the British advanced towards him, Wagh fled to Maratha-controlled territory. General Wellesley obtained permission from the Maratha Peshwa to pursue Wagh in the Maratha territory. The Peshwa also dispatched a Maratha force led by Chintamanrao Patwardhan against Wagh. Wellesley reached Harihar on 16 June; Wagh, meanwhile, fled and reached Hubli on 19 June. On 20 June, Wellesley's men captured the Airani fort. Over the next week, the British also captured the Ranibennur fort. The British handed over all these forts to Patwardhan for his help. The British also stormed the Bidnur fort on 27 June, but Wagh still remained elusive.

Meanwhile, Dhondopant Gokhale, with his two nephews Appaji Ganesh and Bapuji Ganesh, also joined Patwardhan's Maratha force. On 30 June, the Marathas attacked Wagh at Dawangi Nala near Kittur. Dhondopant Gokhale and his few men, separated from the main army, were caught in an ambush. Wagh killed Gokhale and his nephew Appaji at Londa, and is said to have literally fulfilled his vow by colouring his mustache with Gokhale's blood. Patwardhan then attacked Wagh, but was severely injured in the battle. Along with Bapuji Gokhale and other Marathas, he had to take refuge in the British-controlled fort at Haliyal.

On 4 July 1800, General Wellesley sent a letter to Patwardhan, praising his bravery in the battle, and invited him to join the British operations against Wagh. The British forces continued pursuing Wagh, and took control of Savanur on 12 July. Wellesley's advance was slowed down by bad weather. Meanwhile, Wagh had advanced towards Kittur, before retreating to Kundgol after hearing about Wellesley's army. He left 600 soldiers at Kundgol, and reached Annigeri on 17 July, via Kanavi. On 25 July, Wellesley met Patwardhan, and made plans to fight Wagh. The next day, a joint British-Maratha force captured the Dambal fort, which was being guarded by a thousand of Wagh's men. Wagh continue to evade the enemy forces, traversing Saundatti, Annigeri, Munavalli, Kittur, Khanapur and Badami. By the end of July, Wellesley's forces had captured nearly all of Wagh's former territories. After several of Wagh's men deserted him, he fled towards the Nizam's territory. On 30 July, the British managed to launch a surprise attacked on Wagh's forces when the latter were crossing the Malaprabha River at Manoh. Wagh managed to escape, but Wellesley's force pursued him in three separate columns, supported by the Marathas and the Nizam. There were several confrontations between the two parties during August 1800.

On 25 August, Wagh managed to cross the Malaprabha river. On 9 September, a column led by Colonel Stevenson succeeded in intercepting Wagh. The next morning, Wagh was killed in a battle with General Wellesley's 19th Light Dragoons near Konagal or Conaghalli (in present-day Raichur district). According to the Maratha chronicles, Wellesley took away his blood-stained mustaches to England as a trophy. Wellesley offered protection to Wagh's 4-year old son Salabat Khan, and paid for his maintenance before he left for Europe. When he grew up, Salabat Khan was employed by the King of Mysore. He died of cholera in 1822.
