= Humphrey Style (Esquire of the Body) =

Sir Humphrey Style (died 1552) of Langley Park, Beckenham, Kent, England, was an Esquire of the Body of Henry VIII and a sheriff of Kent.

== Biography ==
Style was the son of John Stile (died 1505), alderman of London, and Elizabeth, daughter and coheir of Sir Guy Wolston of London. (Note: John Stile (died 1505) was the son of William Style of Ipswich. He was of the Worshipful Company of Mercers and requested burial in their church of St. Thomas of Acre. He acquired the estate at Langley in Kent. Hasted describes that he was buried in All Hallows-by-the-Tower church, London.) but John Style has been confused with at least two other John Styles of the same period. However, John Stile's will 1505, Prerogative Court of Canterbury refers to Langley and Beknam (sic). Hasted's record may also have been quoting Philipot 1659.

Humphrey Style was said to be one of the Esquires of the Body to Henry VIII, and Sheriff of Kent in 1543. The Hasted reference appears to originate in Villare Cantianum, Philipot 1659 but cannot be confirmed from court records?

Style procured a grant from Sir Thomas Wriothesley, Garter principal king at arms, reciting, that not being willing to bear arms in prejudice to the other branches of his family, he had petitioned for a coat, with a proper difference, which the said king at arms, in 1529, granted, under his hand and seal: Sable, a fess engrailed between threefears de Us, within a bordure or, the fess fretted of the field. He also procured, with others, an act of parliament in 1549 (the 3rd years of reign Edward VI) for the disgavelling of his lands in the county of Kent. He died in 1557, and was buried in Beckenham church. The 'threefears de Us' appears to be a misread of three feathers de Lis which can be seen on the panelling now in the Philadelphia Museum of Art, the fleur de Lis are depicted on Humphrey's Coat of Arms on his memorial plaque/tomb panel in St. George's Church, Beckennam. and also resemble royal motifs.

== Family ==
With his first wife, Bridget, daughter of Sir Thomas Baldrey, Style had three sons:

- Edmund (born 1538), was born at Langley. His son William Style was the father of Sir Humphrey Style, 1st Baronet and his half brother William Style a barrister and noted court reporter.
- Oliver, who was Sheriff of London, and ancestor of the Styles, of the baronetcy of Watringbury.
- Nicholas, who was knighted.

His memorial in St. George's church Beckenham illustrates 9 children by his first wife Bridget Baldry (6 sons and 3 daughters) and 2 by his second wife Elizabeth Peryn, daughter of George Peryn Esquire (one son and one daughter). Records from Beckenham burial transcripts indicate that some children died in infancy or before reaching majority. His marriages and several children are recorded in the Style genealogy in the Visitation of London 1568. Seven baptisms of Stile's children are recorded in Lysons Environs of London, Maria and Humphrey by Elizabeth Peryn which would indicate that an earlier child named Humphrey by Bridget Baldry probably died before 1539 when parish records began. St. George's burial records and some children predeceased Sir Humphrey while others were minors after his death and would have been wards or step-children of Elizabeth's Peryn's second husband, Thomas Townesend. Lyson's records also list John, Oliver, Nicholas and Bridget born to Bridget Baldry before her death in 1548. The Philadelphia Museum of Art has panelling said to come from Red Lodge at Langley dated to 1529, attributed to John Stile but more likely related to Humphrey Stile's acquisition of a coat of arms and knighthood. The panelling depicts emblems associated with Catherine of Aragon (Pomegranates) and Royal emblems, fleur de Lis, Prince of Wales feathers and Tudor rose as well as carved portraiture.
