= Sir Thomas Style, 8th Baronet =

British aristocrat and politician

Sir Thomas Charles Style, 8th Baronet (1797-23 July 1879) was a British aristocrat and politician, who served as the Member of Parliament for Scarborough from 1837 to 1841.

Thomas Style was born in 1797, a younger son of Sir Charles Style, 6th Baronet. His elder brother, also Thomas Style, succeeded their father as the 7th Baronet in 1804, and died on active service with the Grenadier Guards during the Peninsular War in 1813. He was educated at the Royal Naval Academy, but later entered the Army, purchasing a commission as a cornet in the 19th Light Dragoons in 1816. He later became a magistrate, deputy-lieutenant, and later high sheriff for County Donegal, where the family had its estates. He married Isabella Cayley, daughter of the engineer George Cayley, in 1822.

He was elected to represent Scarborough in the 1837 general election, and stood down in 1841. He was a unionist and reformer, supporting extended suffrage and shorter Parliaments.

Sir Thomas died at his residence in Sydney Place, Bath, in 1879, where he had lived for some years, and was active in local Liberal politics. He left an estate valued at just below £60,000, with most of it left to his widow for her lifetime, and then to his cousin Henry Marsham Style, who had inherited the baronetcy.

Parliament of the United Kingdom
Preceded by Sir John Vanden-Bempde-Johnstone, Bt; Sir Frederick Trench	Member of Parliament for Scarborough; 1837–1841; With: Sir Frederick Trench	Succeeded by Sir John Vanden-Bempde-Johnstone, Bt; Sir Frederick Trench
Baronetage of England
Preceded by Sir Thomas Style, 7th Baronet	Baronet (of Wateringbury); 1813–1879	Succeeded by Sir William Henry Marsham Style, 9th Baronet
