= Battle of Conagul =

1800 battle of the Waugh Insurgency

- Part of the Waugh Insurgency
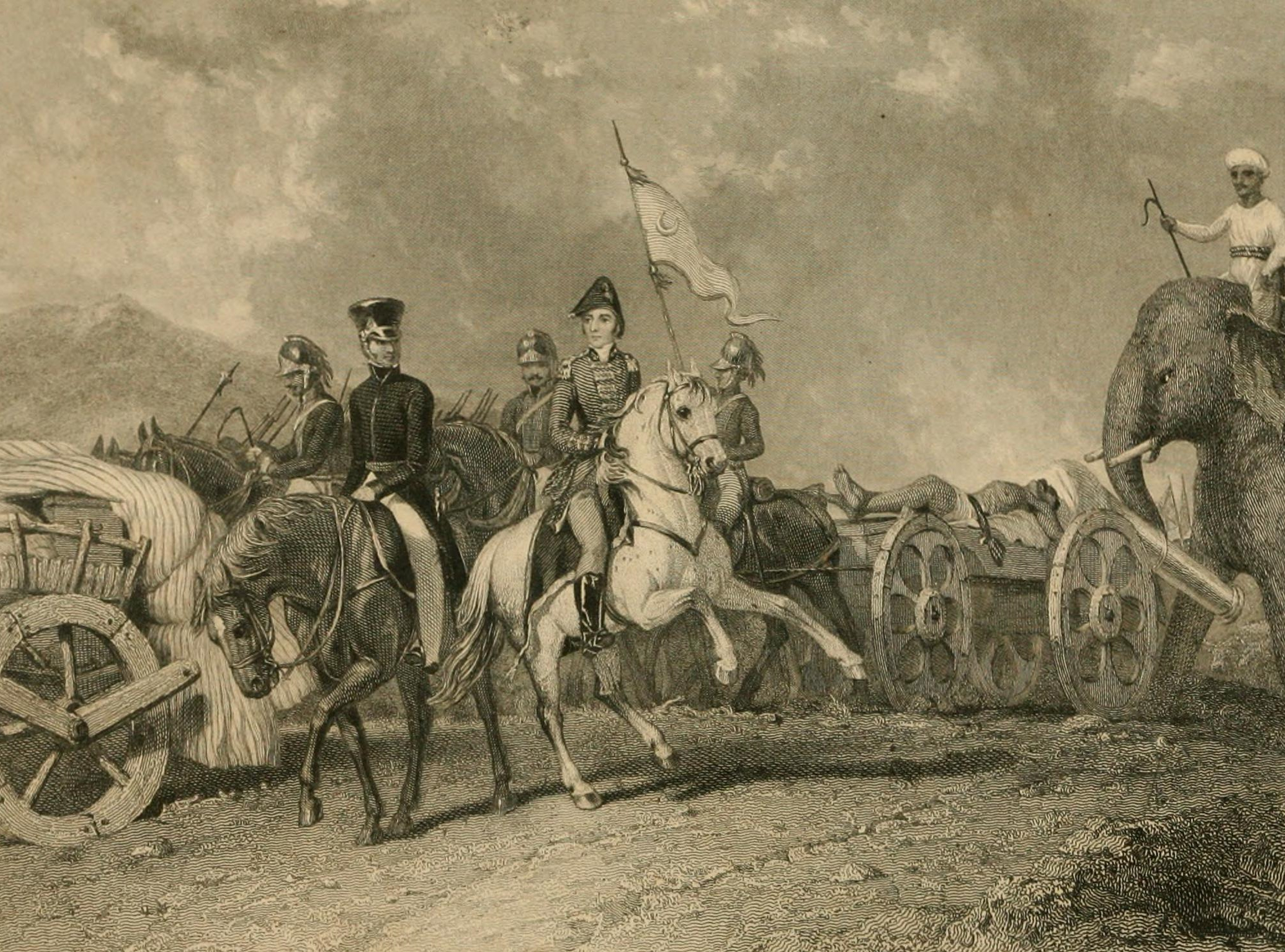
- 1917 illustration of the battle
Date	10 September 1800
Location	Near Conagul, Karnataka 16.001671°N 76.829935°E
Result	British victory

Belligerents
Great Britain; East India Company	Dhondia Wagh

Commanders and leaders
Arthur Wellesley	Dhondia Wagh

Strength
1,200	5,000

Casualties and losses
200–350 killed or wounded	600+ killed or wounded 100+ captured

The Battle of Conagul was a decisive cavalry engagement fought on 10 September 1800 during the Waugh Insurgency between a British force and an irregular army led by Dhondia Wagh. The battle took place near Conagul village in present-day Raichur district in Karnataka, India.

== Background ==
Following the fall of Tipu Sultan in 1799, Dhondia Wagh, a former Mysorean commander, escaped captivity and rallied a force of Maratha irregulars, disbanded Mysorean troops, and local insurgents. His growing influence in northern Karnataka posed a threat to British control in the region. Major-General Arthur Wellesley, commanding British and allied forces in the Deccan, was tasked with suppressing Dhoondia's insurgency. After weeks of pursuit, Wellesley's cavalry caught up with Wagh's force near Conaghul.

== Battle ==
Wellesley led a cavalry force of approximately 1,200, including the 19th Light Dragoons and native horsemen. Dhoondia Wagh's army was estimated to include over 5,000 cavalry, though many were irregular and poorly coordinated. The British cavalry executed a rapid and disciplined charge, breaking through Dhoondia's formation. Wagh's army was routed, and Wagh was killed in action, reportedly by a British sepoy.

== Aftermath ==
The victory at Conaghul effectively ended Wagh's insurgency and solidified British control over northern Karnataka. The battle also marked one of Arthur Wellesley's earliest independent field commands, showcasing his tactical decisiveness and leadership—a precursor to his later campaigns in India and Europe. Wellesley later described the campaign against Dhoondia as a formative experience, and the Battle of Conaghul remains a notable example of cavalry-led tempo warfare in colonial India.
