= John Stratton (cricketer) =

English cricketer

Personal information
- Full name: John William Stratton
- Born: 31 August 1875; Turweston, Buckinghamshire, England
- Died: 29 October 1919 (aged 44); Repton, Derbyshire, England
- Batting: Right-handed
- Bowling: Right-arm fast
- Relatives: Henry Tubb (brother-in-law)

Domestic team information
- Years: Team
- 1896: Oxford University
- 1895–1901: Buckinghamshire

Career statistics
Competition	First-class
Matches	1
Runs scored	8
Batting average	4.00
100s/50s	–/–
Top score	7
Balls bowled	120
Wickets	3
Bowling average	31.00
5 wickets in innings	–
10 wickets in match	–
Best bowling	3/93
Catches/stumpings	1/–
- Source: Cricinfo, 11 May 2011

John William Stratton (31 August 1875 – 29 October 1919) was an English cricketer. Stratton was a right-handed batsman who bowled right-arm fast. He was born in Turweston, Buckinghamshire and educated at Cheltenham College, where he represented the college cricket team, and Keble College, Oxford.

Stratton made his debut for Buckinghamshire in the 1895 Minor Counties Championship against Oxfordshire. He played Minor counties cricket for Buckinghamshire from 1895 to 1901, making 27 appearances. He made his only first-class appearance in 1896 for Oxford University against the Marylebone Cricket Club. He took 3 wickets in the MCC first-innings for the cost of 93 runs. His wickets were those of: Frank Phillips, Billy Murdoch and George Brann. With the bat he scored a single run in the university's first-innings, before being dismissed by Albert Trott. Oxford followed on in their second-innings, and he scored 7 runs before being dismissed by George Bean.

He died in Repton, Derbyshire on 29 October 1919.
