= Sir William Style, 9th Baronet =

English cricketer

William Style
Personal information
- Full name: William Henry Marsham Style
- Born: 3 September 1826; Bicester, Oxfordshire, England
- Died: 31 January 1904 (aged 77); Folkestone, Kent, England
- Batting: Right-handed
- Role: Wicket-keeper
- Relatives: Henry Tubb (brother-in-law)

Domestic team information
- Years: Team
- 1865: Hampshire

Career statistics
Competition	First-class
Matches	1
Runs scored	1
Batting average	0.50
100s/50s	–/–
Top score	1
Catches/stumpings	–/1
- Source: Cricinfo, 7 January 2010

Sir William Henry Marsham Style, 9th Baronet (3 September 1826 – 31 January 1904) was an English first-class cricketer.

The son of William Style, he was born at Bicester in September 1826. He was educated at Eton College, before going up to Merton College, Oxford. Style played first-class cricket for Hampshire against Surrey in 1865 at The Oval. Batting twice in the match, he was dismissed twice by Will Mortlock for scores of 0 and 1; playing as Hampshire's wicket-keeper, he made a single stumping. He succeeded his cousin Sir Thomas Style as the 9th Baronet of the Style baronets upon his death in July 1879. Style was appointed High Sheriff of Donegal in 1856 and four years later he served as a deputy lieutenant for the county. He later served as a deputy lieutenant for Monmouthshire in 1882. He was also a justice of the peace for both County Donegal and Monmouthshire. Style died at Folkestone in January 1904. Following his death he was succeeded as the 10th Baronet by his son, Sir Frederick Style. Frederick was one of eight children he had with Rosamond Marion Morgan, whom he had married in 1848.

Baronetage of England
Preceded by Sir Thomas Style	Baronet (of Wateringbury); 1879–1904	Succeeded by Sir Frederick Style
