= Assaye (battle honour) =

1803 British battle honour

Elephant emblem awarded to the Madras Sappers for Assaye

The Assaye battle honour was awarded by the Governor General of British India to all East India Company battalions and British Army regiments that took part of the Battle of Assaye. The battle occurred on 23 September 1803, near the village of Assaye in western India where a small force under the command of Major General Arthur Wellesley defeated a 50,000 strong army of the Maratha Confederacy. The British and native troops (which consisted of Madras Line only) were awarded the battle honour Assaye with the device of Elephant vide General Order of Governor General dated 30 October 1803. The British regiments and Madras battalions involved were also presented with an honorary colour to mark their achievement. The Madras Battalions celebrated the victory for over a century till their disbandment in the 1920s.

Of the sepoy battalions which faced the Maratha line, the only surviving battalion is the 1st Battalion, the Punjab Regiment of the Pakistan Army, the erstwhile 1st/1st Madras Infantry.

In the Indian Army only the Madras Sappers have this unique battle honour now but it counts as repugnant.

The Royal Highland Fusiliers which were formed on 20 January 1959 by an amalgamation of The Royal Scots Fusiliers and the Highland Light Infantry, are the descendant of the 74th (Highland) Regiment of Foot who first became The Highland Light Infantry in 1881, are the only British infantry regiment to still carry the battle honour.

The Light Dragoons, as the descendant of the 19th Light Dragoons, the only British cavalry regiment present, are the only British cavalry regiment to carry the battle honour. They became 19th PWO Hussars and used the Assaye Elephant as their cap badge.

== Recipients ==
The regiments and battalions which were awarded the battle honour were:

- Madras Pioneers - Presently the Madras Engineer Group
- 1st/2nd and 2nd/12th battalions Madras Infantry - their descendants being the 1st and 10th Battalions, the 1st Punjab Regiment which transferred to Pakistan on partition.
- 5th and 7th Madras Cavalry - Disbanded in 1860
- 1st/10th Madras Infantry (10th MI) - Disbanded in 1890
- 1st/8th Madras Infantry (8th MI) - Disbanded in 1902
- 1st/4th Madras Infantry - (2nd Bn Madras Pioneers) - Disbanded in 1933
- 74th (Highland) Regiment of Foot - Amalgamated with 71st (Highland) Regiment of Foot in 1881 forming the Highland Light Infantry
- 78th (Highlanders) Regiment of Foot - Amalgamated with 72nd Regiment of Foot in 1881 forming the 2nd Battalion of the Seaforth Highlanders
- 19th Light Dragoons - Disbanded in 1821
