= Henry Tubb =

English cricketer and pastoralist

Personal information
- Full name: Henry Tubb
- Born: 16 June 1851; Bicester, Oxfordshire, England
- Died: 8 February 1924 (aged 72); Chesterton, Oxfordshire, England
- Height: 5 ft 8 in (1.73 m)
- Batting: Right-handed
- Bowling: Right-arm roundarm medium
- Relatives: Sir William Style (brother-in-law); John Stratton (brother-in-law); Eustace Mordaunt (son-in-law)

Domestic team information
- Years: Team
- 1873–1877: Marylebone Cricket Club

Career statistics
Competition	First-class
Matches	5
Runs scored	93
Batting average	10.33
100s/50s	–/–
Top score	24
Balls bowled	48
Wickets	0
Bowling average	–
5 wickets in innings	–
10 wickets in match	–
Best bowling	–
Catches/stumpings	2/–
- Source: Cricinfo, 3 May 2021

Henry Tubb (16 June 1851 – 8 February 1924) was an English first-class cricketer and clergyman.

The son of Henry Michael Tubb, he was born at Bicester in February 1851 and was educated at Rugby School. A keen cricketer, Tubb played club cricket for Bicester Cricket Club. He played first-class cricket for the Marylebone Cricket Club between 1873 and 1877, making five appearances all against Oxford University at Oxford. Described by Scores and Biographies as a "good batsman" and a "middle-paced round-armed bowler", he scored 93 runs in his five first-class matches, with a highest score of 24, while going wicket-less with the ball. Tubb was dismissed caught in unusual fashion in a club match when he struck a ball into the air, which then hit a swift and fell into the hands of a fielder. A well known figure in Oxfordshire cricket, Tubb was a founding member of the original Oxfordshire County Cricket Club and presided over its second public meeting in March 1891 at the Clarendon Hotel, during which he was elected a vice-president of the county club. Outside of cricket, he worked in Bicester as a banker. Tubb died at Chesterton in February 1924, following a short illness; the month before his death he had been elected president of the Oxfordshire Agricultural Society.
