= William Style =

William Style (1603–1679), was a legal writer. He attended Queen's and Brasenose colleges, Oxford. He was a barrister at Inner Temple in 1628. He compiled Regestum Practicale 1657, and other works.

== Biography ==
Style was the second eldest son of William Style of Langley, Beckenham, Kent. Half brother of Sir Humphrey Style d.1659 and (grandson of Sir Humphrey Style, Esquire of the Body to Henry VIII), by his father's second wife, Mary, daughter of Sir Robert Clarke, was born in 1603. He matriculated at Oxford, from Queen's College, on 12 June 1618, and resided for a time at Brasenose College, but left the university without a degree.

Style was admitted in November 1618 a student at the Inner Temple, where he was called to the bar in 1628. After the death without surviving issue (1659) of his half-brother, Sir Humphrey Style, 1st Baronet, he resided on the ancestral estate of Langley. He died on 7 December 1679, and was buried at St. George in Beckenham, Kent, where he has a plaque inside the church. and is recorded in the parish register transcript, buried 12 December 1679, died 7 December. He may not have taken up residence of Langley, Beckenham until after 1671 and the death of Humphrey's wife Hester, The Lady Styells as she is described in her burial record although she had remarried John Scott of Hayes and Beckenham.

After William's death his eldest surviving son Humphrey 1648-1718 inherited Langley, Beckenham and Sympson's Place, Bromley. Other property was left to William's daughters, Mary and Hester.

== Works ==
Style translated from the Latin of John Michael Dilherr Contemplations, Sighes, and Groanes of a Christian, London, 1640, 12mo. He compiled:

1. Regestum Practicale, or the Practical Register, consisting of Rules, Orders, and Observations concerning the Common Laws and the practice thereof,’ London, 1657, 8vo, 3rd edit. 1694.
2. Narrationes Modernæ, or Modern Reports begun in the now Upper Bench Court at Westminster in the beginning of Hilary Term 21 Caroli, and continued to the end of Michaelmas Term, 1655, as well on the criminal as on the pleas side,’ London, 1658, fol.

He also edited, with additions, Glisson and Gulston's Common Law Epitomiz'd, London, 1679, 8vo. Style's Reports are the only published records of the decisions of Henry Rolle and Sir John Glynne.

== Family ==
Style married Elizabeth, daughter of William Duleing of Rochester. They had two sons:

- William, who died in his lifetime unmarried.
- Humphrey, b.1744, whose daughter Elizabeth inherited Langley for some unknown reason, rather than Humphrey himself..

And two daughters; Mary and Hester
