= Style baronets =

Baronetcy in the Baronetage of England

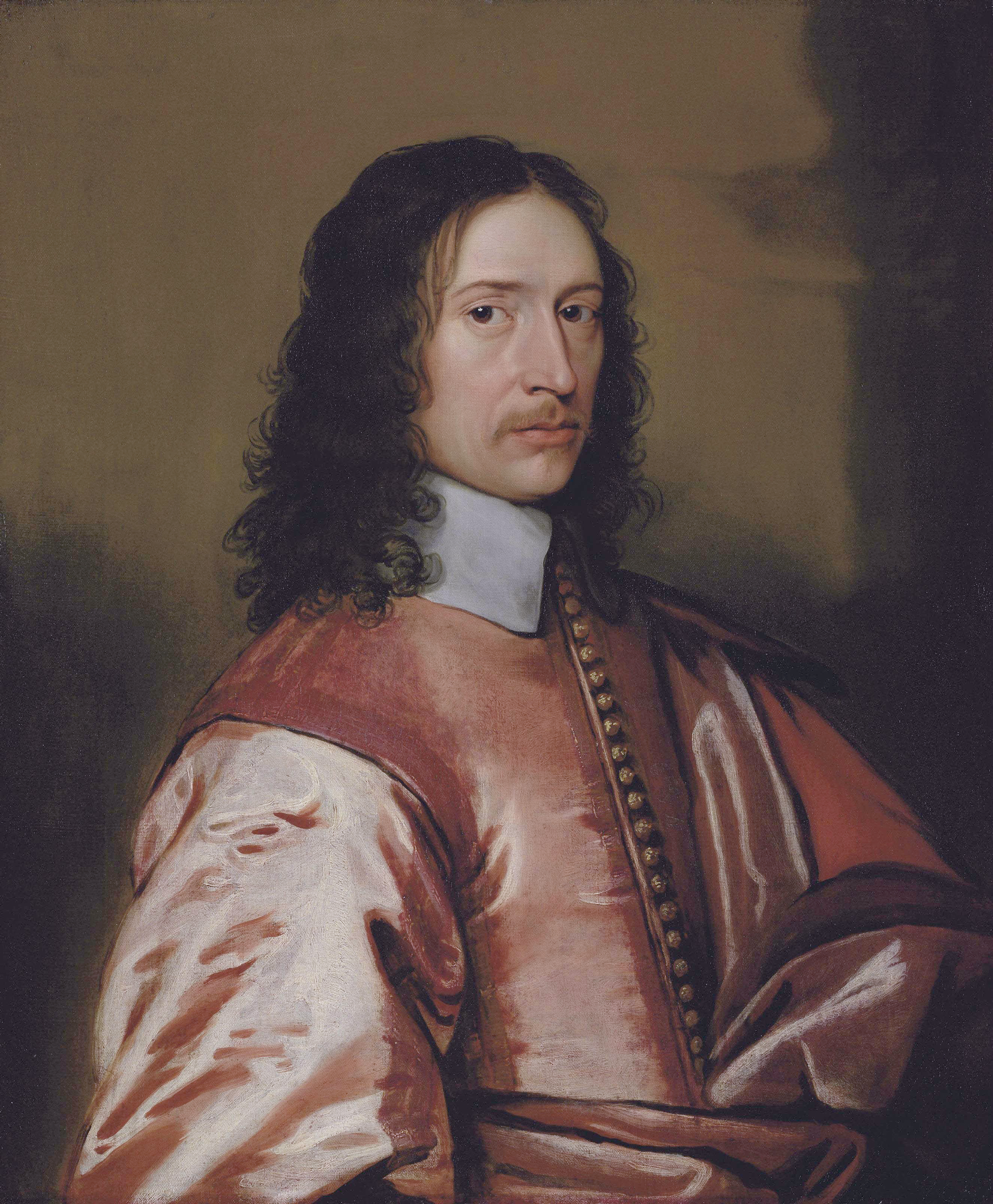
Sir Humphrey Style, 1st Baronet (Circle of Adriaen Hanneman)

There have been three baronetcies created for persons with the surname Style, one in the Baronetage of Ireland and two in the Baronetage of England. Two of the creations were in favour of the same person. As of 2014 one creation is extant.

The Style Baronetcy was created in the Baronetage of Ireland on 13 September 1624 for Humphry Style. He was made a baronet on May 20, 1627, in the English Baronetage, of Beckenham in the County of Kent. At the time of his death in 1659, both titles were lost.

The Style Baronetcy, of Wateringbury in the County of Kent, was created in the baronetage of England on 21 April 1627 for Thomas Style. He served as High Sheriff of Kent in 1634. The second baronet sat as member of parliament for Kent in 1659. The fourth baronet was high sheriff in 1710 and briefly represented Bramber in the House of Commons in 1715. The eighth baronet was member of parliament for Scarborough. Two other members of the family may also be mentioned. William Style, second son of Reverend Robert Style, second son of the fourth baronet, was a captain in the Royal Navy. Rodney Charles Style (1863–1957), fourth son of the ninth Baronet, was a brigadier-general in the British Army.

The family seat was Glenmore, near Stranorlar, County Donegal.

== Style baronets (1624) ==
Escutcheon of the Style baronets of Langley

- Sir Humphrey Style, 1st Baronet (c. 1596–1659)

== Style baronets, of Wateringbury (1627) ==
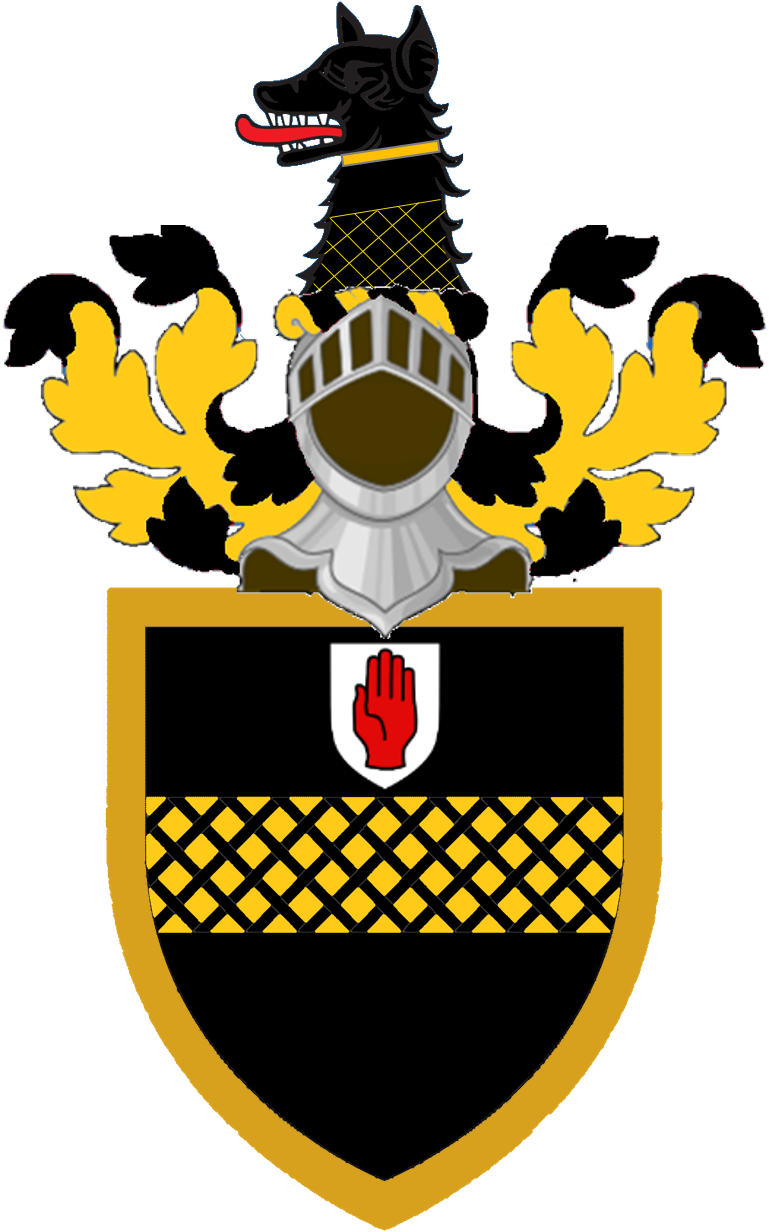
Arms: Sable a Fess Or fretty of the field between three Fleurs-de-lys of the second a Bordure Gold; Crest: A Wolf's Head couped Sable collared Or the lower part of the neck fretty of the last

- Sir Thomas Style, 1st Baronet (1587–1637)
- Sir Thomas Style, 2nd Baronet (1624–1702)
- Sir Oliver Style, 3rd Baronet (c. 1657–1703)
- Sir Thomas Style, 4th Baronet (died 1769)
- Sir Charles Style, 5th Baronet (died 1774)
- Sir Charles Style, 6th Baronet (died 1804)
- Sir Thomas Style, 7th Baronet (died 1813)
- Sir Thomas Charles Style, 8th Baronet (1797–1879)
- Sir William Henry Marsham Style, 9th Baronet (1826–1904)
- Sir Frederick Montague Style, 10th Baronet (1857–1930)
- Sir William Frederick Style, 11th Baronet (1887–1943)
- Sir William Montague Style, 12th Baronet (1916–1981)
- Sir William Frederick Style, 13th Baronet (born 1945)

The heir apparent is the present holder's only son (William) Colin Style (born 1995).

== Style baronets, of Beckenham (1627) ==
- see the 1624 creation above
