= Waugh Insurgency =

Insurgency in Northern Mysore

- Part of the British conquest of India
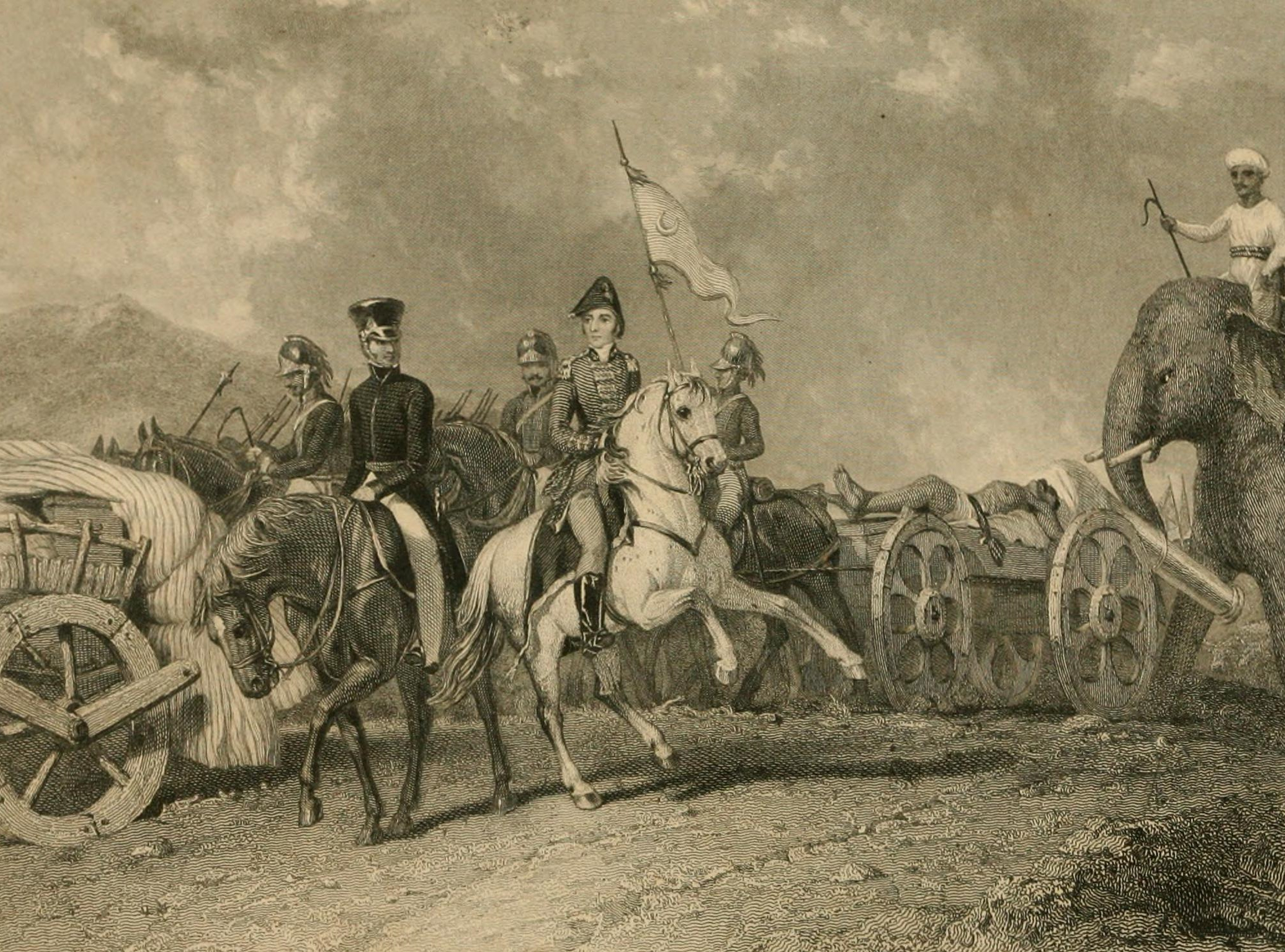
- 1917 illustration of the Battle of Conagul
Date	May – September 1800
Location	Karnataka, India
Result	British victory

Belligerents
Great Britain; East India Company	Dhoondiah Waugh

Commanders and leaders
Arthur Wellesley	Dhoondiah Waugh †

Strength
8,000	More than 50,000 (30,000 irregular light cavalry)

Casualties and losses
1,000–1,600 killed and wounded	3,750–7,000 killed or wounded

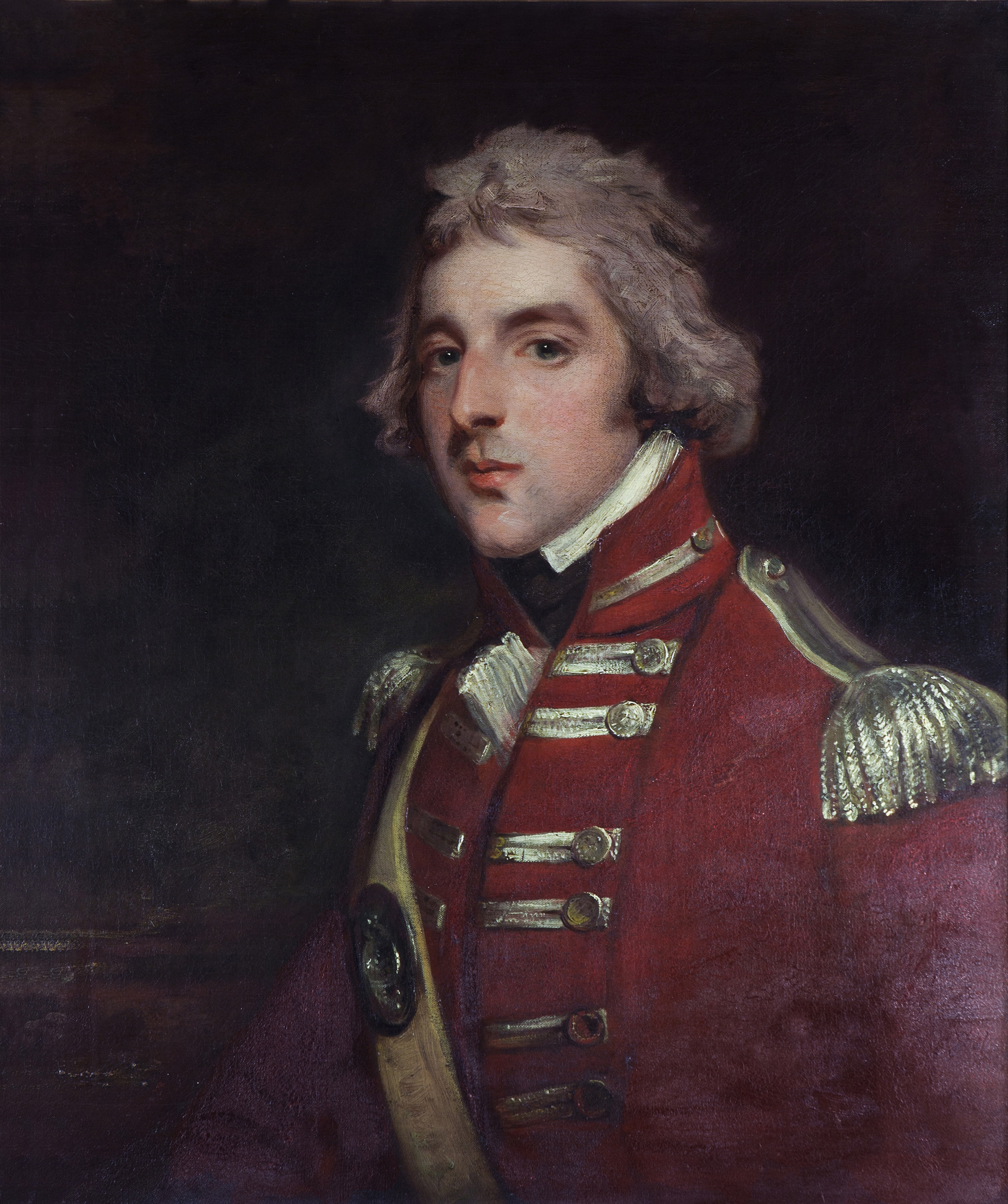
Portrait of Wellesley made five years before the insurgency

In 1800, whilst serving as Governor of Mysore, Wellesley was tasked with suppressing an insurgency led by Dhoondiah Waugh, formerly a soldier who had served under Tipu Sultan. After the fall of Seringapatam, Waugh had turned to brigandage, having raised a sizeable force composed of disbanded Mysorean soldiers, and raided villages along the Maratha–Mysore border. Waugh had also captured some British-held outposts and forts in Mysore, and was receiving the support of several Maratha killedars opposed to Company rule in India.

This drew the attention of the East India Company administration, and Wellesley was given independent command of a combined British Army and East India Company force. In June 1800, with an army of 8,000 infantry and cavalry, Wellesley moved against Waugh, having learned that Waugh's forces numbered over 50,000, although the majority (around 30,000) were irregular light cavalry and unlikely to pose a serious threat.

Throughout June–August 1800, Wellesley advanced through Waugh's territory, his troops escalading forts in turn and capturing each one with "trifling loss". Waugh continued to retreat, but his forces were rapidly deserting, he had no infantry and due to the monsoon weather flooding river crossings he could no longer outpace the British advance. On 10 September, at the Battle of Conaghul, Wellesley personally led a charge of 1,400 British dragoons and sepoy cavalry, in single line with no reserve, against Dhoondiah and his remaining 5,000 cavalry. Dhoondiah was killed in action during the charge, and his body was discovered and taken to the British camp tied to a cannon. With this victory Wellesley's campaign was concluded, as British authority had been restored.

== Background ==
Following the death of Tipu Sultan in May 1799, the British East India Company gained control over much of southern India. However, the northern districts of Mysore remained unstable. Among the most prominent threats was Dhoondiah Waugh, a former Mysorean cavalry officer who had converted to Islam and styled himself Malik Jahan Khan. After escaping imprisonment during the fall of Seringapatam, Waugh rallied a force of disbanded Mysorean soldiers, Maratha irregulars, and local insurgents. By early 1800, he had seized several forts and outposts, levied taxes, and declared himself Ubhaya-Lokadheeshwara (“King of Two Worlds”).

Alarmed by Waugh's growing influence which may result the risk of a broader uprising, the EIC appointed Arthur Wellesley–the governor of Mysore–to lead a campaign against him. On 26 May 1800, Wellesley wrote to his brother, Governor-General Marquess Wellesley, warning of the insurgency's potential to ignite widespread rebellion:

If we do not get him, we must expect a general insurrection of all the discontented and disaffected of these countries. I have information that letters have been received by most of them, either from him, or from others written in his name, calling upon them to take the opportunity to rebel against the Company's government, or that of their allies; and his invasion of our territory is looked to as a circumstance favorable to their views. The destruction of this man, therefore, is absolutely necessary for our tranquillity.

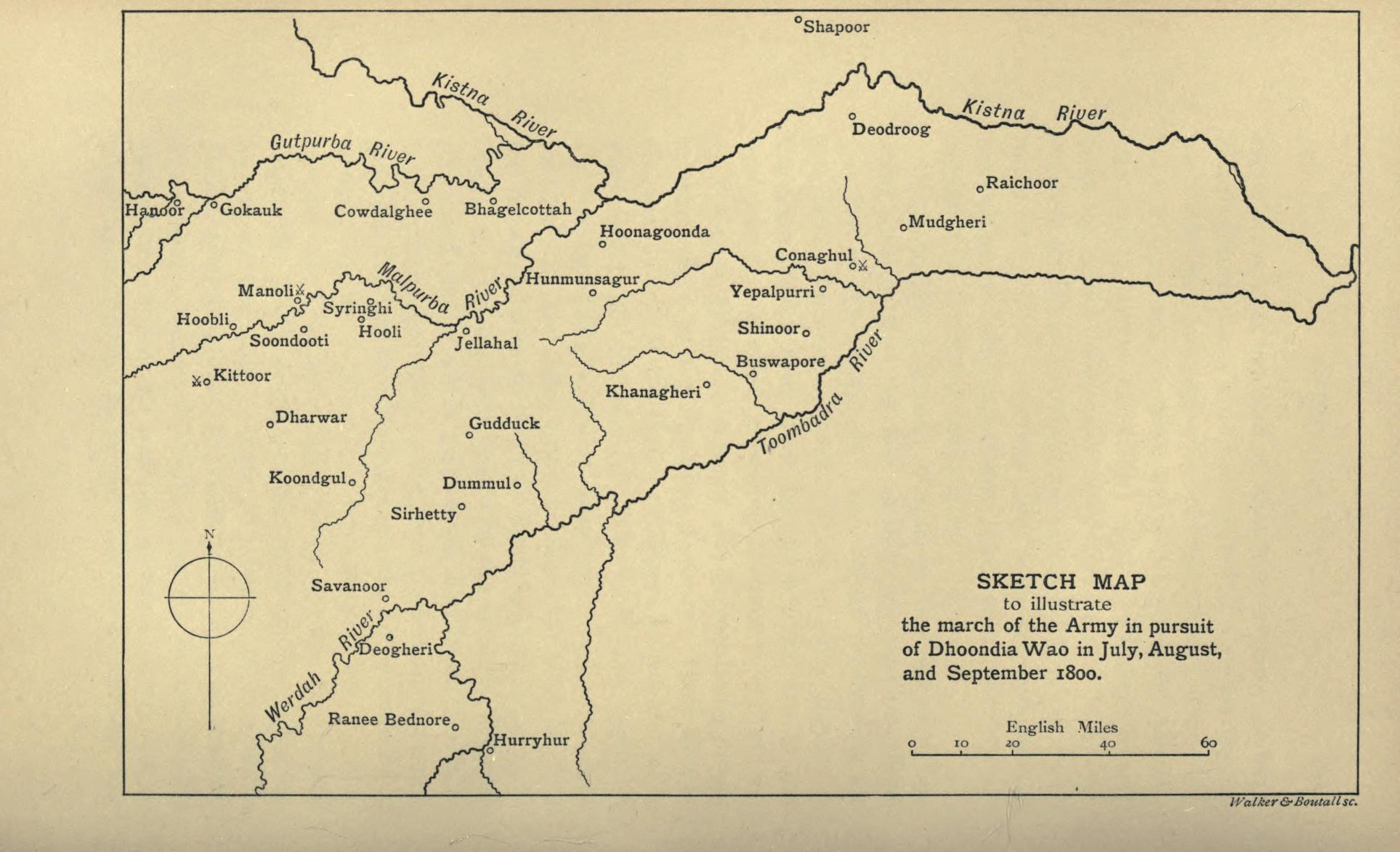
Map to illustrate the march of the British Army in pursuit of Dhondia Wagh in July, August and September 1800

== Campaign ==
=== Wellesley's Troops ===
Wellesley's infantry consisted of two European battalions including 216 men of the British Army's Regiment de Meuron and five sepoy battalions. His cavalry, under the command of Colonel Stevenson, comprised three European regiments including the 19th Light Dragoons and 2 sepoy regiments. Approximately 8,000 troops British and Indian troops served in the suppression of the insurgency.

=== Suppression ===
In June 1800, Colonel(acting Major General) Arthur Wellesley assembled a retaliation force at Chitradurga, comprising the 25th Light Dragoons, 73rd Foot, 77th Foot, and native infantry and cavalry units. As the British advanced, Dhoondiah Waugh retreated into Maratha-controlled territory, believing that Wellesley would seek permission from the peshwa of the Mahrattas to continue the pursuit. The Peshwa not only granted the permission but also dispatched a Mahratta contingent under Chintamanrao Patwardhan to assist the Company in the campaign. Wellesley reached Harihar on 16 June, though Waugh fled to Hubli by 19 June. On 20 June, British forces captured Airani Fort, followed by Ranibennur Fort within the week. These strongholds were handed over to Patwardhan in recognition of his support. On 27 June, the British stormed Bidnur Fort, though Waugh remained elusive.

While all this was happening, Dhondopant Gokhale (Senior Commander of peshwa's force), accompanied by his nephews Appaji Ganeshand Bapuji Ganesh, joined Patwardhan's Maratha force. On 30 June, they fought Waugh at Dawangi Nala near Kittur. In a brutal ambush at Londa, Waugh killed Gokhale and Appaji Ganesh. Patwardhan launched a counterattack but was severely wounded and forced to seek refuge in the British-held fort at Haliyal, along with Bapuji and other Maratha survivors.

On 4 July, Wellesley wrote to Patwardhan, for his bravery and inviting him to formally join British operations. The campaign continued with the capture of Savanur on 12 July, though progress was hampered by monsoon conditions. Waugh, meanwhile, moved toward Kittur, then retreated to Kundgol, leaving 600 men behind and reaching Annigeri via Kanavi on 17 July. On 25 July, Wellesley met Patwardhan to coordinate a joint offensive operation. The following day, their combined forces seized Dambal Fort, defended by 1,000 of Waugh's men. Despite these setbacks, Waugh continued to evade capture, moving through Saundatti, Annigeri, Munavalli, Kittur, Khanapur, and Badami.

By the end of July, Wellesley had reclaimed most of Waugh's former territory. As desertions thinned his ranks, Waugh fled toward Nizam-controlled lands.On 30 July, British forces launched a surprise attack on Waugh's column as it crossed the Malaprabha River at Manoh, but he escaped. Wellesley then split his army into three columns, supported by Maratha and Nizam contingents, to maintain pressure. Skirmishes continued throughout August.On 25 August, Waugh again crossed the Malaprabha. On 9 September, Stevenson's detachment engaged Waugh's column, and effectively halted his advance. The next morning, 10 September 1800, Waugh was killed in a cavalry charge near Conagul by Wellesley's 19th Light Dragoons.

Wellesley later offered protection to Waugh's four-year-old son, Salabat Khan, funding his care before departing for Europe. Salabat Khan was later employed by the King of Mysore and died of cholera in 1822.

== Aftermath ==
The death of Dhoondiah Waugh at the Battle of Conagul ended post-Tipu rebellion in northern Mysore. The British East India Company reasserted control over northern Mysore, integrating previously contested forts and districts.The campaign strengthened diplomatic ties with the Maratha Peshwa and the Nizam of Hyderabad, both of whom had supported the company. The suppression of Waugh's rebellion discouraged any other uprisings and stabilized the borders between Mysore and Maratha empires.

== See also ==
- Dhondia Wagh
- Arthur Wellesley, 1st Duke of Wellington
- Maratha–Mysore wars
