= Sir Humphrey Style, 1st Baronet =

English baronet

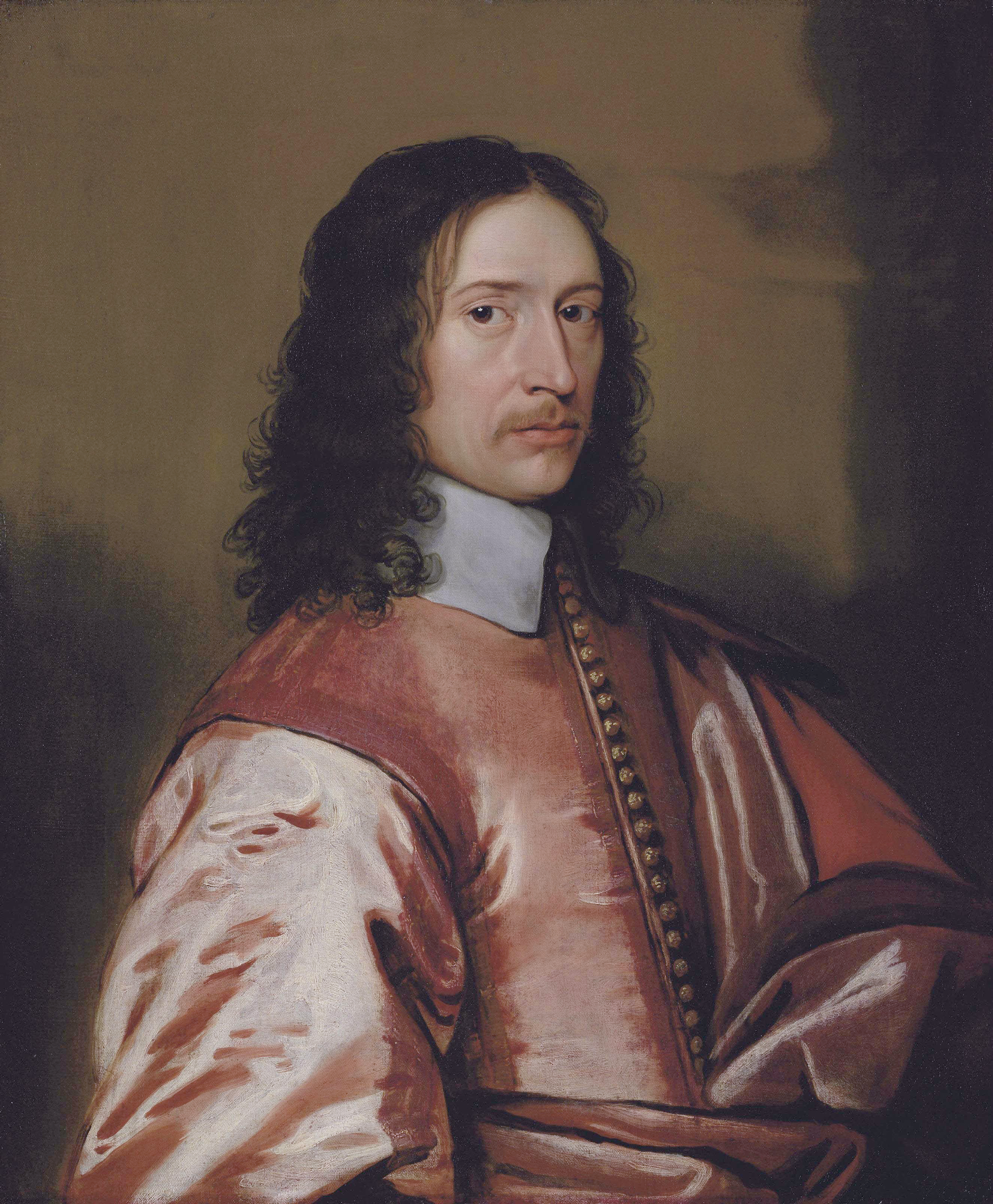
Humphrey Style, 1st Baronet (Circle of Adriaen Hanneman)

Sir Humphrey Style, 1st Baronet (c. 1596–1659) of Beckenham, Kent was a courtier to kings James I and Charles I of England.

== Biography ==
Humphrey was the son of William Style of Langley, Beckenham, Kent (grandson of Sir Humphrey Style, Esquire of the Body to Henry VIII). He was a Gentleman of the Privy Chamber to James I and cup-bearer to Charles I. He was a colonel of the trained bands of horse (cavalry) in Kent.

Sir Humphrey was knighted at Farnham by King James on 11 August 1622 and under that designation created a baronet of Ireland on 13 September 1624. Charles I created him a baronet of England on 20 May 1627.

Sir Humphrey died on 10 November 1659 in his 64th year and was buried at Beckenham. As he died without any surviving children, the baronetcy became extinct. (Note: The present baronet, Sir William Frederick Style, 13th Baronet, is descended from Sir Humphrey Style's second son, Oliver, and thus represents a younger branch of the family (Rigg 1898, p. 140).) The Langley estate passed to his half-brother, William Style who resided there until his death in 1679.

== Family ==
Sir Humphrey married Elizabeth, widow of Sir Robert Bosvile, of Eynesford, daughter and heiress of Robert Peshall, or Peeshall, of Eccleshall, Staffordshire, and of Lincoln's Inn, London. Elizabeth was buried 27 Nov 1641 at the Style vault in St. George's, Beckenham. His second wife was Hester Wright daughter of Robert Wright Lord Bishop of Coventry & Lichfield & his wife Bridget (confirmed by Abstracts of Probate Acts in the Prerogative of Canterbury Vol iv 1646). There was one child named Charles who only survived for less than 1 month, baptised 23 January 1654 and buried 6 February 1654. After Humphrey's death Hester married John Scott of Hayes, Kent (c.1626–1670), a Gentleman of the Privy Chamber. Hester and John Scott appear to have occupied Langley, Beckenham until Hester's death in 1671 and she was buried as The Lady Styells at St. George's, Beckenham. In 1632 Humphrey's cousin Sir Thomas Style of Wateringbury was high sheriff of Kent and Humphrey wrote a letter to his then wife Elizabeth Bosvile describing preparations for a perambulation of Kent.

== Notes ==
Baronetage of Ireland
New creation	Baronet (of Rumbelows); 1624–1659	Extinct
Baronetage of England
New creation	Baronet (of Beckanham); 1627–1659	Extinct
