= Battle of Sultanpet Tope =

1799 battle of the Fourth Anglo-Mysore War

- Part of the Fourth Anglo-Mysore War
| Date | 5–6 April 1799 |
| Location | Sultanpet Tope |
| Result | British victory |

Belligerents
| Mysore | British East India Company |

Commanders and leaders
| Tipu Sultan | Arthur Wellesley (WIA) |

The Battle of Sultanpet Tope was a small action fought on 5 and 6 April 1799 between forces of the British East India Company and the Kingdom of Mysore during the Fourth Anglo-Mysore War. Although initially checked, it was a British victory.

== Prelude ==
On 3 April, the British force reached the position next to Seringapatam in which General Abercromby had encamped in 1792, on the south-west side of the island and prepared to besiege the place.

During the time which had intervened since Lord Cornwallis's siege of Seringapatam (1792), the Sultan had given great attention to strengthening the fortifications. But, excepting a battery which he had erected on the north-west angle of the fort, his improvements had been mainly directed to the south and east sides.

The works on the west side where the wall overlooks the Káveri were not so strong, although even here they were protected by a double wall and a ditch. In front of the British army was broken rising ground intersected by deep ditches, with some deserted villages, and several topes (groves) of areca-nut palms and cocoa trees, which afforded a safe cover to Tipu's skirmishers and rocket-men. An aqueduct within 1,700 yards (1,600 m) of the fortress, near a wooded tope called the Sultanpet Tope or "Sultaunpet", afforded Tippoo's skirmishers and rocketmen firing rocket artillery a safe cover from which they most seriously annoyed the British outposts.

General Baird was directed to scour this grove and dislodge the enemy, but on his advance with this object on the night of 4/5 April, he found the tope unoccupied.

== Battle ==
During the day, the Mysore troops reoccupied the position, and as it was absolutely necessary to expel them, two columns were detached at sunset on 5 April for the purpose. The first of these columns, under Colonel Shawe, took possession of a ruined village, which it successfully held. The second column, under Colonel Wellesley, on advancing into the tope, was at once attacked in the darkness of night by a tremendous fire of musketry and rockets. The men, floundering about amidst the trees and the water-courses, at last broke, and fell back in disorder, some being killed and a few taken prisoner. In the confusion, Colonel Wellesley was struck on the knee by a spent ball, and narrowly escaped being captured by the enemy.

The second attack with four regiments, also under the command of Wellesley, succeeded in taking possession of the grove on the morning of 6 April. This allowed British forces to advance within 1,800 yards (1,600 m) of Seringapatam, and General Harris was able to proceed with his siege-operations, the army taking up its final position on 7 April.

== Aftermath ==
The military historian Richard Holmes made the point that:

The bitter humiliation of the [failed night attack] taught Wellesley two lessons he would never forget. The first was a military lesson of the importance of reconnaissance before attack and the second an emotional lesson about the bitterness of defeat. All in all he was lucky to get away with it. Had his brother not been Governor General, Wellesley might have found himself facing a court martial...

— Richard Holmes
