= Kanavi =

- Village
- Location within Karnataka Location within India
- Coordinates: 15°18′48″N 75°34′6″E
- Country: India
- State: Karnataka
- District: Gadag district

Languages
  - Official: Kannada
- Time zone: UTC+5:30 (IST)
- Vehicle registration: KA-26

Kanavi is a village in the Gadag district of Karnataka State in India.

== Demographics ==
Per the 2011 Census of India, Kanavi has a total population of 3132; of whom 1623 are male and 1509 female.

== Transport ==
The nearest railway station is in Gadag.

== See also ==
- Lakkundi
- Dambal
- Lakshmeshwar
- Gadag
