= Havanur =

- village
- Location in Karnataka, India Havanur (India)
- Coordinates: 14°52′N 75°42′E
- Country: India
- State: Karnataka
- District: Haveri
- Talukas: Haveri

Population (2015)
  - Total: 10,101

Languages
  - Official: Kannada
- Time zone: UTC+5:30 (IST)
- PIN: 581108
- Vehicle registration: KA 27
- Nearest city: Haveri & Ranebennur
- Literacy: about 60%%
- Lok Sabha constituency: Haveri
- Vidhan Sabha constituency: Haveri
- Climate: Stable (Köppen)

Havanur is a village in the southern state of Karnataka, India. It is located in the Haveri taluk of Haveri district in North Karnataka.

== Demographics ==
As of 2001 India census, Havanur had a population of 7306 with 3767 males and 3539 females. The Adishakti Temple in the village is very famous in Haveri district and Tungabhadra river flows in the village. Once in every year the Adishakti fair takes place; a very famous fair in the Haveri district. From the 'Purana's' many snakes found in this place from that onwards this place is called as Havanur. Or it may also be Havanada Ooru (Place of Sacrifice, Havana in Sanskrit) this is the famous place for Adishakti temple.(Dymavva devi). It is a fact that Devi's idol arrived in a box along with a golden threaded saree some 150 plus years back. Devi is a Goddess of vast mystical powers. Her idol is placed only one day a year in open pedestal and people have tried in vain to capture a photograph, which is known not to appear in image. Havanur also has a temple of Mhalasa Martand Bhairava, affectionately called 'Yelu Koti' (Severn Crore as translated). Martand Bhairava is worshipped by range of castes including Muslims. In a fair held during January, a monk (called Gorappa) after a fast of eight days climbs a wooden mast with iron rod (called Bow of God) held by men surrounded by sheep wool blankets. He looks around and yells a prophecy for a year's cropping pattern mostly and falls down. The ambiance of tranquility that sets just before the prophecy is watch worthy and mystifying.

Personalities of Reverence hail from this village: L G Havanur, the Architect of Constitution of South Africa hails from this village. With humble beginnings from a valmiki family, he rose to a persona of high knowledge, erudition and leadership as a practitioner of law. Bengaluru has a lane dedicated to his name. Dr. Srinivas Havanur, a well-known scholar in Kannada literature, who became Head of the Department of Kannada in Mangalore and Mumbai Universities also hails from Havanur. Many more eminent professionals are connected to this village as first or second generation descendants.

Havanur was also a major focal point during the movement in response to pollution of the river as inflicted by nearby polyfibre manufacturing. Still, the mill owned by a leading industrialist pollutes river often and people are at receiving end. Residents have experienced many ill effects on skin and other body systems due to the pollutant load that dominates during low water flow periods. Apart from this, another major environmental issue that dominated this village is the sand mining. Well known for its high quality, sand banks of Tungabhadra were rampantly exploited by unscrupulous sand suppliers during the late 1990s. In Google Images, one can clearly see the broken banks of the river due to indiscriminate and unscientific mining. A blue van of police full of service weapons some time can be spotted some time in the village after the strict enforcement of vigilance by judiciary of the state against sand mining.

== See also ==
- Haveri
- Districts of Karnataka
