= 19th Light Dragoons =

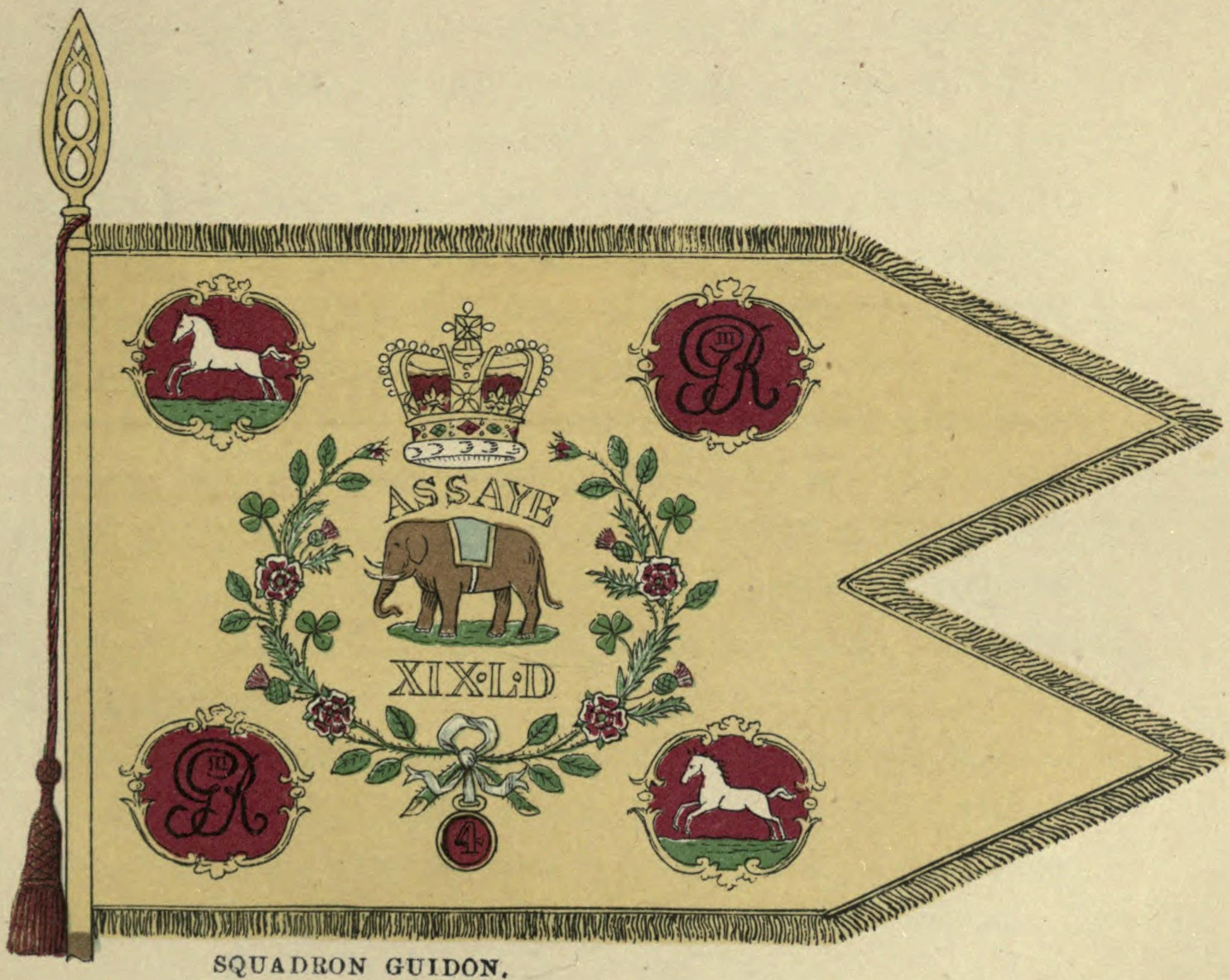
- A regimental squadron guidon
- Active: 1781–1821
- Country: Great Britain; United Kingdom
- Branch: British Army
- Type: Light cavalry
- Role: Dragoons
- Size: Regiment
- Engagements: Third Anglo-Mysore War; Fourth Anglo-Mysore War; Waugh Insurgency; Second Anglo-Maratha War; Vellore Mutiny; War of 1812
- Battle honours: Seringapatam; Assaye; Niagara

The 19th Light Dragoons was a light cavalry regiment of the British Army. It was first raised in England as the 19th Regiment of (Light) Dragoons in 1779 as part of three light dragoon regiments raised to defend Britain against French attacks during the American War of Independence. Consisting of troops from other cavalry regiments, the regiment saw no service before being disbanded in 1783.

Colonel Sir John Burgoyne raised the 23rd Regiment of (Light) Dragoons in 1781 for service in British India. The regiment arrived in India in 1782 and was renumbered as the "19th Regiment of (Light) Dragoons" in 1786, seeing action in the Third Anglo-Mysore War, Fourth Anglo-Mysore War and Second Anglo-Maratha War along with the suppression of the Waugh Insurgency and Vellore Mutiny.

The regiment returned to England in 1806 before being transferred to Canada in 1813, seeing action in the War of 1812. Returning to England again in 1816, the regiment was converted into a lancer unit in the same year and renamed the 19th Regiment of (Light) Dragoons (Lancers). The regiment remained in England until being disbanded in 1821.

== History ==
=== First incarnation ===
On 25 April 1779 the Crown issued royal warrants ordering the British Army to raise three light cavalry regiments to defend Britain against possible French attacks as part of the American War of Independence. These warrants resulted in the raising of the 19th, 20th and 21st Regiments of (Light) Dragoons. The 19th Regiment of (Light) Dragoons comprised personnel detached from the 1st and 2nd Dragoon Guards along with the 4th and 10th Dragoons. Remaining in England for the entirety of its existence, the new regiment saw no service before being disbanded in June 1783.

=== Second incarnation ===
==== Indian service ====
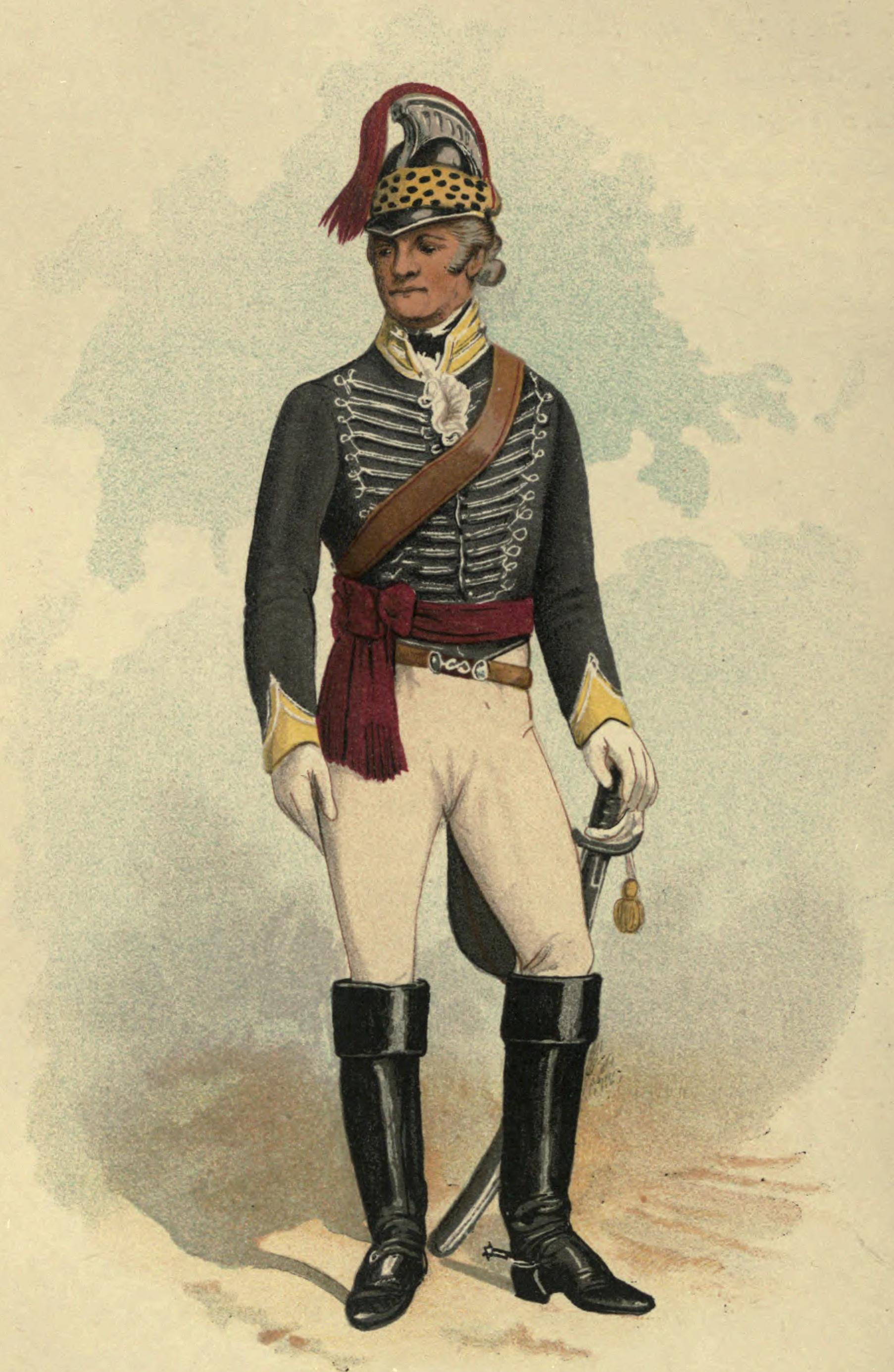
A regimental officer in 1792

On 24 September 1781 the 23rd Regiment of (Light) Dragoons was raised by Colonel Sir John Burgoyne (a cousin of Lieutenant-general John Burgoyne) for service in British India. The British Army had up until that point never sent a cavalry regiment to India, and successive British commanders in the Indian subcontinent had requested such a regiment be sent. The regiment arrived at Fort St. George in Madras in 1782. In 1786 the regiment was renumbered as the 19th Regiment of (Light) Dragoons, something made possible by the disbandment of the original regiment in 1783.

The regiment served in the Third Anglo-Mysore War, which broke out in 1789. From 1790 to 1792 the regiment fought against the army of the Kingdom of Mysore, which was led by Tipu Sultan. Following the British victory in the war in 1792 the regiment served on garrison duty until 1798 when the Fourth Anglo-Mysore War broke out. The regiment served in that war, including at the decisive British victory at the siege of Seringapatam in May 1799. Tipu was killed at the siege, which resulted in the dissolution of the Kingdom of Mysore.

In 1800 the regiment participated in the suppression of the Waugh Insurgency and later served in the Second Anglo-Mysore War when it broke out in 1803. The regiment fought in the Battle of Assaye on 23 September 1803 and was subsequently awarded the "Assaye" battle honour and presented with an honorary colour. The regiment garrisoned Cheyloor in 1802, Arcot in 1803, Bombay in 1804 and Arcot again from 1805 to 1806. On 10 July 1806 the regiment was sent to Vellore and assisted the 69th Regiment of Foot and other units in putting down the Vellore Mutiny by mutinous sepoys of the Madras Army.

==== North American service ====
The regiment embarked for England on 20 October 1806 and remained in Britain until the outbreak of the War of 1812 with the United States in June 1812. In 1813 three regimental squadrons were sent to Canada, with all three arriving at Quebec City in May 1813 without their horses; the squadrons were mounted on horses procured in Lower Canada. The regiment would prove to be one of only three British Army cavalry regiments which served in the War of 1812, and the only one that was stationed in Canada during the war. (The 14th Light Dragoons served in the Battle of New Orleans without their horses while the 6th Dragoons served in the Chesapeake campaign.)

Two of the three regimental squadrons were sent to Upper Canada, where they participated in the British recapture of Fort George in December 1813. Elements of the two squadrons participated in Colonel Thomas Pearson's delaying action against an American brigade under Brigadier General Winfield Scott on 4 July 1814. On the following day both squadrons fought at the Battle of Chippawa before being present at the Battle of Lundy's Lane on 25 July and the siege of Fort Erie in August. A regimental troop pursued American raiders following their attack on Malcolm's Mills on 6 November 1814. For these actions the regiment earned the "Niagara" battle honour.

The regiment's other squadron in Canada was stationed south of Montreal at several different locations, including in blockhouses along the Canada–United States border next to New York state. In September 1814 the squadron participated in the Battle of Plattsburgh and shortly afterwards the other two regimental squadrons serving in Canada rejoined the third squadron. The three squadrons were subsequently stationed south of Montreal until the end of the war in 1815. All three squadrons were sent back to England in August 1816.

==== Conversion to lancers and disbandment ====
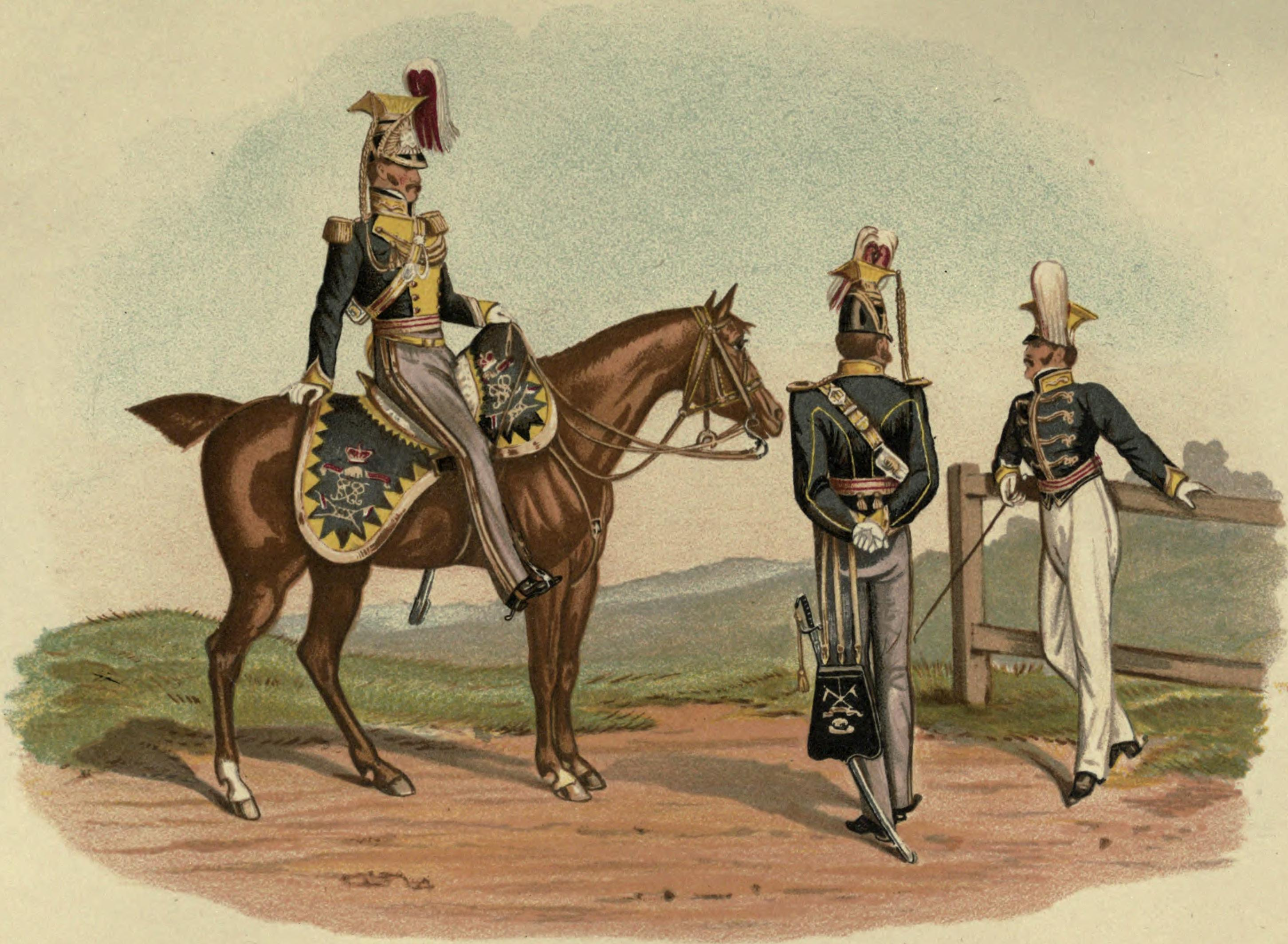
Regimental officers in 1818

In September 1816 the regiment was converted into a lancer unit and renamed the 19th Regiment of (Light) Dragoons (Lancers). The regiment remained in Britain until it was disbanded on 10 September 1821 due to the British Army undergoing a reduction in size. In 1862 the 19th Hussars was raised and given permission to inherit the battle honours of the 19th Light Dragoons.

== Regimental colonels ==
Colonels of the regiment were the following:

23rd Regiment of (Light) Dragoons (1781)

- 1781–1785: Sir John Burgoyne, Bt.

19th Regiment of (Light) Dragoons (1786)

- 1786–1814: Gen. Sir William Howe, 5th Viscount Howe, KB
- 1814–1815: Gen. Sir William Payne, Bt.

19th Regiment of (Light) Dragoons (Lancers) (1816)

- 1815–1821: Gen. Sir John Ormsby Vandeleur, GCB
- 1821: Regiment disbanded
