= Maratha invasions of Bengal =

Maratha invasions in Bengal (1742–1751)

- Part of the decline of the Mughal Empire
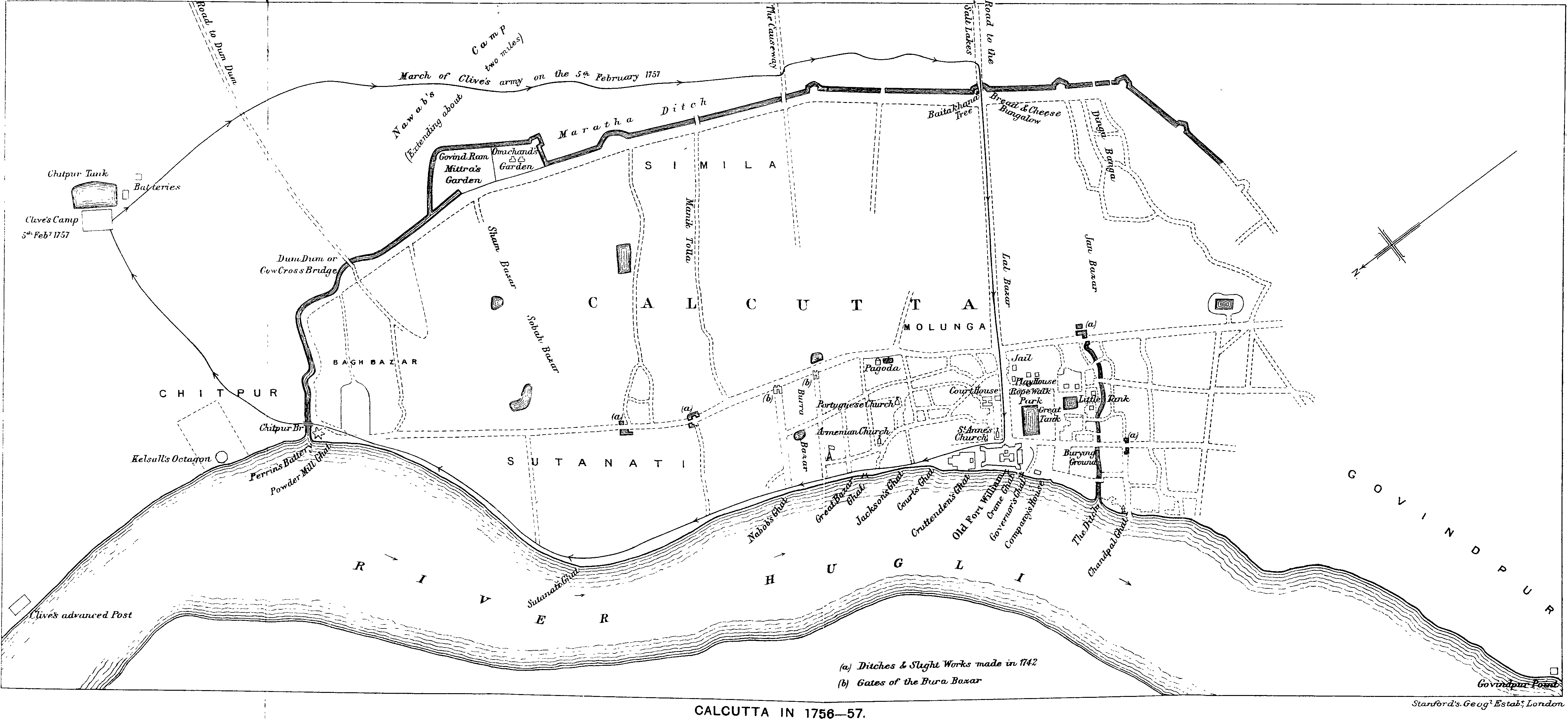
- A Maratha Ditch, constricted around forts and factories as protection against Maratha raids
Date	April 1742 – March 1751
Location	Bengal Subah (Bengal, Bihar, parts of modern Orissa)
Result	See Aftermath
Territorial changes	Territories south of Subarnarekha river ceded into the Nagpur State

Belligerents
Maratha Empire; Kingdom of Nagpur; Supported by: Afghan rebels	Bengal Subah; Supported by: Peshwa

Commanders and leaders
Raghuji I Commanders: Janoji Bhonsle; Sabaji Bhonsle; Mir Habib (from 1742); Bhaskar Ram Kolhatkar X; Alibhai Qarawwal X; Shahamat Khan X; Buland Khan Ruhela; Sarandaz Khan †; Sayyid Nur (POW); Dharmadas Hazari (POW); Mohan Singh; Raghuji Gaikwad; Shesh Rao; Afghan rebels: Mustafa Khan (WIA) (from 1748); Abdul Rasul Khan (from 1745) †	Alivardi Khan Commanders: Abdul Ali Khan; Abdus Subhan Khan (POW); Ali Quli Khan; Ataullah Khan; Bar Khordar Beg; Chitrasen Rai; Dost Muhammad Khan; Durlabh Ram; Fakhrullah Beg Khan; Haidar Ali Khan; Mahdi Nisar Khan; Mir Abdul Aziz; Mir Habib; Mir Jafar; Mir Kazim Khan; Mir Khairullah Khan; Mirza Beg Khan; Mirza Dawar Quli; Mirza Hakim Beg; Muhammad Raza (POW); Musahib Khan †; Mustafa Khan (Until 1745); Raham Khan; Saif Khan; Sardar Khan (Until 1748); Saulat Jang; Shaikh Masum Khan †; Shamshir Khan (Until 1748); Siraj-ud-Daulah (AWOL); Umar Khan; Zain ud-Din Ahmed Khan; Balaji Baji Rao; Pilaji Jadav; Malhar Holkar

Strength
First invasion: 10,000 or 12,000 or 20,000 cavalry Second invasion: 50,000 cavalry or 75,000 Third invasion: 20,000 cavalry Fourth invasion: Barabati: 14,000 or 20,000 cavalry 25,000 infantry 300 guns Naubatpur: 12,000; Bhagalpur: 5,000–6,000; Cuttack: 8,000 cavalry 20,000 infantry Fifth invasion: Bihar: 5,000 cavalry 7,000 infantry Cuttack: 7,000–8,000; Balasore: 40,000 (Note: Allied with Afghan rebels); Midnapore: 12,000 cavalry	First invasion: 23,000–26,000 Second invasion: 70,000 cavalry 100,000 musketeers Third invasion: Unknown Fourth invasion: Barabati: 400; Naubatpur: 14,000 or 20,000; Bhagalpur: 600; Cuttack: 7,000–8,000 cavalry 12,000 infantry Fifth invasion: Burdwan: 8,000; Midnapore: 5,000–6,000 cavalry

Casualties and losses
- Dutch East India Company factory in Bengal and Bihar, estimated that 400,000 civilians in Western Bengal and Bihar died in the overall conflict. (approx. 1.4% of Bengal's population killed.)

The Maratha invasions of Bengal (1742–1751), were a series of raids by the Maratha forces in the Bengal Subah (Bengal, Bihar, and parts of modern Orissa) after the successful campaign in the Carnatic region at the Battle of Trichinopoly. The campaigns were carried out under Raghuji I of Nagpur to impose Chauth. Between April 1742 to March 1751, the Marathas invaded Bengal five times in 1742, 1743, 1744, 1745 and 1748 respectively, causing widespread economic losses in the Bengal Subah.

In the early 18th century, the newly-risen Maratha Empire from modern Maharashtra inflicted a series of defeats over the Mughals, capturing several provinces formerly belonging to the Mughal Empire. It was during this period they reached at the de facto independent Bengal Subah, particularly Orissa. Marathas conducted raids within Bengal and plundered cities and villages and caused widespread devastation. After devastating conflicts both sides sued for peace which resulted in the Nawab of Bengal agreeing to cede Orissa to the Maratha Empire and to pay an annual tribute in exchange for not being raided again.

== Background ==
The Maratha invasions of Bengal were driven by Maratha imperialism, aiming to dismantle the declining Mughal Empire. Initiated by Peshwa Baji Rao I, the Marathas sought to expand their dominance, with Raghuji Bhonsle targeting Bengal for its wealth and to extract tribute. Political instability in Bengal, coupled with invitations from ousted Nawab Sarfaraz’s (r. 1739–1740) allies, prompted Raghuji to invade.

Contemporary Bengali works like Bhratachandra's Annadāmangala portray the invasions as Hindu resistance against Muslim oppression. He presented the Bargis as agents of Shiva. Bhratachandra's narrative could be biased as he was the court poet of the zamindar of Krishnanagar who had been imprisoned by the Nawab of Bengal after failing to pay tribute. (Note: Kalikinkar Datta asserts that Bharatachandra may be biased since he was court-poet of the Zamindar Krishnachandra who often had hostilities with Nawab. While Gangarama does not, however, stand on the same footing. His account is obviously one from the standpoint of the masses of the people. (Datta 1939, p. 58)) Another contemporary Hindu poet, Gangarama, wrote the Mahārāṣtrapurāṇa, which suggests initial public hope in Maratha intervention, followed by disappointment and eventual support for Bengal's Muslim government. The atrocities committed by the Marathas against Bengali Hindus chilled initial perceptions of the Marathas as Hindu liberators.

Lastly, seeking revenge against Alivardi Khan, the relatives and partisans of the former Nawab Sarfaraz Khan invited Raghuji to invade Alivardi's dominions. The Riyaz-us-Salatin asserts that Mir Habib went to invite the Marathas following the defeat of Murshid Quli II in the Battle of Phulwari. The Siyar al-Mutaqherin by Ghulam Hussain Khan, however, claims that Mir Habib was captured by the Marathas while engaged in fighting at Katwa.

== Invasions of Bengal ==
=== First invasion (1742) ===
In 1742, Bengal experienced its initial encounter with the Maratha invasion. In April, Maratha forces under Bhaskar Ram sent by Raghuji Bhonsle to collect chauth (tribute), invaded Bengal via Odisha. They advanced unopposed through Odisha and Panchet, near modern Raniganj, reaching near Burdwan. Nawab Alivardi Khan rushed to Burdwan on 15 April but faced constant Maratha skirmishes and plundering, causing severe food shortages. He broke through to Katwa amid heavy losses and hardships. At Katwa, the Marathas had already plundered and burned granaries. A Maratha detachment under Mir Habib who had defected now with the Marathas, raided Nawab's capital Murshidabad in early May. Alivardi hurried back, arriving on 7 May; the Marathas retreated to Katwa, looting villages en route. As rains approached, the Marathas considered withdrawing, but Mir Habib convinced them to stay. They captured Hooghly, installed Shesh Rao as governor, and used Katwa as headquarters, aiming to expand beyond the Hooghly River toward Dhaka. During the 1742 rainy season, fighting paused, but Marathas ravaged Burdwan, Murshidabad, Nadia, Birbhum, Midnapore, Santal Parganas, and Odisha up to Balasore, committing atrocities. Gangaram wrote in his poems that the people fled with belongings, only to be robbed, mutilated, or killed; women were abducted and raped, villages burned. Many Bengalis migrated eastward for safety. Alivardi used the lull to regroup at camps near Murshidabad, reinforced by nephew the Naib Nazim of Bihar Zain-ud-Din Ahmed Khan and Saif Khan from Purnia. In late September 1742, he launched a surprise attack on Bhaskar Ram's camp at Katwa routing the Marathas. They fled across the Bhagirathi and Ajay rivers; Alivardi pursued through Panchet, Bankura, Midnapore, and Odisha, driving them beyond Chilika Lake by December. En route, Marathas plundered towns and killed Odisha's deputy governor Shaikh Masum at Jaipur. Alivardi appointed Abdul Nabi Khan as replacement and returned to Murshidabad on 10 February 1743 after two months in Odisha.

Alivardi Khan successfully repelled the invasion, although not without the unfortunate consequence of Murshidabad and Hooghly suffering from plundering.

=== Second invasion (1743) ===
Raghuji I lead the Marathas and attacked and captured Katwa and Hooghly in Bengal. Alivardi Khan conscripted tribal and peasant levies from Birbhum. He responded to the Maratha attack by attacking the Maratha camp at Katwa in the First Battle of Katwa from the rear, at nightfall leading to a Subah victory. The Marathas believing a much larger force had been mobilized, evacuated out of Bengal on 17 September 1742. Bhaskar Pant the Maratha commander, was killed in action. In 1743, Raghuji occupied Burdwan with his camp at Katwa.

=== Third invasion (1744) ===
The Marathas tried again in 1745 where they succeeded in occupying Orissa to take Katwa. The force of 20,000 horsemen ravaged Murshidabad and moved onwards to Katwa. The force was led by Raghuji Bhonsle, the Maratha ruler of Nagpur where he and his force were defeated by Alivardi Khan at the Second Battle of Katwa.

=== Fourth invasion (1745–1747) ===
The Battle of Burdwan oversaw Alivardi Khan heavily repulsing and defeating the Janoji Bhonsle led Marathas. By way of the jungles of north Birbhum and the Khargpur hills (south of Mungir), Raghuji arrived near Fatua which he pillaged heavily, and then turned south-west, plundering Shaikhpura and many villages in the Tikari zamindari, till he struck the Son river. An army was amassed to defend against the invading Maratha forces at Orissa after the dismissal of Mir Jafar by Alivardi Khan.

=== Fifth invasion (1748–1751) ===
Janoji Bhonsle and Mir Habib enlisted in the army of Afghans at Rani Sarai to fight against Alivardi Khan at the Battle of Rani Sarai. Alivardi Khan was able to break the Afghan lines and make them retreat through the use of war elephants by his eager generals and eventually he won the battle.

== Campaign timeline ==
Battle	Time	Location	Belligerents		Result
Battle	Time	Location	Bengal Subah	Maratha Empire	Result
Siege of Barabati Fort	19 April 1742	Barabati fort, Cuttack	Shaikh Masum Khan	Kingdom of Nagpur: Bhaskar Ram Kolhatkar	Maratha victory
Siege of Hoogly	May 1742	Hooghly	Muhammad Raza Khan	Kingdom of Nagpur: Mir Habib; Shesh Rao	Maratha victory
Battle of Katwa (1742)	27 September 1742	Katwa	Alivardi Khan	Kingdom of Nagpur: Bhaskar Ram Kolhatkar	Bengal Subah victory
Battle of Jaipur	October	Jeypore, Odisha	Shaikh Masum Khan †	Kingdom of Nagpur: Unknown	Maratha victory
Battle of Midnapore	Pre-December 1742	Balasore, Odisha	Alivardi Khan	Kingdom of Nagpur: Bhaskar Ram Kolhatkar	Bengal Subah victory
Siege of Ghauspur Fort	February 1743	Fort of Ghauspur, Gaya, Bihar	Ahmad Khan Qureshi	Peshwa of the Maratha Empire: Balaji Baji Rao	Maratha victory
Battle of Birbhum	April 1743	Birbhum	Alivardi Khan; Balaji Baji Rao	Kingdom of Nagpur: Raghuji I	Bengal Subah–Peshwa victory
Siege of Barabati (1745)	May 1745	Barabati fort, Cuttack	Durlabh Ram (POW); Mir Abdul Aziz (surrendered)	Kingdom of Nagpur: Raghuji I	Maratha victory
Battle of Naubatpur (1745)	November 1745	Muhib Alipur, near Naubatpur, Bihar	Alivardi Khan	Kingdom of Nagpur: Raghuji I; Afghan rebels	Bengal Subah victory
Battle of Bhagalpur (1745)	December 1745	Bhagalpur, Bihar	Alivardi Khan	Kingdom of Nagpur: Raghuji I	Bengal Subah victory
Battle of Ranidighi	22 December 1745	Ranidighi, near Katwa	Alivardi Khan	Kingdom of Nagpur: Raghuji I	Bengal Subah victory
Battle of Midnapore	12 December 1746	Near Midnapore	Mir Jafar	Sayyid Nur	Bengal Subah victory
Battle of Burdwan	February 1747	Burdwan	Mir Jafar; Ataullah Khan Sabet Jang; Fakhruddin Beg Khan	Kingdom of Nagpur: Janoji; Mir Habib	Indecisive
Battle of Burdwan	March 1747	Burdwan	Alivardi Khan	Kingdom of Nagpur: Janoji	Bengal Subah victory
Battle of Champanagar	May 1748	Champanagar, Bihar	Alivardi Khan	Kingdom of Nagpur: Mir Habib	Bengal Subah victory
Battle of Rani Sarai	16 April 1748	Rani Sarai, near Barh, Bihar	Alivardi Khan	Kingdom of Nagpur: Mir Habib; Janoji of Nagpur; Afghan rebels	Bengal Subah victory
Battle of Midnapore	March 1749	Near Midnapore	Dost Muhammad Khan; Mir Kazim Khan	Kingdom of Nagpur: Mir Habib	Bengal Subah victory
Siege of Cuttack (1749)	May – June 1749	Cuttack, Odisha	Alivardi Khan	Kingdom of Nagpur: Sayyid Nur (POW); Sarandaz Khan †; Dharmadas Hazari (POW)	Bengal Subah victory
Maratha recapture of Cuttack	June 1749	Cuttack, Odisha	Shaikh Abdus Subhan (POW)	Kingdom of Nagpur: Mir Habib	Maratha victory
Battle of Midnapore	December 1750	Midnapore	Alivardi Khan	Kingdom of Nagpur: Mir Habib	Bengal Subah victory

== Atrocities during Maratha invasions ==
There were a total of five invasions between 1742 and 1751. The continuous conflict took a heavy toll on the population of Bengal. During that period of invasion by the Marathas, the light cavalry called Bargis perpetrated atrocities against the local population of Bengalis and Biharis. As reported in Bardhaman Raj and European sources, the Bargis are said to have plundered villages. Jan Kersseboom, chief of the Dutch East India Company factory in Bengal, estimated that perhaps 400,000 civilians in Western Bengal and Bihar died in the overall conflict. According to Sabyasachi Bhattacharya in the Bengal region 14 out of every 1,000 people was killed resulting 350,000 deaths. Contemporary accounts of the invasions report mass gang rape and Wartime sexual violence against women and children, and mutilation of victims by the Marathas which included cutting off their hands and noses and forced castrations The Marathas enslaved children in Bengal. Many of the Bengalis in western Bengal also fled to take shelter in Eastern Bengal, fearing for their lives in the wake of the Maratha attacks. Zamindars outside the affected districts and also from the districts that involved this conflict were affected by the Maratha raids.

Historians generally view Maharashta Purana particularly as a "contemporary mirror" of the Maratha plunders. William Dalrymple states that the Maharashta Purana presents a clear and vivid depiction of the invasions.

Historian William Dalrymple quotes Gangaram's Maharashtra Purana, a contemporary account describing the atrocities committed by the Marathas in Bengal:

They constantly shouted, 'Give us rupees, give us rupees, give us rupees. When they got no rupees, they filled their victims' nostrils with water, or drowned them in tanks. When they demanded money and it was not given to them, they would put a man to death... Bungalows, thatched-roofed houses, Vishnu-mandapas, they burned them all, large and small Every Brahman or Vaishnava or sannyasi whom they saw they killed, and they slaughtered cows and women by the hundreds.

The Bargi atrocities were corroborated by contemporary Dutch and British accounts. The atrocities devastated Bengal's economy, as many of the people killed in the Bargi raids included merchants, textile weavers, silk winders, and mulberry cultivators. The Cossimbazar factory reported in 1742, for example, that the Bargis burnt down many of the houses where silk piece goods were made, along with weavers' looms. In 1743 two Maratha armies invaded - one belonged to Raghuji Bhosle, the other to Balaji Rao again. Alivardi Khan was obliged to pay a subsidy and promise to pay him chauth (tax) in the future.

Baneswar Vidyalankar's text Chitrachampu attributed the victories of the Marathas to "the wonderfully fast horses they ride." Bharatchandra's Annadamangal attributed the attacks to a particular communal factor which was the destruction of temples at Bhubaneswar by Alivardi's soldiers.

Vaneshwar Vidyalankar, courtier of the Raja of Burdwan wrote in 1744 AD,

"Shahu Rajah's troops are niggard of pity, slayers of pregnant women and infants, of Brahmans and the poor, fierce of spirit, expert in robbing the property of every one and in committing every sinful act. They created a local cataclysm and caused the extirpation of the people of the Bengal villages like an (ominous) comet .... In one day they can cross a hundred yojans. They slay the unarmed, the poor, women and children. They rob all property and abduct chaste wives. If it comes to a battle, they secretly flee away to some other country. Their main strength lies in their marvellously swift horses. Such was the tumultuous ocean of Bargi troops."

Gangarama writes in the same year regarding the Maratha brutality:

“As soon as Bhaskar arrived again, he summoned all his captains and ordered them, “Draw your swords and kill every man and woman that you see.” When the commander spoke thus, they plundered and slew on every side with shouts of kill ! kill ! ! Brahmans, Vaishnavs, Sannyasis, women and cows were slaughtered by the hundred.”

The internal fights within the Alivardi Khan's military also contributed to their losses. For example, in 1748 Pathan soldiers rebelled and seized Patna which they controlled for some time. Another example is the faujdar of Purnea who departed from Alivardi and created a small autonomous state. Apart from territorial losses, the Nawab of Bengal also suffered severe economic losses. Industries such as agriculture and trade were dislocated and a large number of people migrated from Western Bengal to the Northern and Eastern districts.

The further attacks took place in 1748 in Bihar, on Murshidabad in 1750, and in 1751 in Western Bengal.

== End of hostilities and aftermath ==
In 1751, the Marathas signed a peace treaty with the Nawab of Bengal. Negotiations for a treaty were conducted between Mirza Saleh, representing the Marathas, and Mir Jafar, representing the Nawab. Mir Jafar introduced Mirza Saleh to the Nawab at Katwa, after which they proceeded to Murshidabad to finalize the treaty's terms. The agreement was formally signed with the approval of the Nagpur court in May or June 1751, based on the mutually agreed conditions. The terms reads as follows:

1. Mir Habib the former courtier of Alivardi Khan, who had defected to the Marathas was made provincial governor of Orissa under nominal control of the Nawab of Bengal.
2. From October 1751, 1.2 million Rupees will be paid annually as the chauth of Bengal and Bihar, and the Marathas agreed not to invade Bengal again. The Nawab of Bengal also paid Rs. 3.2 million to the Marathas, towards the arrears of chauth for the preceding years.
3. The territories beyond the Subarnarekha River near Jalasore was fixed as the boundary of the Bengal subah, and the Marathas. Marathas agreed to never cross the Subarnarekha River.

Thus de facto Maratha control over Orissa was established by 1751, while de jure it remained a part of Bengal Subah till 1752. After the assassination of Mir Habib, the governor of Orissa in 1752, the Marathas formally incorporated Orissa in their dominion, as part of Kingdom of Nagpur.

== Bibliography ==
- Datta, K. K. (1978). "Bengal Subah (1707-1756)". In Banerjee, A.C.; Ghase, D. K. (eds.). A Comprehensive History of India: 1712-1772, edited by A. C. Banerjee and D. K. Ghase. People's Publishing House.
- Sarkar, Jadunath (1943). The History of Bengal. Vol. II. Ramna, Dhaka: The University of Dhaka.
- Haque, Mohammed Anwarul (1980). Muslim Administration in Orissa, 1568-1751 A.D. Punthi Pustak.
- Dalrymple, William (2020). The Anarchy. Bloomsbury Publishing. ISBN 978-1-5266-3401-6.
- Datta, Kalikinkar (1939). Alivardi and His Times. University of Calcutta.
- Rahim, M. A. (1971). Rahim, M. A; Abdul Momin, Chowdhury; Mahmood, A. B Mahiuddin; Islam, Sirajul (eds.). Bangladesher Itihas [Bangladesh's History] (in Bengali) (1st ed.). Dhaka: M. Alam Iden Press. pp. 285–305.
- Shejwalkar, T. S. (1941). "The Bengal Episode in Maratha History". Bulletin of the Deccan College Research Institute. 2 (3/4): 361–382. ISSN 0045-9801.
- Malik, Zahiruddin (1977). The Reign of Muhammad Shah, 1719-1748. Asia Publishing House. ISBN 978-0-210-40598-7.
- Ray, Bhabani Charan (1960). Orissa Under Marathas, 1751-1803. Kitab Mahal. Archived from the original on 21 January 2024.
- Sarkar, Jadunath (1964). Fall Of The Mughal Empire 1739-1754. Vol. I (3rd ed.). Orient Longman Ltd.
- Bhattacharya, Sabyasachi, ed. (2020). A Comprehensive History of Modern Bengal, 1700-1950. Vol. I. Kolkata: The Asiatic Society. ISBN 978-93-89901-95-5.
