= Siege of Barabati (1745) =

Maratha siege of Barabati fort in Odisha

- Part of Fourth Maratha invasion of Bengal
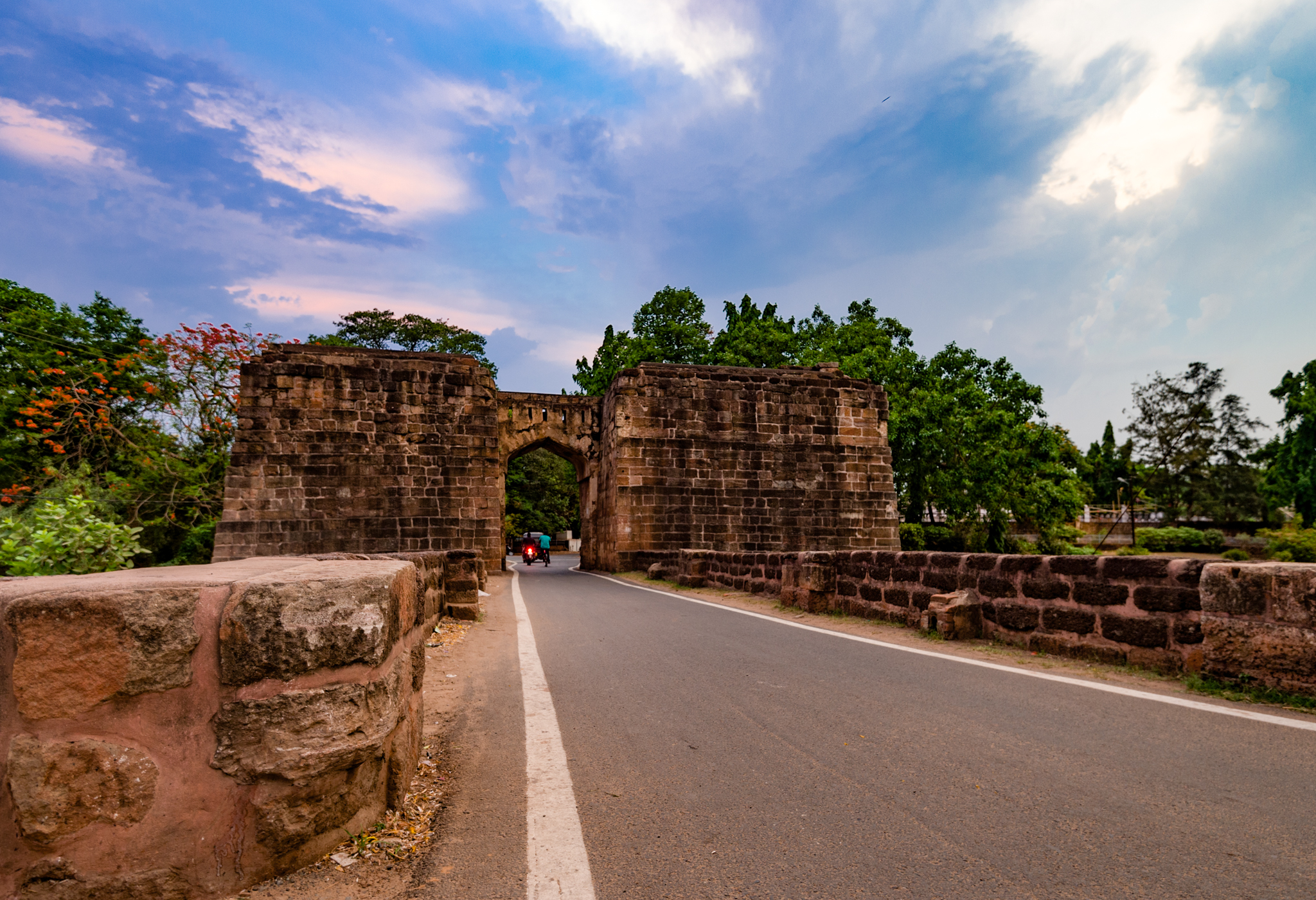
- Gate of the Barabati fort in Cuttack
Date	March – 6/12 May 1745 (Note: The date is 6 May or 12 May)
Location	Barabati fort, Cuttack, Bengal Subah 20°29′4.67″N 85°51′51.93″E
Result	Maratha victory
Territorial changes	Odisha upto Midnapore annexed by Kingdom of Nagpur

Belligerents
Bengal Subah	Maratha Empire; Kingdom of Nagpur

Commanders and leaders
Durlabh Ram (Note: Durlabh Ram not Durlabhram) (POW); Mir Abdul Aziz (surrendered)	Raghuji I Mir Habib

Strength
400 garrison	14,000–24,000 cavalry 25,000 infantry 300 guns

Casualties and losses
Unknown	Unknown
- Location within Odisha Siege of Barabati (India)

The Siege of Barabati (1745) was a significant military engagement during the Maratha invasions of Bengal. In February 1745, Raghuji Bhonsle instigated by Mustafa Khan advanced toward Orissa, catching Durlabh Ram, the Na’ib Nazim. Unaware of the approaching enemy, Durlabh Ram fled to Barabati Fort, which was swiftly surrounded by Raghuji's troops. Durlabh Ram's ill-advised visit to Raghuji's camp led to his capture, and he was held hostage. Despite his capture and imprisonment, his lieutenant Mir Abdul Aziz resisted the Marathas for a month until his surrender. Thus Raghuji’s Bargi forces swept over the territories of Medinipur, Burdwan, and Birbhum before advancing to Bihar, where they allied with Afghans rebels.

== Background ==
In February 1745, Mustafa Khan bolted from Murshidabad in full rebellion against Alivardi Khan and sent a letter to Raghuji of Nagpur, revealing his plan to invade Bihar. He urged Raghuji to join him in taking down Alivardi with a Maratha raid. Raghuji acted upon the proposal. After Mustafa Khan’s rebellion, his nephew, Deputy Governor (Naib Nazim) of Orissa Abdul Rasul Khan, joined him. Thus Durlabh Ram, son of Raja Jankiram, had been appointed Naib Nazim of Orissa.

== Siege ==
In March, Raghuji immediately led an army of 14,000–24,000 cavalry, 25,000 infantry and 300 guns to Orissa. Durlabh Ram was a feeble-minded, overly superstitious individual heavily influenced by Hindu religious figures. According to Ghulam Husain, Durlabh Ram was duped by a number of Hindu sanaysis who were spies of Raghuji.

As Maratha forces advanced toward Orissa, Durlabh Ram, preoccupied with religious ceremonies along the Mahanadi River, remained unaware of their approach until they were nearly upon him. Another officer Mir Abdul Aziz, received intelligence of the Marathas' proximity and hastened to Durlabh Ram with twenty troopers, only to find the Durlabh Ram still asleep, oblivious to the impending threat. Awakened, Durlabh Ram hurriedly entered a palanquin, intending to seek refuge in Barabati Fort. En route, he witnessed Maratha troops plundering the city, prompting him to abandon the palanquin and flee on horseback, reaching the fort with great difficulty. Raghuji Bhonsle arrived shortly thereafter, encircling the fort.

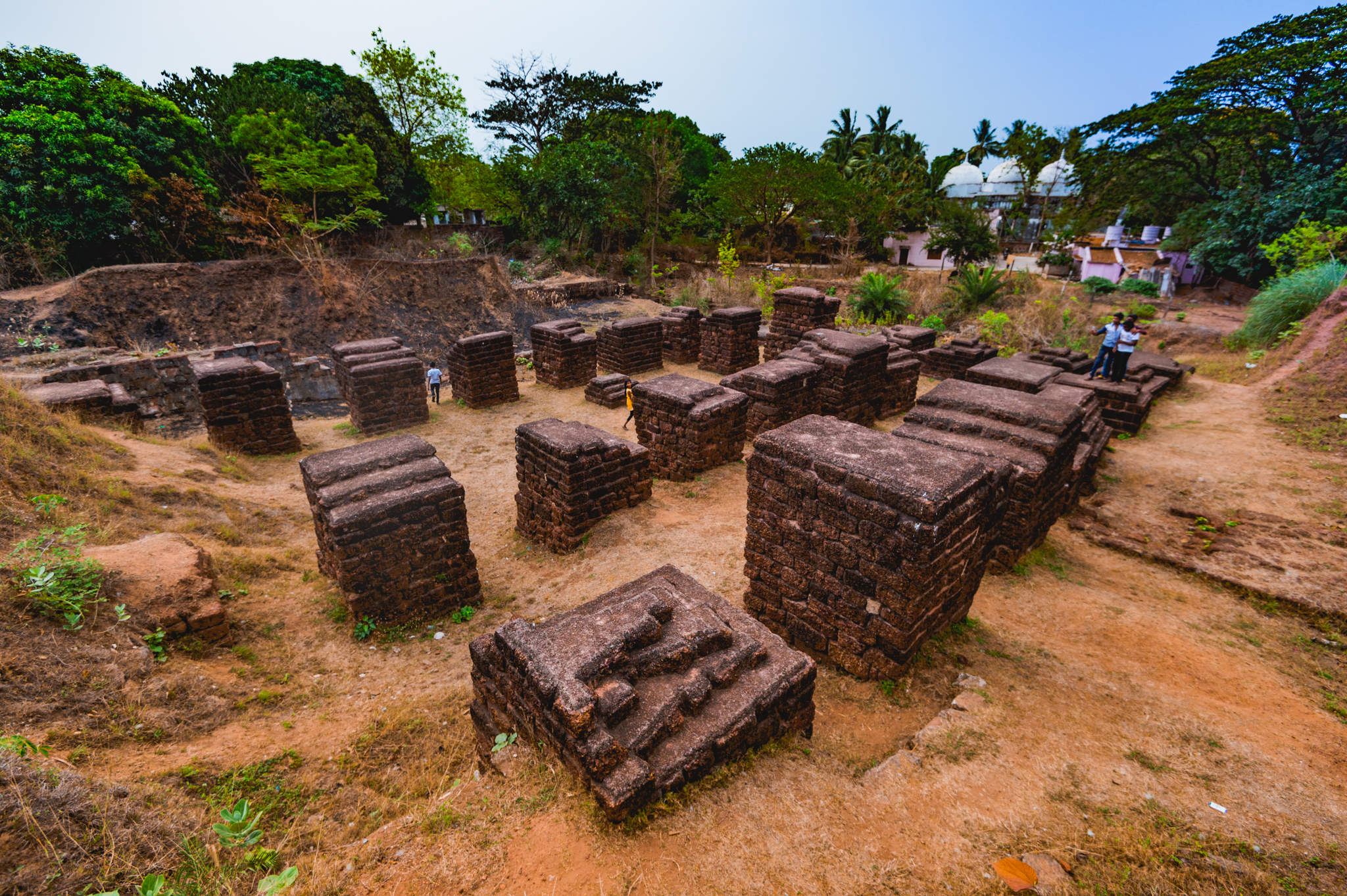
Ruins of Barabati Fort also known as Fort of Cuttack. Mausoleum of Ali Shahid Bukhari is seen on right of the frame.

Durlabh Ram understood that Nawab Alivardi was in no position to help him as he was busy engaging Afghan rebels. Following the advice of the sanyasis, Durlabh Ram, proposed surrendering to the Maratha forces, but his proposal was opposed by Mir Abdul Aziz. Despite this, Durlabh Ram imprudently visited Raghuji Bhonsle’s camp with his officers and laid his arms. Mir Abdul Aziz, steadfastly refused to surrender Barabati Fort, even after Durlabh Ram’s pressure. Consequently, the Marathas imprisoned Durlabh Ram and held him as a hostage. Mir Abdul Aziz with 400 garrison defended the fort for one month. But outside its walls, whole of Orissa up to Medinipur including Hijli, Hooghly, was occupied by the Marathas. The greater part of Burdwan was also plundered. He eventually capitulated on 6 or 12 May under the condition of safe passage and was allowed to move to Murshidabad, while Durlabh Ram was freed in 1746 when a ransom was paid for his release. Raghuji left Mir Habib in charge of Orissa under 1,000 cavalry and 2,000 at the Barabati fort before proceeding towards Burdwan. Meanwhile Mustafa Khan was killed at Bihar.

== Aftermath ==
Marathas then proceeded to Bihar ravaging Midnapore, Burdwan, Birbhum. They looted Bihar and allied with the Afghan rebels. Alivardi followed the Marathas to Bihar and defeated them in a battle near Muhib Alipur in November 1745. In May 1749, Alivardi besieged Cuttack and recovered Orissa. But Marathas soon retook Orissa defeating its deputy governor.

== See also ==
- First Maratha invasion of Bengal
- Second Maratha invasion of Bengal
- Battle of Bhagalpur (1745)

== Bibliography ==
- Banerji, R. D. (1951). History of Orissa. Vol. II. Calcutta: Prabasi Press.
- Datta, Kalikinkar (1939). Alivardi and His Times. University of Calcutta.
- Sarkar, Jadunath (1964). Fall Of The Mughal Empire 1739-1754. Vol. I (3rd ed.). Orient Longman Ltd.
- Sardesai, Govind Sakharam (1946). New History Of The Marathas. Vol. II. Bombay: Phoenix Publications.
- Sarkar, Jadunath (1943). The History of Bengal. Vol. II. Ramna, Dhaka: The University of Dhaka.
- Rahim, M. A. (1971). Rahim, M. A; Abdul Momin, Chowdhury; Mahmood, A. B Mahiuddin; Islam, Sirajul (eds.). Bangladesher Itihas [Bangladesh's History] (in Bengali) (1st ed.). Dhaka: M. Alam Eden Press. pp. 285–305.
- Shejwalkar, T. S. (1941). "The Bengal Episode in Maratha History". Bulletin of the Deccan College Research Institute. 2 (3/4): 361–382. ISSN 0045-9801. JSTOR 42931283.
- Ray, Bhabani Charan (1960). Orissa Under Marathas, 1751-1803. Kitab Mahal. Archived from the original on 2024-01-21.
