= Battle of Katwa (1742) =

Part of First Maratha invasion of Bengal

- Part of First Maratha invasion of Bengal
Date	27 September 1742
Location	Katwa, West Bengal 23°38′27″N 88°7′50″E
Result	Bengal Subah victory

Belligerents
Bengal Subah	Maratha Empire; Kingdom of Nagpur

Commanders and leaders
Alivardi Khan; Zain ud-Din Ahmed Khan; Mahdi Nisar Khan; Abdul Ali Khan; Saif Khan	Bhaskar Ram Kolhatkar

Strength
16,000–17,000	Unknown

Casualties and losses
Heavy	Heavy
- Location within West Bengal Battle of Katwa (India)

The Battle of Katwa was a decisive engagement fought on 27 September 1742 between the forces of Nawab Alivardi Khan of Bengal and the Maratha general Bhaskar Pandit during the Maratha invasions of Bengal. Launching a surprise dawn attack amid the Durga Puja festivities at Daihat, Alivardi exploited flooded terrain to neutralize Maratha cavalry superiority. After an initial rout, the nawab executed a daring night crossing of the Bhagirathi and Ajay River at Uddharanpur, overcoming the collapse of a boat-bridge that drowned 1,500 of his men. A force of 3,000 Bengal troops then struck the Maratha western flank, scattering the enemy toward Katwa and inflicting heavy losses.

== Background ==
During the monsoon interlude of 1742, both Alivardi and Maratha's were waiting for reinforcement. Bhaskar Pandit, dispatched two captains to his Raghuji I in Nagpur with urgent pleas for fresh troops, but these entreaties went unheeded. Determined to seize the initiative, Alivardi resolved to strike the Marathas before the roads dries.

== Prelude ==
Alivardi Khan camped in the suburbs of Murshidabad, and devoted himself to fortifying his forces in anticipation of renewed hostilities with the Marathas once the monsoon season had concluded. The nawab's artillery underwent reorganization; a number of war elephants were trained to precede his own mount in formation; and a formidable flotilla was assembled by requisitioning vessels from Dhaka, Malda, and Rajmahal. Alivardi further solicited assistance from the Mughal emperor Muhammad Shah (r. 1719–1748) in Delhi and directed appeals to his deputies at Patna and Purnea for support against the Maratha incursions. At the time Zain ud-Din deputy of Patna received the nawab's summons. Accordingly, Zain-ud-Din proceeded to Murshidabad at the head of 5,000 cavalry and between 6,000 and 7,000 infantry, accompanied by Mahdi Nisar Khan and Abdul Ali Khan. Saif Khan likewise arrived from Purnea with a contingent of 5,000 men.

== Battle ==
Alivardi subsequently departed the suburbs of Murshidabad with his two nephews, his kinsman Abdul Ali Khan, and a disciplined and well-equipped force, while the terrain remained sodden and partially inundated. Meanwhile, Bhaskar Pandit was observing the Durga Puja festivities at Daihat, (Note: approximately five miles southeast of Katwa) levying contributions from certain zamindars of western Bengal. On the third day of the festival, 27 September 1742, the nawab launched a dawn assault upon the Maratha encampment. Caught unawares, the Marathas fled toward Katwa, abandoning a portion of their baggage and equipment. After several days' march, the nawab arrived at a position on the eastern bank of the Bhagirathi River, opposite Katwa. At this juncture, the smaller Ajay River flows westward into the Bhagirathi. The principal Maratha force was encamped west of the Bhagirathi, facing the Ajay, while a detachment stood ready with artillery aboard a sloop anchored in the Bhagirathi adjacent to Katwa. Despite maintaining vigilant defenses, the Marathas held their fortified position; the nawab's artillery bombardment across the river, sustained for eight days, failed to dislodge them.

The western flank of the Maratha army remained inadequately defended, prompting the nawab to devise a plan to assault it by secretly crossing both the Bhagirathi and the Ajay rivers. For several miles upstream from Katwa, both banks of the Bhagirathi lay beyond Maratha control. This enabled the nawab to construct a temporary bridge of boats across the Bhagirathi at Uddharanpur and to ferry his army to the north bank of the Ajay. The vessels were then released downstream, one or two at a time, until they reached the Ajay's confluence with the Bhagirathi, approximately one mile above the Maratha encampment. Utilizing these boats, the nawab directed the erection of a bridge across the Ajay before dawn, intending to cross the river undetected and evade Maratha notice. As the Bengal troops commenced crossing, however, one or two boats in the bridge's center gave way, resulting in the drowning of 1,500 soldiers. The structure was swiftly repaired, and before the first light of dawn appeared in the east, some 2,500–3,000 Bengal troops had gained the south bank of the Ajay. Advancing rapidly for a mile, they launched a sudden assault on the Maratha camp. The Marathas fled at once, without ascertaining the enemy's numbers or offering resistance. The Bengal forces pursued them relentlessly, inflicting heavy casualties. In the morning, the nawab dispatched reinforcements including elephants, cannon, and additional troops from the Ajay's opposite bank and soon arrived personally at the battlefield.

== Aftermath ==
Bhaskar fled to Pachet and his detachments scattered in Burdwan, Hooghly, Hijli.

== See also ==
- Third Maratha invasion of Bengal
- Battle of Naubatpur (1745)
- Siege of Barabati (1745)
- Siege of Cuttack (1749)

== Bibliography ==
- Datta, Kalikinkar (1939). Alivardi and His Times. University of Calcutta.
- Sarkar, Jadunath (1964). Fall Of The Mughal Empire 1739-1754. Vol. I (3rd ed.). Orient Longman Ltd.
- Rahim, M. A. (1971). Rahim, M. A; Abdul Momin, Chowdhury; Mahmood, A. B Mahiuddin; Islam, Sirajul (eds.). Bangladesher Itihas [Bangladesh's History] (in Bengali) (1st ed.). Dhaka: M. Alam Iden Press. pp. 285–305.
- Sarkar, Jadunath (1943). The History of Bengal. Vol. II. Ramna, Dhaka: The University of Dhaka.
- Mishra, Shree Govind (1970). History of Bihar, 1740-1772. Lawrence Verry Incorporated. ISBN 978-0-8426-0172-6.
