= Battle of Katwa =

Battle of Katwa, may refer to:

- Battle of Katwa (1742), battle between the Bengal Subah and the Kingdom of Nagpur
- Battle of Katwa (1745), battle between the Bengal Subah and the Kingdom of Nagpur
- Battle of Katwa (1763), battle between the Bengal Subah and the British East India Company
