= Battle of Naubatpur (1745) =

1745 battle between Alivardi and Marathas

- Part of Fourth Maratha invasion of Bengal and Afghan insurrections in Bengal
Date	14–21 December 1745
Location	Muhib-Alipur, Naubatpur, Bihar, Bengal Subah 25°26′40″N 84°49′40″E
Result	Bengal Subah victory

Belligerents
Bengal Subah	Maratha Empire; Kingdom of Nagpur; Afghan rebels

Commanders and leaders
Alivardi Khan; Mir Jafar; Shamshir Khan	Raghoji I (WIA); Mahimaji Baba †; Sankaraji Baba †; Murtaza Khan; Buland Khan

Strength
12,000	14,000 or 20,000

Casualties and losses
Unknown	Unknown
- Location within Bihar Battle at Naubatpur (India)

The Battle of Naubatpur was a military engagement near during the Fourth Maratha invasion of Bengal in December 1745. The forces of the Bengal Subah, led by Nawab Alivardi Khan, fought against the invading Maratha army under Raghuji Bhonsle of Nagpur. The battle was fought near Muhib Alipur, northeast of Naubatpur (in present-day Bihar, India). The army of Bengal Subah decisively defeated the invading Maratha forces.

== Background ==
In 1745, Raghuji Bhonsle invaded Orissa, subsequently captured Cuttack and imprisoned the governor, Durlabh Ram. The Marathas then gained control of all of Orissa up to Midnapore. In the meantime, Afghan leader Mustafa Khan was slain in the battle of Jagdishpur on 20 June 1745. His army fled away to the village of Magror near Chainpur and Sasaram under Mustafa's son Murtaza Khan.

Around this time, Murtaza Khan along with Buland Khan and other beleaguered Afghans, who had endured hardship in the Magror hills following Mustafa Khan's death, dispatched desperate pleas to Raghuji Bhonsle for rescue. Raghuji encamped near Ramgarh. Deeming their alliance advantageous to his cause, he advanced in Gaya in September 1745. Raghuji arrived near Fatua, pillaged and burned Shaikhpura and numerous villages in the Tekari Raj, ultimately reaching the Son River. After crossing it, he advanced to Magror, where he rescued the Afghans and recovered their property. He then looted the surrounding area for two months.

== Battle ==
The combined forces of Marathas and Afghans swelling up to 14,000 or 20,000 troops proceeded towards Patna. Alivardi determined to expel the Marathas out of Bengal, left Murshidabad to Bihar at the head of 12,000 cavalry in October 1745. Upon learning of Alivardi's advance, the Marathas withdrew from Patna southward. The Nawab encamped for several days at Bankipur. There he organised his army and collected supplies. He then advanced against the enemy via Naubatpur with a fully restocked army backed by heavy artillery. The Marathas, however, avoided open battle and moved ahead of him. Maintaining a distance beyond cannon range and plundering villages the Maratha forces reached Muhib Alipur, (Note: Muhib Alipur lies 8 miles (13 km) west of Arwal and 13 miles (21 km) northeast of Naubatpur, which is situated on the eastern bank of the Sone River.) the site of Raghuji's encampment.

There the early ranks of the Bengal army, under Mir Jafar Khan and Shamshir Khan, launched a sudden attack on Raghuji. Raghuji was surrounded by rest of the Nawab's forces. The Marathas exerted themselves to rescue their leader, who ultimately escaped owing to negligence on Shamshir Khan's part or more likely accepted bribe. Meanwhile, Alivardi advanced to join his army in punishing the Marathas. Raghuji, however, fought valiantly and held his position during eighteen days of combat, despite sustaining a chance gunshot wound to the mouth which knocked one of his tooth. A running fight continued from 14 November till 20. Two of Maratha generals, Mahimaji Baba and Sankaraji Baba, were killed on 14 and 20 November, respectively.

== Aftermath ==
The Nawab's rapid march outpaced his baggage and tents, halting him for days. Envoys were sent by Nawab's wife to negotiate peace with Raghuji. Though Raghuji was amenable, Mir Habib refused and urged a dash to loot undefended Murshidabad. The Marathas doubled back toward Bengal, with Alivardi in pursuit amid severe food shortages. Alivardi's small escort at Champanagar was attacked by Raghuji. In the ensuing conflict, Nawab's main army arrived and repelled them at the Battle of Bhagalpur.

== See also ==
- First Maratha invasion of Bengal
- Second Maratha invasion of Bengal
- Third Maratha invasion of Bengal
- Fifth Maratha invasion of Bengal

== Bibliography ==
- Datta, Kalikinkar (1939). Alivardi and His Times. University of Calcutta.
- Rahim, M. A. (1971). Rahim, M. A; Abdul Momin, Chowdhury; Mahmood, A. B Mahiuddin; Islam, Sirajul (eds.). Bangladesher Itihas [Bangladesh's History] (in Bengali) (1st ed.). Dhaka: M. Alam Iden Press. pp. 285–305.
- Sarkar, Jadunath (1943). The History of Bengal. Vol. II. Ramna, Dhaka: The University of Dhaka.
- Sarkar, Jadunath (1964). Fall Of The Mughal Empire 1739-1754. Vol. I (3rd ed.). Orient Longman Ltd.
- Shejwalkar, T. S. (1941). "The Bengal Episode in Maratha History". Bulletin of the Deccan College Research Institute. 2 (3/4): 361–382. ISSN 0045-9801.
