= Dariyapur, Naubatpur =

Village and Gram Panchayat in Naubatpur, Patna, Bihar

Daryapur
- Village
- Location in Bihar, India
- Coordinates: 25.51°N 84.96°E
- Country: India
- State: Bihar

Area
  - Total: 408 ha (1,010 acres)

Population (2011)
  - Total: 4,284
- PIN: 801109

Dariyapur (also spelled Dariapur) is a village and Gram Panchayat in Naubatpur block of Patna district in the Indian state of Bihar.

== Geography ==
Dariyapur is located in Naubatpur subdivision, approximately 4 km from the sub-district headquarters of Naubatpur and 38 km from the district headquarters Patna. The village has a geographical area of 408 hectares.

== Demographics ==
According to the 2011 Census of India, Dariyapur had a population of 4,284, comprising 2,232 males and 2,052 females, with a sex ratio of 919 females per 1,000 males. The village has 727 households.

The village had 777 children in the age group 0-6 years. The literacy rate of Dariyapur was 53.80%, with male literacy at 62.63% and female literacy at 44.20%.

== Administration ==
Dariyapur functions as its own Gram Panchayat and is part of Naubatpur block panchayat. The village code is 245491 according to Census 2011 records. The postal pincode is 801109.

== Gram Panchayat and Governance ==
Dariyapur Gram Panchayat is registered on the eGramSwaraj portal, the Government of India's digital platform for Panchayati Raj institutions. The Panchayat manages local governance functions including rural development, infrastructure projects, and welfare schemes.

The village participates in the Mahatma Gandhi National Rural Employment Guarantee Act (MGNREGA) program, which provides employment opportunities to rural households.

== Development and Schemes ==
As part of Bihar's rural development initiatives, Dariyapur has access to various central and state government schemes. The village is covered under the Pradhan Mantri Gram Sadak Yojana (PMGSY) for rural road connectivity.

The Panchayat directory maintained by the Government of Bihar lists Dariyapur as an active Gram Panchayat in Naubatpur block.

== Infrastructure ==
The village has a primary school, P.S. Dariapur Tola, which serves the local community. As per 2011 census data, the village had access to public and private bus services within 5-10 km distance, and a railway station is available within 10+ km distance.
