= Siege of Cuttack (1749) =

Part of Fifth Maratha invasion of Bengal

- Part of Fifth Maratha invasion of Bengal
Date	May – June 1749
Location	Cuttack, Odisha 20°29′04.89″N 85°51′54.63″E
Result	Inconclusive
Territorial changes	Odisha captured by Bengal Subah. Marathas reoccupy Odisha within a week.

Belligerents
Bengal Subah	Maratha Empire; Kingdom of Nagpur

Commanders and leaders
Alivardi Khan; Dost Muhammad Khan; Mir Kazim Khan; Mir Jafar; Faqirullah Beg; Raja Durlabh Ram; Shaikh Abdus Subhan Khan (POW)	Mir Habib; Sabaji; Sayyid Nur (POW); Sarandaz Khan †; Dharmadas Hazari (POW)

Strength
5,000–6,000 cavalry	7,000–8,000

Casualties and losses
Heavy	Unknown
- Location within Odisha Siege of Cuttack (India)

The Siege of Cuttack occurred in May 1749 during the Fifth Maratha invasion of Bengal, when Alivardi Khan (r. 1740–1756), Nawab of Bengal, sought to reconquer Orissa which had been under Maratha possession since its capture in 1745. Leaving Murshidabad in mid-March, he assembled troops at Katwa, disbanded mutinous artillery at Burdwan, and advanced to Midnapore with 5,000–6,000 cavalry, forcing Maratha commander Mir Habib to retreat. Pursuing through Balasore and Cuttack's jungles, Alivardi crossed the Vaitarani River at Bhadrak and Jajpur. Disregarding surrender offers from Maratha-aligned defectors controlling Barabati Fort, he launched a surprise attack with 2,000 men. With only 300 troops, he reached the fort on 17 May. The garrison initially agreed to capitulate but Alivardi besieged it, securing surrender after 15 days.

Appointing Abdus Subhan Khan as deputy governor to avoid the monsoon, Alivardi departed for Murshidabad. Marathas soon reemerged, wounded the deputy, and retook Cuttack. Informed at Balasore on 6 June. The siege briefly restored Bengali control before Maratha resurgence.

== Background ==
During the Maratha invasion in 1745, Raghuji I of Nagpur (r. 1739–1755) besieged the Fort of Barabati, successfully occupying the province of Orissa.

In mid-March 1749, Alivardi Khan departed from his capital, Murshidabad, and proceeded to Katwa to muster forces for the reconquest of Orissa. Several months earlier, he had dispatched Haider Ali Khan, the commander of his light artillery, to Burdwan with 8,000 troops to block the Maratha advance from the south. Upon reaching Burdwan en route to Orissa, Alivardi ordered Haider Ali Khan's detachment to join him in advancing to Midnapore. The soldiers, however, mutinied and refused to proceed until their outstanding pay arrears were settled. Alivardi dispatched tried to negotiate with the mutineers but failed. Enraged by the insubordination, Alivardi disbanded the entire unit.

Undeterred, he continued toward Midnapore with a reduced force of only 5,000 to 6,000 cavalry and no artillery.

== Capture of Cuttack ==
Alivardi reached Balasore on 8 May, 1749. Upon learning of Alivardi's approach, Mir Habib who encamped near Midnapore, burned his camp and retreated to Orissa with his followers. Alivardi Khan did not enter the town of Midnapore but crossed the Kasai River and encamped on its opposite bank. The Marathas had halted in the jungles of Midnapore, where they were pursued and defeated by the Nawab's generals, including Dost Muhammad Khan and Mir Kazim Khan. Alivardi Khan pursued the Marathas as far as Balasore, where he learned that Mir Habib, Sabaji, and their forces had withdrawn into the jungles of Cuttack. He advanced toward Cuttack, crossing the two branches of the Baitarani River at Bhadrak and Jajpur, and halted at Bara. (Note: Approximately 36 miles (58 km) north of Jajpur.) Sayyid Nur, Sarandaz Khan, and Dharmadas Hazari (the captain of musketeers) former officers of Nawab who had defected to the Marathas and been appointed by them to command the Barabati Fort. They dispatched letters expressing their intent to renew allegiance upon Alivardi's arrival in Cuttack. Alivardi disregarded these overtures and pressed the pursuit through the forests, contending with numerous obstacles and uncertainties.

Alivardi Khan, unable to locate the fugitives despite an extended and arduous march, emerged from the forest. Leaving a detachment to secure the exit route, he proceeded from Bara with approximately 2,000 troops to launch a surprise assault on Barabati Fort in Cuttack. Following a grueling march that reduced his force to just 300 exhausted soldiers, he reached the fort on 17 May 1749. The garrison, rather than resisting, initially agreed to surrender the following day. On the morning of 18 May, when the fort's officers arrived to meet Alivardi, Sayyid Nur and Dharmadas Hazari were placed under strict confinement, while Sarandaz Khan, who offered minor resistance, was killed. He entered the city of Cuttack on 18 May. Upon learning of their commanders' fate, the garrison of Barabati fort resolved to defend the fort and barred its gates. Alivardi promptly besieged it. At this stage Mir Jafar, Faqirullah Beg and Raja Durlabh Ram Rai arrived and pressed the siege of Barabati. After holding out for 15 days, the defenders capitulated. The whole of Orissa came under Alivardi's domain.

== Aftermath ==
Alivardi Khan resolved to return expeditiously to his capital after appointing a deputy governor for Orissa. Both Mir Jafar and Durlabh Ram declined the position, fearing that the 7,000 to 8,000 Marathas concealed in nearby jungles would reemerge following his withdrawal. He subsequently appointed Shaikh Abdus Subhan Khan to the post and commenced the journey back to Murshidabad. Cuttack was swiftly reoccupied by the Marathas. Within six or seven days of Alivardi's departure, they emerged from hiding and wounded Abdus Subhan Khan despite his valiant resistance. Abdus Subhan Khan was imprisoned. Alivardi learned of the setback upon reaching Balasore on 6 June 1749. Thus Alivardi's conquest was undone in a week. Unable to return due to his troops' exhaustion and the onset of the rainy season, he pressed on toward Murshidabad amid considerable hardships, arriving in early July.

== See also ==
- Battle of Patna (1745)
- Battle of Naubatpur (1745)
- Battle of Jagdishpur (1745)
- Battle of Bhagalpur (1745)

== Bibliography ==
- Datta, Kalikinkar (1939). Alivardi and His Times. University of Calcutta.
- Sarkar, Jadunath (1964). Fall Of The Mughal Empire 1739-1754. Vol. I (3rd ed.). Orient Longman Ltd.
- Banerji, R. D. (1951). History of Orissa. Vol. II. Calcutta: Prabasi Press.
- Ray, Bhabani Charan (1960). Orissa Under Marathas, 1751-1803. Kitab Mahal. Archived from the original on 2024-01-21.
