= Fourth Maratha invasion of Bengal =

Maratha invasion of Bengal (1745–1747)

- Part of Maratha invasions of Bengal and Afghan insurrections in Bengal Subah
Date	February 1745 – 1747
Location	Bengal Subah (in parts of West Bengal and modern Orissa)
Result	Inconclusive
Territorial changes	Marathas occupy Odisha upto Midnapore

Belligerents
Bengal Subah	Maratha Empire; Kingdom of Nagpur; Afghan rebels

Commanders and leaders
Alivardi Khan; Zain ud-Din Ahmed Khan; Mir Abdul Aziz; Dost Muhammad Khan; Ataullah Khan; Fakhrullah Beg Khan	Raghoji I (WIA); Mir Habib; Mustafa Khan (WIA); Buland Khan Ruhela; Abdul Rasul Khan †; Janoji I

Strength
Barabati: 400; Naubatpur: 14,000–20,000; Bhagalpur: 600; Cuttack: 7,000–8,000 cavalry and 12,000 infantry	Barabati: 14,000–20,000 cavalry 25,000 infantry 300 guns Naubatpur: 12,000; Bhagalpur: 5,000–6,000; Cuttack: 8,000 cavalry and 20,000 infantry

Casualties and losses
Heavy	Heavy

The Fourth Maratha Invasion of Bengal in 1745 was a military campaign led by the Maratha general Raghuji Bhonsle against the Nawab of Bengal, Alivardi Khan, in retaliation for the assassination of the Maratha general Bhaskar Ram Kolhatkar. Launched amid internal rebellions within the Bengal Subah, the invasion saw Maratha forces penetrate deep into Bengal and temporarily seize control of Orissa.

Despite initial setbacks, Alivardi Khan's personal intervention and strategic appointments ultimately contained the Maratha advance, though Orissa remained contested into 1747. Raghuji, incensed by the killing of Bhaskar, exploited a rebellion by Alivardi's Afghan general Mustafa Khan to invade Bengal territories. Maratha troops entered Orissa in March 1745, subduing the region before advancing to the vicinity of Calcutta in May, Burdwan in June, and Birbhum in July. By the end of the rainy season, Raghuji marched toward Bihar, linking up with remnants of Mustafa Khan's defeated Afghan forces, who had retreated to the hills near Chainpur and Sasaram following Mustafa's death in battle near Jagdishpur on 20 June 1745.Indecisive clashes ensued across Bihar and Bengal, culminating in Raghuji's defeat near Katwa in December 1745, forcing his retreat to Nagpur. Scattered Maratha detachments persisted in plundering western Bengal, while Orissa fell under the effective control of Mir Habib, a Maratha ally.

Determined to reclaim Orissa, Alivardi appointed Mir Jafar as deputy governor of the province and faujdar of Midnapore and Hijli. Mir Jafar departed Murshidabad in November 1746 and defeated Mir Habib's lieutenant Sayyid Nur near Midnapore. However, reinforcements under Janoji Bhonsle (Raghuji's son), combined with the treason of Mir Jafar and Ataullah Khan, stalled Bengal's recovery efforts. Undeterred despite his advanced age, Alivardi led an army personally against the Marathas. In a fiercely contested battle near Burdwan, the invaders were routed and fled to Midnapore. Alivardi withdrew to his capital to avoid the monsoon, allowing Maratha influence to resurge in Orissa up to Midnapore by 1747.

== Background ==
The massacre of Maratha generals in the previous invasion, ignited a burning desire for revenge in Raghuji's mind, who was looking for a chance to invade Bengal again. In February 1745, Alivardi's general Mustafa Khan openly rebelled against his master and invited Raghuji to raid Bengal territories to weaken Alivardi. Mustafa Khan's nephew Abdul Rasul Khan, the Naib Nazim of Orissa joined him at Patna. Alivardi appointed Durlabh Ram, son of his diwan Raja Jankiram in that post.

In February Raghuji left Nagpur to Orissa with a Maratha army of 14,000 cavalry. T. S. Shejwalkar writes the army strength 20,000 cavalry, 25,000 infantry and 300 guns.

== Maratha occupation of Odisha ==
Raghuji reached Orissa in March 1745. The governor of Cuttack, Rajah Durlabhram was busy with religious activities. His forces were wholly inadequate to offer resistance. The Nawab's absence in full strength in Bihar, where he was engaged against Mustafa, eliminated any prospect of reinforcements reaching Orissa. After shutting himself within Barabati Fort for a fortnight, Durlabh Ram imprudently ventured to Raghuji's camp, where he and his entourage were seized and taken prisoner. A lieutenant of Durlabh Ram named Mir Abdul Aziz defended the fort for a month with only 400 garrison. In May, he eventually surrendered on a condition where he along with his followers, kinsmen and property will not be harmed. Thus whole Orissa upto Midnapore was occupied by Marathas.

Alivardi who was buddy dealing with Afghan rebels in Bihar, received the news of Maratha invasion. To divert Raghuji's attention, Alivardi sent a false proposal of peace. Raghuji knowing his strength demanded three crore rupees for his slain generals. Alivardi postponed the proposals for almost two and a half months before Mustafa Khan, the leader of the Afghan rebels was slain at Jagdishpur on 20 June 1745.

== Raghuji's invasion of Bihar ==
In June Raghuji entered the district of Burdwan and on 20 July 1745, Raghuji advanced to Birbhum, from where he dispatched detachments to Cuttack, Midnapore, and Hijli.

=== Battle of Naubatpur ===
Around this period, Murtaza Khan, son of Mustafa Khan, Buland Khan, and other Afghan leaders, who had been enduring hardship in the mountains of Magror near Chainpur and Sasaram following Mustafa Khan's death, sent urgent appeals to Raghuji for assistance. Viewing their potential alliance as a means to bolster his forces, Raghuji marched toward Bihar in August. Traversing the jungles of northern Birbhum and the hills of Kharagpur (south of Monghyr), he arrived at Futwah, which he sacked and burned, before plundering Shaikhpura and additional villages within the Tikari estate. He then forded the Son River, rescued the Afghans, recrossed the river at Arwal, and proceeded toward Patna. With the Afghan alliance, his army grew to approximately 14,000–20,000 troops. Then they crossed Bhojpur, where the Raja was forced to pay wealth of one lakh rupee. After news of Nawab's march from Murshidabad reached the Raja immediately stopped paying tribute.

In October 1745, Alivardi Khan marched from Murshidabad with 12,000 cavalry to expel the Maratha-Afghan force advancing on Patna. The invaders withdrew southward, avoiding open battle while plundering villages. At Muhib–Alipur, Mir Jafar Khan and Shamshir Khan surprised Raghuji Bhonsle, briefly surrounding him; he escaped due to Shamshir Khan's negligence or bribery. Alivardi then engaged in 18 days of running combat, during which Raghuji was wounded in the mouth by gunfire. Marathas continued to fight for from 14 November till 20 November, before they began to flee.

=== Battle of Bhagalpur ===
After Alivardi's conflict with Martha's near Muhib Alipur, his Begum sent Taqi Ali Khan and Muzaffar with peace proposals, but Raghuji, advised by Mir Habib, rejected them and marched on defenceless Murshidabad to plunder it. Alivardi's army crossed the Son River amid severe supply shortages. Two of Zain-ud-Din's officers defected near Bhagalpur and fought against him. Turning toward Bengal via Maner and Patna, Alivardi was ambushed near Bhagalpur by Raghuji with 5,000–6,000 men. With only 600 troops, Alivardi charged fiercely, routing the Marathas with key support from Dost Muhammad Khan.

== Battle of Katwa ==
Fearing interception by Alivardi's forces on the main road, Raghuji marched from Bhagalpur through the hills and jungles of the Santal Parganas and Birbhum, reaching the vicinity of Murshidabad on 21 December 1745. The Marathas pillaged surrounding towns and villages, including Jhapaidah and Mir Jafar's garden, and raided the southern and western suburbs of the city for three to four days. Alivardi, traveling via the main road, arrived in Murshidabad on 22 December. Alivardi Khan promptly pursued Raghuji, who had withdrawn toward Katwa upon learning of the Nawab's approach. Alivardi overtook the Maratha forces at Ranidighi near Katwa, where a fierce engagement ensued. Raghuji suffered a decisive defeat, incurring heavy casualties and the loss of baggage, and was compelled to retreat to Nagpur empty handed.

=== Raghuji's retreat and Maratha raids ===
Raghuji left behind 2,000–3,000 Maratha cavalry and 4,000 or 6,000–7,000 Afghans, including Murtaza Khan and Buland Khan, under the command of Mir Habib to continue operations in Bengal. In 1746, roving Maratha bands remained active in Burdwan, Bankura, Midnapore, Cuttack, and Balasore, while Mir Habib effectively controlled nearly all of Orissa.

In early March 1746, Alivardi dispatched a force under Ataullah Khan to Burdwan, which successfully expelled the Marathas from the district. Alivardi personally proceeded to Burdwan, but with the enemy driven out of Bengal, he returned to his capital in April. Consequently, Bihar and Bengal were free of Marathas, although Orissa remained fully under Maratha control. Mir Habib maintained his position at Midnapore throughout the season and plundered Hijli, located at the mouth of the Ganges, along with its surrounding areas.

== Alivardi's Attempt to recover Odisha ==
Mir Habib, fearing attack from Alivardi, sought Raghuji's aid and offered 11 lakh rupees. Tempted, Raghuji planned to dispatch an army to Bengal under his son Janoji, led by Karande, Vagi, Gaekwad, and other Maratha chiefs. Troops mobilized in November 1746, but financial woes halted the expedition.

In November 1746, Alivardi Khan, unable to further postpone the reconquest of Orissa, appointed Mir Jafar Khan as bakhshi (paymaster) of the Bengal army and deputy governor of Orissa. Mir Jafar was additionally granted the faujdari of Midnapore and Hijli. He designated his cousin Mir Ismail (son of his maternal uncle) as acting bakhshi, appointed Subhan Singh as his deputy faujdar at Hijli, and departed Murshidabad with approximately 7,000–8,000 cavalry and 12,000 infantry to expel the Marathas. In early December, upon reaching Midnapore, Mir Jafar prompted a combined Maratha–Afghan force to withdraw toward Balasore. Advancing further, he defeated Sayyid Nur, lieutenant of Mir Habib, near Midnapore around 12 December 1746.

In January 1747, Mir Habib had encamped approximately two miles from Balasore with 8,000 cavalry and 20,000 infantry. Mir Habib was constructing batteries along the Barabaland River and mounting cannon on vessels, intending to resist the Nawab's forces.

== Aftermath ==
Mir Habib was soon joined by a Maratha force under Janoji Bhonsle, the son of Raghuji Bhonsle which had marched from Nagpur via Cuttack. Upon learning of this convergence of hostile forces, Mir Jafar hastily withdrew to Burdwan, abandoning the Midnapore district. In January 1747, Mir Habib encamped near Balasore and soon was reinforced by Raghuji's son Janoji. This sparked considerable apprehension in Mir Jafar. Despite commanding a force of 20,000 men, he hastily withdrew from Midnapore to Burdwan. Alivardi Khan sharply reprimanded Mir Jafar Khan for this ignominious retreat and dispatched a substantial reinforcement to Burdwan under Ataullah Khan and Fakhrullah Beg Khan. The combined forces engaged in an inconclusive battle with Janoji and Mir Habib. Shortly thereafter, a plot involving Mir Jafar and Ataullah Khan, the faujdar of Rajmahal, to assassinate their patron and kinsman Alivardi Khan was uncovered; both conspirators were promptly dismissed from their positions. Alivardi himself led campaign against Marathas. In March he defeated Janoji near Burdwan.

Throughout the entire 1747 A.D, Orissa upto Midnapore still remained under Maratha control.

== See also ==
- First Maratha invasion of Bengal
- Second Maratha invasion of Bengal

== Bibliography ==
- Datta, Kalikinkar (1939). Alivardi and His Times. University of Calcutta.
- Sarkar, Jadunath (1964). Fall of The Mughal Empire 1739-1754. Vol. I (3rd ed.). Orient Longman Ltd.
- Sardesai, Govind Sakharam (1946). New History Of The Marathas. Vol. II. Bombay: Phoenix Publications.
- Sarkar, Jadunath (1943). The History of Bengal. Vol. II. Ramna, Dhaka: The University of Dhaka.
- Datta, K. K. (1978). "Bengal Subah (1707-1756)". In Banerjee, A.C.; Ghase, D. K. (eds.). A Comprehensive History of India: 1712-1772, edited by A. C. Banerjee and D. K. Ghase. People's Publishing House.
- Rahim, M. A. (1971). Rahim, M. A; Abdul Momin, Chowdhury; Mahmood, A. B Mahiuddin; Islam, Sirajul (eds.). Bangladesher Itihas [Bangladesh's History] (in Bengali) (1st ed.). Dhaka: M. Alam Iden Press. pp. 285–305.
- Shejwalkar, T. S. (1941). "The Bengal Episode in Maratha History". Bulletin of the Deccan College Research Institute. 2 (3/4): 361–382. ISSN 0045-9801.
- Banerji, R. D. (1951). History of Orissa. Vol. II. Calcutta: Prabasi Press.
- Ray, Bhabani Charan (1960). Orissa Under Marathas, 1751-1803. Kitab Mahal. Archived from the original on 2024-01-21.
- Thakur, Upendra (1958). "Alivardi and the Afghans of Tirhut". Proceedings of the Indian History Congress. 21: 376–392. ISSN 2249-1937.
- Mishra, Shree Govind. History of Bihar, 1740-1772. Lawrence Verry Incorporated. ISBN 978-0-8426-0172-6.
