= Bargis =

Light cavalry mercenary group in India

- Founded: Unknown
- Named after: Hindustani word for "light cavalry"
- Founding location: Indian subcontinent
- Years active: Unknown
- Territory: Indian subcontinent
- Membership: Unknown
- Activities: Maratha invasions of Bengal
- Allies: Nagpur Kingdom; Maratha Confederacy
- Rivals: Mughal Empire; Bengal Subah; Durrani Emirate; Company Raj

Bargis (Bengali: বর্গি) were a light cavalry mercenary group of Maratha Confederacy's who indulged in large scale depredations in the countryside of western part of the Bengal Subah for about ten years (1741–1751) during the Maratha invasions of Bengal. Maratha invasions took place almost as an annual event for 10 years.

== Etymology ==
According to historians the term bargi (or in Common Bengali "borgi") comes from the Hindustani word bargir, which described cavalry whose equipment and horses were provided by the government. The bargi were distinct from the shiledars, who owned their equipment and horses. Bargi are also known as Jogi or Gosain in Eastern Bundelkhand region.

== History ==
Alivardi Khan became Nawab of Bengal in April 1740 by defeating and killing Sarfaraz Khan. His seizure of power was challenged by Sarfaraz Khan's brother-in-law Rustam Jung, who enlisted the backing of Raghoji I Bhonsle, the Maratha King of Nagpur. Historians writes that in the ensuing campaign, the Marathas "discovered the Bengal's rich countryside through lightning raids". Maratha cavalry pillaged the army of the Nawab on being requested by Rustam Jung. In April 1742, they crossed the Damodar River at Panchet and began plundering and burning the army of the Nawab. The Maratha Ditch was built by the British East India Company around Fort William to protect the city of Calcutta from the ruthless Bargi raids.

For about ten years, the Bargis raided and plundered the army of the Nawab, every year. Contemporary sources describe the ineffectiveness of the Nawab's army in the face of the Bargis' hit-and-run tactics. The raiders' aim was not battle or conquest, but to plunder the Nawab's territories.

Alivardi's soldiers could not match the Maratha horsemen in speed and maneuverability. Only the Ganges-Bhagirathi river line restrained them. They crossed it to raid eastern Bengal only a few times.

The Bargi invasions ended in May 1751 when the Nawab and the Marathas made peace.

The Bargi remained in the cultural memory of the Bengali people in the form of songs and poems. One traditional lullaby "Child sleeps, Neighbourhood sleeps" ("Khoka ghumalo, para juralo"), translated, reads:

When the children fall asleep, silence sets in, the bargis come to our lands
Bulbuls have eaten the grains, how shall I pay the khajna (tax)?

== Atrocities ==
The Maratha soldiers invaded and occupied western Bengal up to the Hooghly River. During that period of invasion by the Marathas, mercenaries called as "bargis", perpetrated atrocities against the local population, against Bengali Hindus and Biharis. As reported in Burdwan Estate's and European sources, the Bargis are said to have plundered villages, and Jan Kersseboom, chief of the Dutch East India Company factory in Bengal, estimated that perhaps 400,000 civilians in Western Bengal and Bihar were dead owing to the invasion of Bargis. The resulting casualties of Bargi onslaught against in Bengal are considered to be among the deadliest massacres in Indian history. According to the 18th-century Bengali text Maharashtra Purana written by Gangaram:

They shouted over and over again, 'Give us money', and when they got no money they filled peoples' nostrils with water, and some they seized and drowned in tanks, and many died of suffocation. In this way they did all manner of foul and evil deeds. When they demanded money and it was not given to them, they would put the man to death. Those who had money gave it, those who had none were killed.

According to the Bengali text Maharashtra Purana:

Durga ordered her followers to be gracious to the Muslim Nawab and oppose the Marathas, because the evil-minded ones had killed Brahmans and Vaisnavas.

This devastated Bengal's economy, as many of the people killed in the Bargi raids included merchants, textile weavers, silk winders, and mulberry cultivators. The Cossimbazar factory reported in 1742, for example, that the Bargis burnt down many of the houses where silk piece goods were made, along with weavers' looms.

British historian Robert Orme reported that the Marathas caused so much distress to the local population that many of them "were continually taking flight" in large numbers to Calcutta whenever they heard rumours of the Marathas coming. Many of the Bengali Hindus in western Bengal also fled to take shelter in eastern Bengal, fearing for their lives in the wake of the Maratha attacks.

The further attacks took place in 1748 in Bihar, on Murshidabad in 1750, and in 1751 in Western Bengal.

The internal fights within the Alivardi Khan's military also contributed to their losses. For example, in 1748 Pathan soldiers rebelled and seized Patna which they controlled for some time. Another example is the Faujdar of Purnea who departed from Alivardi and created a small autonomous state. Apart from territorial losses, the Nawab of Bengal also suffered severe economic losses. Industries such as agriculture and trade were dislocated and a large number of people migrated from Western Bengal to Northern and Eastern districts.

== See also ==
- Maratha Ditch
- Bengal Subah
- Pindari
