= Maharashta Purana =

Chronicle of the Maratha invasions of Bengal

Maharashta Purana is a contemporary poetic chronicle of the Maratha invasions of Bengal.

== Manuscript ==
=== Discovery ===
Manuscript of the Maharashtra Purana

Kedarnath Majumdar came across the palm-leaf manuscript — in eleven folios — while collecting biographies of regional poets in Mymensingh c. 1902. It remains the only extant manuscript and is currently conserved at the Manuscript Library of the Bengali Department of the University of Calcutta.

=== Editions ===
In 1908, Byomakesh Mustafi edited the text for the first time; it was published in Sahitya Parishat Patrika with an introduction and accompanying notes. (Note: Mustafi's edition can be read here.) In 1924, Prof. J. N. Samaddar of Patna University published an abridged translation in English with a brief introduction and notes. In 1930, T. C. Dasgupta re-translated the chronicle to English, for a journal published by the University of Calcutta. (Note: The translation can be read here.) An improved English translation—alongside a critical transliteration and commentary—was published by Edward C. Dimock and Pratul Chandra Gupta in 1965 from the University of Hawaiʻi Press.

=== Dating ===
A date in the Bengali calendar—Sanibar, 14th of Pous, saka 1672, sala 1158 (29 December 1751)—is mentioned in the colophon; it might have been the date of completion of composition by the author or the completion of copying by the scribe but provides the terminus ante quem. From the text's conclusion with the death of Bhaskar Ram Kolhatkar (d. March 1744), a terminus post quem of c. 1745 can be imposed.

== Author ==
The Purana was written by Gangaram Dev Chowdhury, a Hindu Kayastha from Dharishwar village who served as a scribe for the local Muslim zamindar, among his other works were Shuk Sambad and Labkush Charitra.

== Genre ==
A long narrative poem of 716 lines, the meters vary in accordance with the context; despite the name, there is no significant resemblance to the eponymous epical genre. Kumkum Chatterjee locates the text as part of the Mangal-Kāvya corpus; however, Dimock and Gupta held it as a "text of pure secular history."

== Content ==
The raids are covered from their start till the assassination of Bhaskar Pandit. That the last line of the manuscript reads "Thus ends the first part of Maharashtra Puran [...], called Bhaskara-Parahaba", it has been suggested that Gangaram might have had drafted successor volumes.

== Legacy ==
The text remains among the only few works of contemporary vernacular literature to describe the Maratha raids; (Note: Apart from Vanesvara Vidyalankara's Citracampu, Dimock and Gupta can only cite the occasional nursery-rhyme or the odd ballad.) as such, it has been used by historians like Jadunath Sarkar and others to document the history of Marathas and Bengal. Tapan Raychaudhuri uses its example to argue that the premodern literary culture in Bengal did not register any memory of the Islamic Rule in Bengal as uniquely oppressive or tyrannical — such emotional affects would be only produced during the Indian independence movement in service of constructing an imagined national identity around Hinduism.

== Bibliography ==
- Gangaram (1965). The Mahārāshṭa Purāṇa: An Eighteenth-Century Bengali Historical Text. Translated by Dimock, Edward C.; Gupta, Pratul Chandra. University of Hawaii Press. doi:10.1515/9780824885892. ISBN 9780824885892.
- H., S. N. (April–June 1968). "Review of The Mahārāshtra Purāṇa, An Eighteenth-Century Bengali Historical Text, by Edward C. Dimock, and Pratul Chandra Gupta". Journal of the American Oriental Society. 88 (2): 384. doi:10.2307/597345. ISSN 0003-0279. JSTOR 597345.
- Raychaudhuri, Tapan (2000). "The Mughal Empire in the Bengali Literary Tradition". Journal of Islamic Studies. 11 (3): 320–334. doi:10.1093/jis/11.3.320. ISSN 0955-2340. JSTOR 26198198.
- গঙ্গারাম বিরচিত মহারাষ্টাপুরাণ. Anandabajar Patrika (in Bengali). 21 July 2019.
- Chatterjee, Kumkum (2009). The Cultures of History in Early Modern India Persianization and Mughal Culture in Bengal. Oxford University Press. doi:10.1093/acprof:oso/9780195698800.001.0001. ISBN 9780195698800.
