= Maratha Ditch =

Road in Calcutta, India

- Kolkata, West Bengal, India
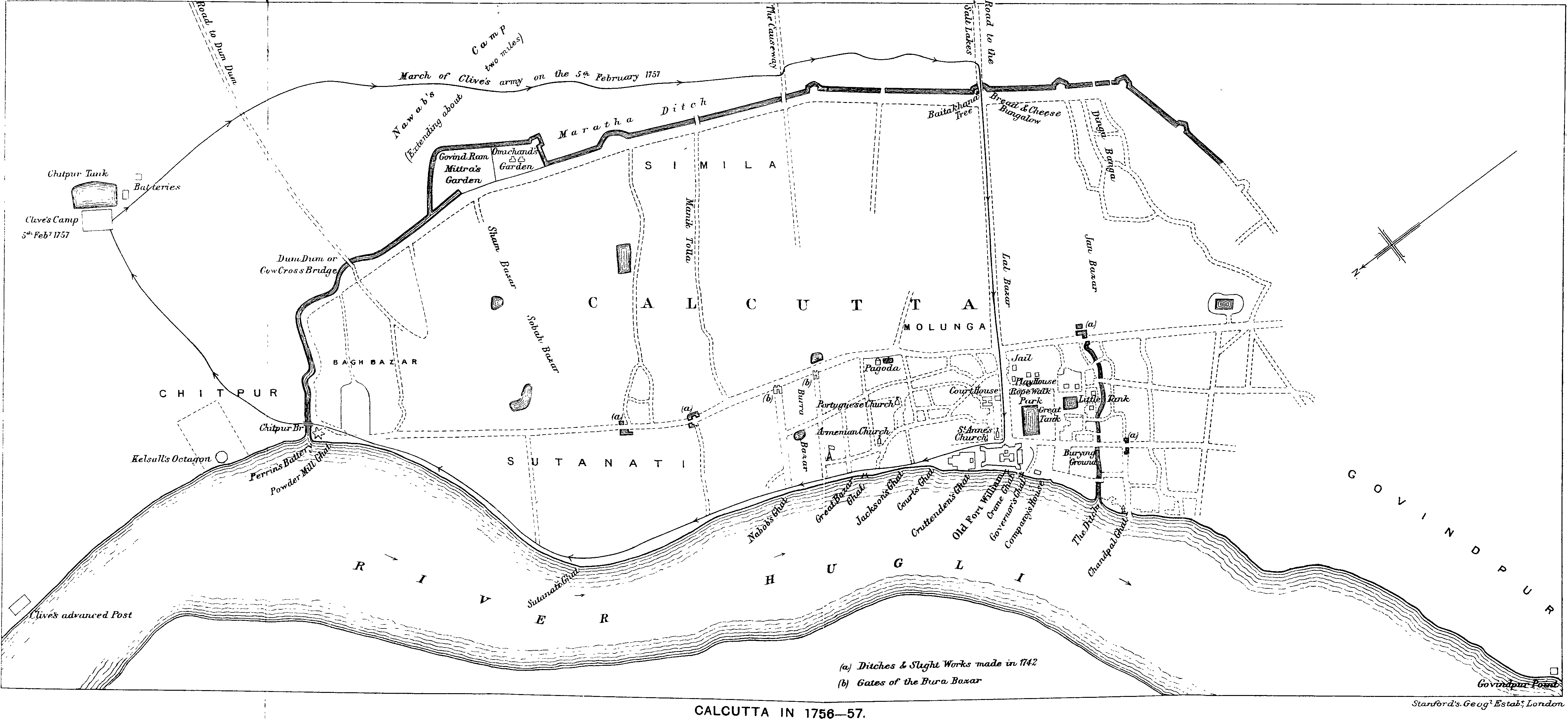
- The Maratha Ditch is on the boundary of Calcutta city, circling Omichund's and Gobindram Mitter's mansions

Site information
- Type: Entrenchment
- Controlled by: British East India Company (1757–1858)

Site history
- Built: 1793
- Battles/wars: Maratha invasions of Bengal

The Maratha Ditch was a three-mile-long deep entrenchment constructed by the English East India Company around Fort William in Calcutta. It was built to protect the surrounding villages and forts from the Maratha attacks. The ditch marked the outer limits of Calcutta city in the nineteenth century.

== History ==
During the Maratha invasions of Bengal, the mercenaries employed by the Marathas of Nagpur. In 1742, the president of the East India Company in Bengal petitioned the nawab Alivardi Khan to create an entrenchment intended to circle the landward sides of Calcutta. This request was immediately granted by Alivardi Khan, and in 1743 the Indians and Europeans co-operated to excavate a 3-mile-long ditch north of Fort William, which came to be known as the Maratha Ditch.

However, the threat of Maratha invasions ceased before the ditch could be completed and it was left unfinished. Subsequently, it marked the outer limits of Calcutta during the 19th century. After that, it became more or less useless as a defensive work, since the deteriorated ditch could only make the movement of troops and artillery significantly difficult.

The ditch was partly paved in 1799 for the Circular Road of Calcutta and was completely filled in 1893 for construction of the Harrison Road. Today, a road in North Kolkata by the name of Maratha Ditch Lane marks where the entrenchment once stood.
