= Third Maratha invasion of Bengal =

Maratha invasion of Bengal Subah (1744)

- Part of Maratha invasions of Bengal
Date	early March – 31 March 1744
Location	Bengal Subah (in part of West Bengal)
Result	Bengal Subah victory
Territorial changes	Status quo ante bellum

Belligerents
Bengal Subah	Maratha Empire; Kingdom of Nagpur

Commanders and leaders
Alivardi Khan; Mir Jafar; Mustafa Khan; Mirza Beg Khan; Saulat Jang; Ataullah Khan; Mir Qasim Khan; Haider Ali Khan; Mirza Dawar Quli; Fakrullah Beg Khan; Mirza Hakim Beg; Bar Khordar Beg; Umar Khan	Bhaskar Ram Kolhatkar X Alibhai Qarawwal X Shahamat Khan X Raghuji Gaikwad; Mir Habib

Strength
Unknown	20,000 cavalry

Casualties and losses
Negligible	22 out of 23 Maratha generals including Bhaskar killed

In early March 1744, Alivardi Khan, the Nawab of Bengal, faced a Maratha invasion led by Bhaskar Pandit and Alibhai Qarawwal. With his army exhausted, treasury depleted, and health failing, Alivardi opted for deceit over open battle. He sent sweet messages and gifts to Bhaskar, tricking him into a meeting at Mankara on March 31 with minimal guards. There, Alivardi ordered the murder of Bhaskar and his generals. Leaderless, the Maratha troops were attacked by Alivardi’s Afghan generals, with many killed or driven out of Bengal. Surviving Maratha bands fled in disarray, and the entire Maratha force abandoned the province. Alivardi returned to Murshidabad and distributed ten lakhs of rupees as rewards to his soldiers.

== Background ==
After the second Maratha invasion in 1743 AD, The Bengal Subah enjoyed peace from June 1743 to February 1744.

On August 31, 1743, the two Maratha chiefs met at King Shahu's court, where, a compromise was enforced. The Peshwa was granted the four subahs of Malwa, Agra, Ajmer, and Allahabad, along with Tikari and Bhojpur (including Daudnagar) in Bihar territory west of Patna and east of Allahabad, yielding 12 lakhs of rupees annually. Raghuji Bhonsle received the subahs of Bengal (including Odisha) and Oudh in full, plus all of Bihar except the mahals yielding 12 lakhs reserved for the Peshwa. Each was strictly prohibited from encroaching on the other's territory. In early March 1744, Raghuji dispatched Bhaskar Pandit and Alibhai Qarawwal, a Muslim convert at the head of 20,000 cavalry. The army invaded Bengal via Odisha and Midnapore. Enraged by his losses of booty and camp property abandoned during his retreat from Katwa on September 27, 1742, and his expulsion from Bengal by Balaji Baji Rao in April 1743, he was driven by vengeance. While the Peshwa had extracted 22 lakhs of rupees from the province, Bhaskar had gained nothing despite his heavy expenditure. Thus, in his third campaign, Bhaskar unleashed brutal ferocity, and the Nagpur troops ravaged the countryside.

== Massacre of Maratha generals ==
The Nawab felt betrayed by the Peshwa's broken promise and abandonment. Furious at the Marathas’ deceit, he resolved to use similar ways against the Marathas. Due to his poor health and financial instability of his kingdom Alivardi decided to avoid another grueling campaign against the Marathas in the intense summer. Instead he sought a stratagem to massacre the Maratha generals to evade further conflict.

=== Preparations ===
In 1744, Alivardi Khan, devised a plan to counter the persistent Maratha invasions led by Bhaskar Pandit. Consulting his trusted Afghan general, Ghulam Mustafa Khan, the Nawab agreed to a strategy proposed by Mustafa, who offered to lure Bhaskar and his chief officers to a friendly meeting and eliminate them, in exchange for the governorship of Bihar. The plan was prepared in utmost secrecy. Bhaskar's forces that year included twenty Maratha generals and two Muslim commanders, Shahamat Khan and Alibhai Qarawwal. To execute the plan, Alivardi dispatched his diwan, Rajah Janakiram, and Mustafa Khan to Bhaskar's camp at Dignagar while he himself encamped at Mankara. (Note: Situated between Amaniganj and Katwa) The envoys conveyed the Nawab's desire to resolve the ongoing conflicts by agreeing to an annual chauth to be determined through mutual discussion, necessitating a personal meeting between the two leaders.

=== Massacre at Mankara ===
Mir Habib warned Bhaskar of Nawabs agents but Janakiram and Mustafa swore solemn oaths, according to Hindu and Muslim traditions respectively, assuring Bhaskar's party of safety during the visit.

On March 31, Alivardi entered a tent with Saulat Jang, Ataullah Khan, and Mir Qasim Khan, leaving troops nearby. Mir Jafar Khan guarded the tent's gate with soldiers, Haider Ali Khan monitored the Maratha approach route, and Mirza Dawar Quli positioned artillery nearby. Hidden soldiers flanked the tent. Alivardi shared his plan with Saulat Jang, Ataullah Khan, Mir Jafar Khan, and Fakrullah Beg Khan, instructing them to stand armed in two rows inside. Many curious onlookers gathered. Convinced, Bhaskar agreed to the meeting, which was scheduled for March 31, 1744, the second day of the Bengali New Year. The designated location for the meeting was the plain of Mankara, approximately four miles south of the modern Berhampur Cantonment station. On March 31, Bhaskar arrived at Mankara, though parts of his army remained stationed at Katwa and Palashi. Accompanied by 21 generals and approximately 20 lower-ranking attendants, Bhaskar proceeded on foot to the large tent set up for the interview. He stationed 15,000–20,000 Maratha soldiers at a distance. Notably absent was Raghuji Gaikwad, a Maratha general who harbored suspicions of Alivardi's intentions and remained behind, citing illness. At the tent's entrance, Bhaskar was greeted by Janakiram and Mustafa Khan. As the Maratha party advanced along the carpeted floor toward. Mirza Hakim Beg presented Bhaskar to the Nawab, who, after confirming his identity three times, signaled his hidden soldiers to attack. Mir Qasim Khan, Bar Khordar Beg, and others charged Bhaskar and his generals. Mir Qasim Khan killed Bhaskar with a single sword stroke, and his generals were quickly killed. Mustafa Khan and Umar Khan attacked the leaderless Maratha soldiers, killing many. Hidden soldiers emerged from the tent's wings, surrounding the Maratha contingent. After a brief struggle, Bhaskar and his entire party were killed. As the massacre unfolded, Alivardi exited through the tent's rear, joined his troops, and ordered an assault on Bhaskar's escort outside. Leaderless, the escort fled without resistance.

== Aftermath ==
Raghuji Gaikwad, the sole surviving Maratha general, escaped with his contingent of 10,000 cavalry at the onset of the chaos, retreating to the camps at Palashi and Katwa. From there, he swiftly departed for Nagpur with his troops and as much baggage as could be quickly gathered. Maratha forces scattered across Bengal and Odisha fled to Nagpur, effectively ending their presence in the region.

Alivardi rewarded his troops with a bounty of ten lakhs of rupees. At his recommendation, the Mughal Emperor granted promotions and titles to the officers of the Bengal army, solidifying Alivardi's control over the region. In 1745, Alivardi faced mutiny of his Afghan generals in Bihar.

== Bibliography ==
- Datta, Kalikinkar (1939). Alivardi and His Times. University of Calcutta.
- Sarkar, Jadunath (1964). Fall Of The Mughal Empire 1739-1754. Vol. I (3rd ed.). Orient Longman Ltd.
- Sardesai, Govind Sakharam (1946). New History Of The Marathas. Vol. II. Bombay: Phoenix Publications.
- Sarkar, Jadunath (1943). The History of Bengal. Vol. II. Ramna, Dhaka: The University of Dhaka.
- Mehta, Jaswant Lal (2005). Advanced Study in the History of Modern India 1707-1813. Sterling Publishers Pvt. Ltd. ISBN 978-1-932705-54-6.
- Datta, K. K. (1978). "Bengal Subah (1707-1756)". In Banerjee, A.C.; Ghase, D. K. (eds.). A Comprehensive History of India: 1712-1772, edited by A. C. Banerjee and D. K. Ghase. People's Publishing House.
- Bhattacharya, Sabyasachi, ed. (2020). A Comprehensive History of Modern Bengal, 1700-1950. Vol. I. Kolkata: The Asiatic Society. ISBN 978-93-89901-95-5.
- Malik, Zahiruddin (1977). The Reign of Muhammad Shah, 1719-1748. Asia Publishing House. ISBN 978-0-210-40598-7.
