= Bhaskar Ram Kolhatkar =

18th century Indian general and statesman

Pandit Baba Bhaskar Ram Kolhatkar
- Born: Maratha Empire
- Died: 30 March 1744; Mankara, Bengal Subah
- Relatives: Narayan Ramaji (father); Konher Ram (brother)
- Military career
- Allegiance: Maratha Empire: Nagpur state
- Service years: 18th century
- Commands: Dewan (Finance Minister) of Nagpur state under Raghuji Bhonsle I
- Conflicts: Ratanpur (1740); Maratha invasions of Bengal; First invasion (1742); Second invasion (1743); Third invasion (1744) X

Bhaskar Ram Kolhatkar, known as Baba Bhaskar Pandit or Bhaskar Pant by the people of Bengal and Maharashtra, was a Maratha general and statesman. He was the dewan (Finance Minister) of the Maharaja of Nagpur, Raghuji Bhonsle. He played an important role in the kingdom of Nagpur's expansion. The first Maratha invasion of Bengal in 1741, as also the third in 1744, was led by him. He was an able military leader, proven by his success in the Maratha invasions of Bengal and conquest of Chhattisgarh. He was killed by Alivardi Khan on 30 March 1744.

== Early life ==
Bhaskar Ram was born to one Narayan Ramaji and his brother was Konher Ram.

== Military career ==
=== Invasion of Bengal ===
Raghuji Bhonsle sent him with a strong force to Bengal to collect chauth (tribute) from the Nawab of Bengal for the first time in 1741, and for the second time in 1744. By 1742, he bought Orissa under his control with the help of Mir Habib, formerly in the service of Alivardi Khan, and captured the neighborhood of Calcutta and Hughli.

=== Conquest of Chhattisgarh ===
The Bhonsle Maratha armies passed through Chhattisgarh on their way to invade the Odia kingdoms in eastern India. Bhaskar Pant invaded the Haihaiyavanshi Kingdom at the close of 1740. According to Sir Charles Grant, his army is said to have consisted of 40,000 men, chiefly horse. The branch Haihaiyavanshi ruler of Raipur, Amar Singh, did not oppose him. However, the Haihaiyavanshi ruler of Ratanpur, Raghunath Singh offered resistance by shutting himself in his fort. According to Sir Charles Grant, Raghunath Singh was bowed down with a heavy sorrow, which was the loss of his only son. He refused to take any interest in the government for nearly a year. At best, he was a feeble man, but now worn out with years and afflicted in mind. The raja made no effort to defend his kingdom and waited till Bhaskar Pant reached his capital. Even then, there was no resistance from the defenders. Bhaskar Pant bought his guns to play on the fort, and soon a part of the palace was in ruins. At this point, one of the Ranis (queen) named Laxmi hoisted a white flag on the ramparts of the fort. The gates for opened, and the invading Marathas entered the fort and looted the city.

A fine of one lakh rupees was imposed on the town and all the wealth that remained in the treasury was seized. Then the country was pillaged in all directions by the Maratha army. However, Raghunath Singh was not harmed in any manner and allowed to rule at Ratanpur under the suzerainty of the Marathas. Having crushed the Haihaiyavanshi king, the nominal overlord of the many petty chieftains and surrounding states, the Marathas demanded that the petty rulers submit to them, and the rulers did.

Raigarh fell to the Bhonsles in 1741, and by 1742 Maratha control over the kingdom was firmly established.

== Assassination ==
Alivardi Khan invited Bhaskar and other Maratha leaders to entertainment at Mankara, near Katwa in a large tent. They were not aware of the assassins in the shadows, whom Alivardi Khan had employed. The assassins rushed out and killed all of the 21 Maratha leaders. The head of Bhaskar Pant was bought before Alivardi Khan. This turn of events enraged Raghuji and he conducted brutal annual raids into Bengal, until 1751.

The Bargi dacoits led by Bhaskar Pant into Bengal caused so much destruction that lullabies were composed in which mothers would use the fear of a Maratha raid to get their children to go to sleep. These poems are popular amongst Bengalis even today, one traditional song translated is as follows:

When the children fall asleep, silence sets in, the Bargis come to our lands

Bulbuls have eaten the grains, how shall I pay the nawabs tax demands?
