= Naubatpur =

Indian town in Patna, Bihar

- City
- Nickname: Greater Patna
- Location in Bihar, India
- Coordinates: 25°30′00″N 84°57′40″E
- Country: India
- State: Bihar
- Region: Magadh
- Metropolis: Patna Metropolitan Region
- District: Patna
- Elevation: 58 m (190 ft)

Population (2011)
  - Total: 25,011

Languages
  - Official: Hindi, Magadhi
- Time zone: UTC+5:30 (IST)
- PIN: 801109
- Telephone code: +91612
- ISO 3166 code: IN-BR
- Vehicle registration: BR-01
- Sex ratio: 1000/892 ♂/♀
- Climate: ETh (Köppen)
- Precipitation: 1,000 millimetres (39 in)

Naubatpur is a satellite town in Patna Metropolitan Region located inside Patna district within the Indian state of Bihar.

== Geography ==
It is located 15 km west of Patna. The nearest airport is the Patna Airport, 18.5 km NorthEast of the town.

== History ==
Naubatpur is a small suburb on the south-west outskirts of Patna, Bihar. This small locality is surrounded by agricultural lands and orchards. Due to new upcoming projects such as UB Group Beer Factory, National Highway 139,78 and All India Institute of Medical Science at Phulwari Sharif, people are moving their profession from agriculture to business and service sectors. There are many small villages attached to this small city. In coming years this area has become more populated due to AIIMS of Phulwari Sharif and other agriculture sectors. Naubatpur is one of the biggest blocks in entire Patna with maximum number of Panchayat. Birthplace of former CPI(M) leader late shree ram nath yadav

== Schools and colleges ==
(partial list)

- Kids Home School
- Cambridge Public School
- Sai Sadhna School
- Maltidhari College
- Gyan Bharti Educational complex
- Jagdeo Memorial High School (Arap)

== List of villages ==
The list of villages in Naubatpur Block (under Danapur Tehsil) is as follows:

- Abgilla
- Adla
- Ajwan
- Amarpura
- Aropur
- Babupur
- Badi Tegharaila
- Bara
- Bichhedi
- Birpur
- Chechoul
- Chara
- Chesi
- Chirora
- Dariyapur
- Dewra
- Dihra
- Faridpur
- Ganawan
- Gopalpur
- Ibrahimpur
- Jaitipur
- Jamalpura
- Janipur
- Karanja Gowai
- Khajuri
- Kopa
- Kopakalan
- Korawan
- Lodipur
- Motipur
- Makhdumpur
- Maksudpur
- Naharpura
- Nawdiha
- Nawhi
- Neva
- Niserpura
- Nizampur
- Parsa
- Parsotimpur
- Rampur
- Raunian
- Rustamganj
- Samanpura
- Savar Chak
- Sarasat
- Shirwar
- Sheikhpura
- Taret
- Tilhwan

=== Notable Gram Panchayats ===
Dariyapur is a Gram Panchayat in Naubatpur block. According to the 2011 Census of India, Dariyapur had a population of 4,284.
