= Barabati fort =

Barabati Fort
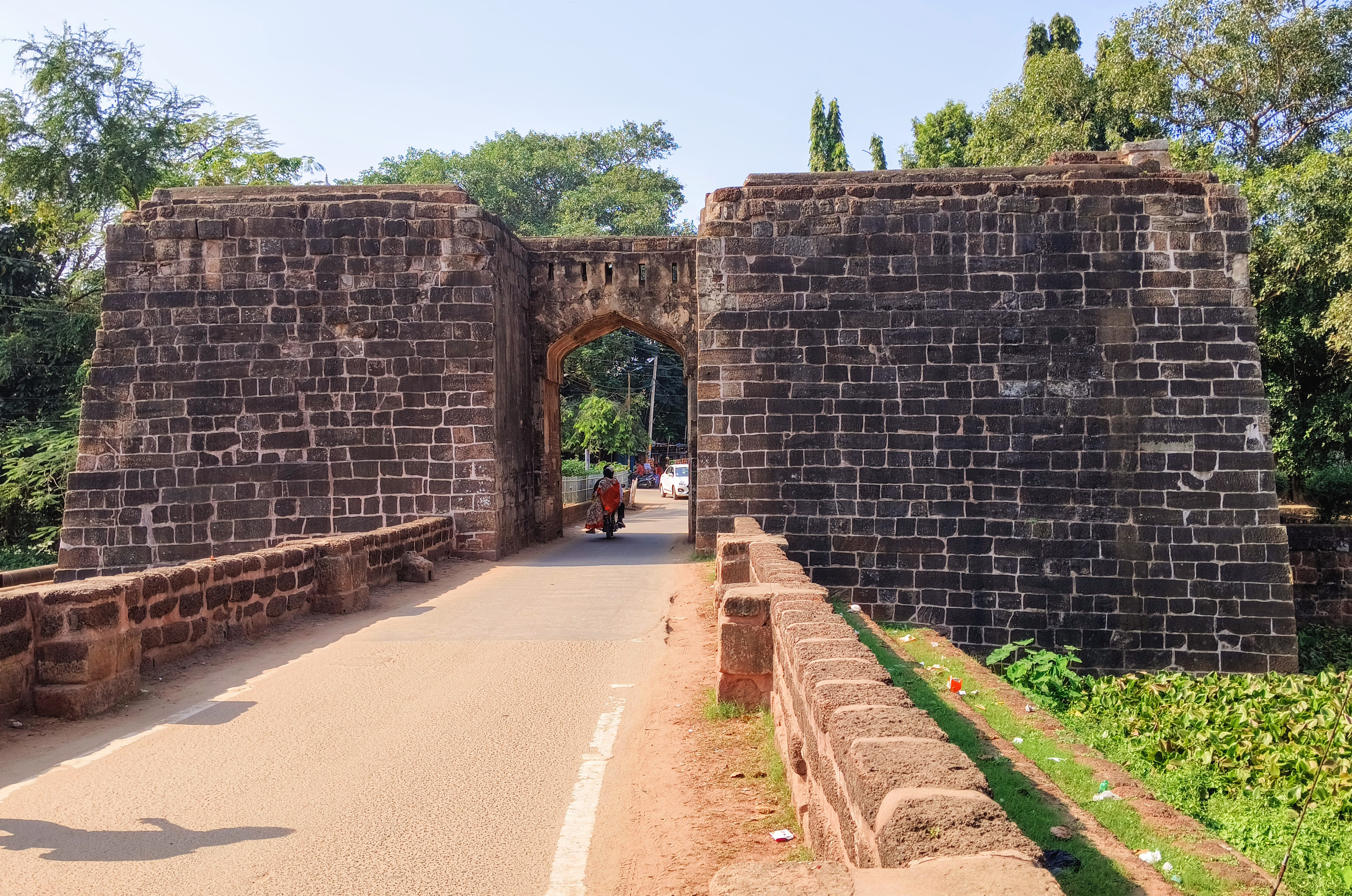
- Entrance of Barabati fort

- Location of the fort in Odisha
- 20°29′4.67″N 85°51′51.93″E
- Type: Fort
- Location: Cuttack

History
- Founder: Old fort by Marakata Keshari of Somavamshi (Keshari) dynasty New fort by King Anangabhima Deva III of Eastern Ganga dynasty (1211-1238)
- Built: 989 CE

Site notes
- Height: 14.62 metres (48.0 ft)

Monument of National Importance
- Official name: Barabati fort
- Reference no.: N-OR-6
- Collection circle: Odisha

Barabati Fort is a 987 CE fort built by Marakata Keshari of Somavanshi (Keshari) dynasty in Cuttack, Odisha. The ruins of the fort remain with its moat, gate, and the earthen mound of the nine-storied palace.

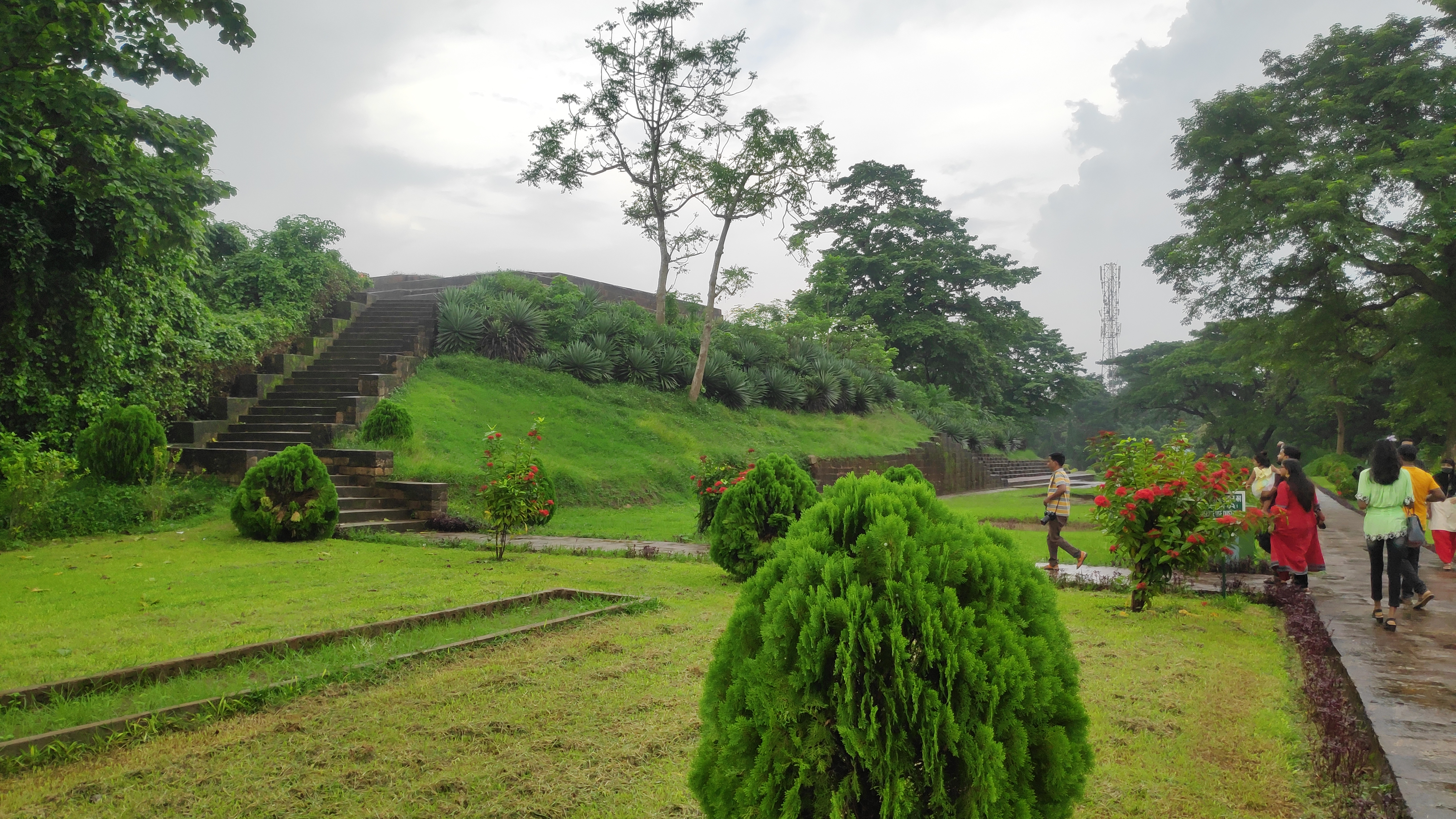
Barabati fort

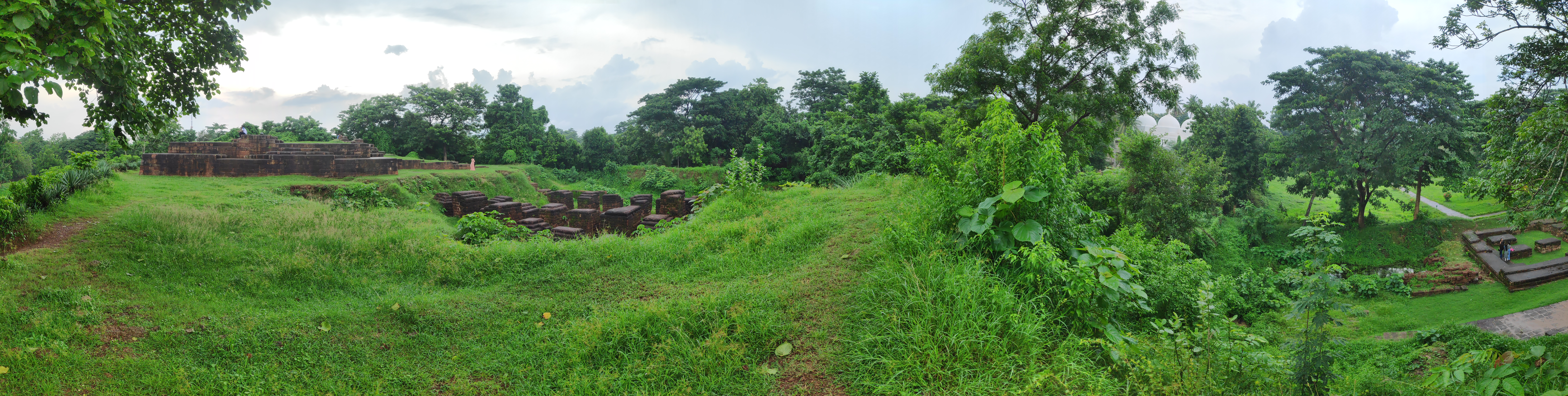
Panoramic view of Barabati fort

== Location ==
This medieval fort is situated at 20°29′1.32″N 85°52′3.36″E, about 8 km from the center of the Cuttack, at the apex of a delta formed by the river Mahanadi in the north and its distributary, the Kathajodi in the south, and is located at 14.62 metres above sea level.

== History ==
The Barabati was built in 987 CE by the Somavamshi dynasty.

In 1568 AD, the city was taken over by the Karranis of Bengal, then by the Mughal Empire in 1576. and then to the Maratha Empire in 1741.

== Architecture ==
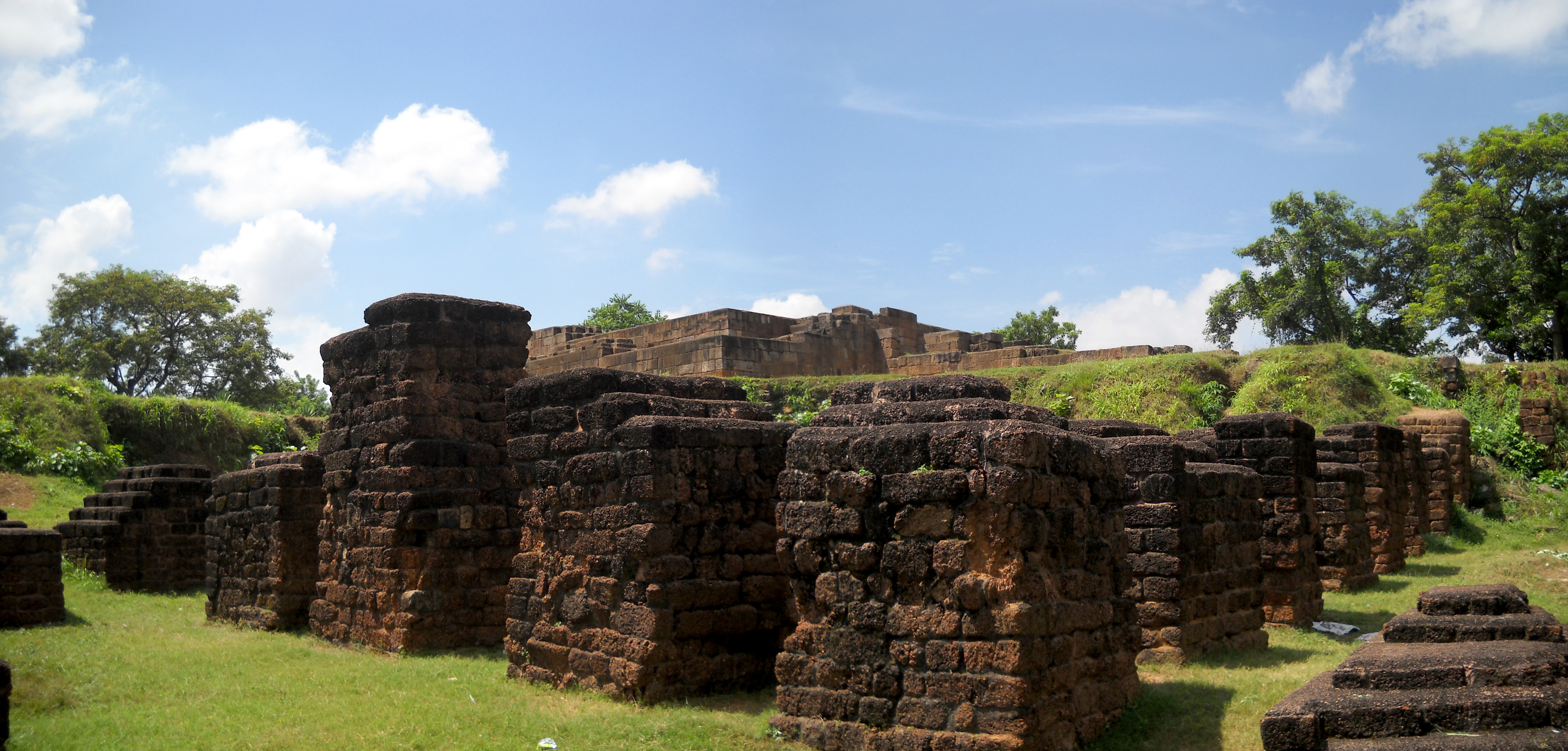
Bastions and ramparts of the fort

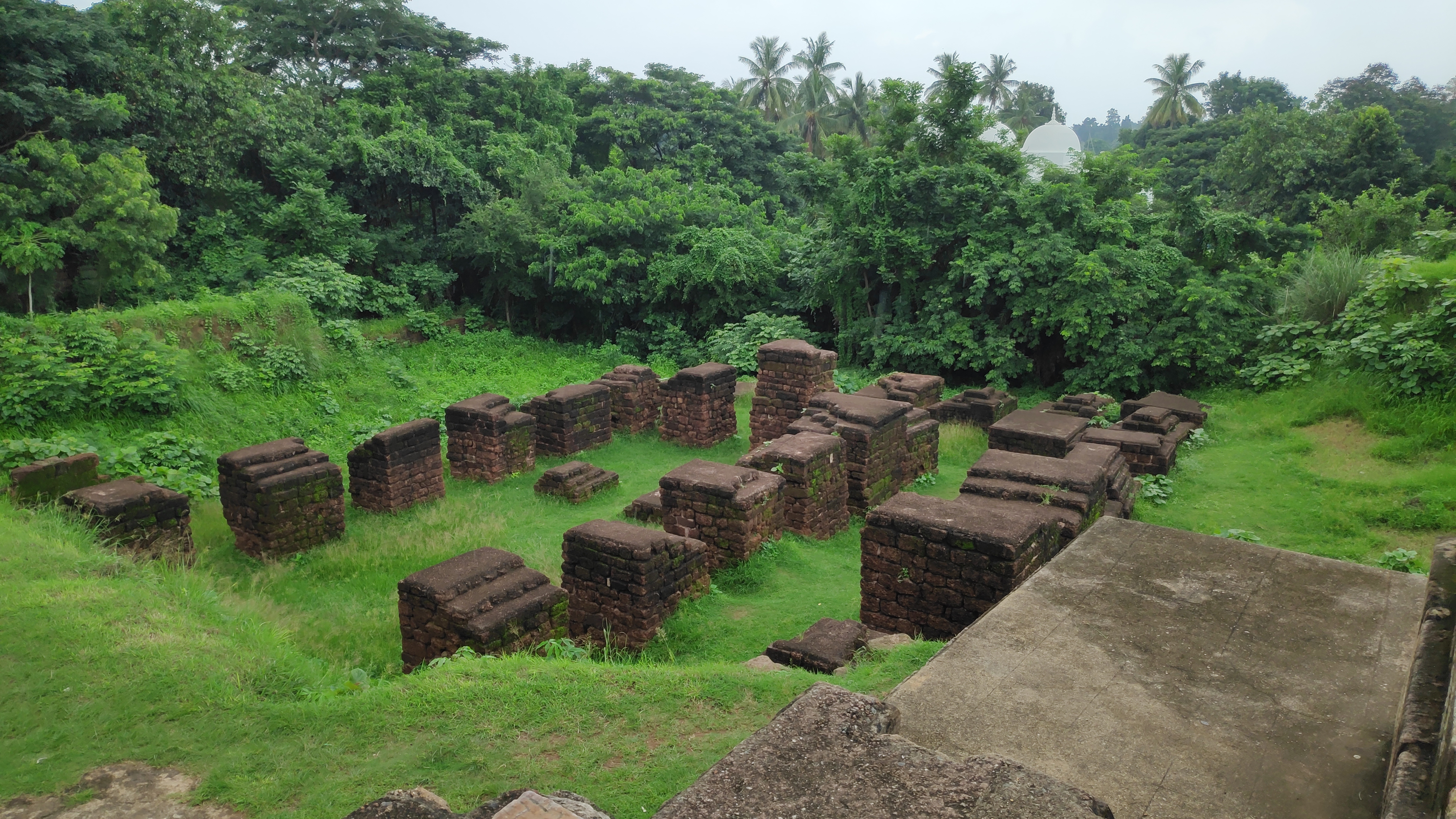
Bastions and ramparts of the fort

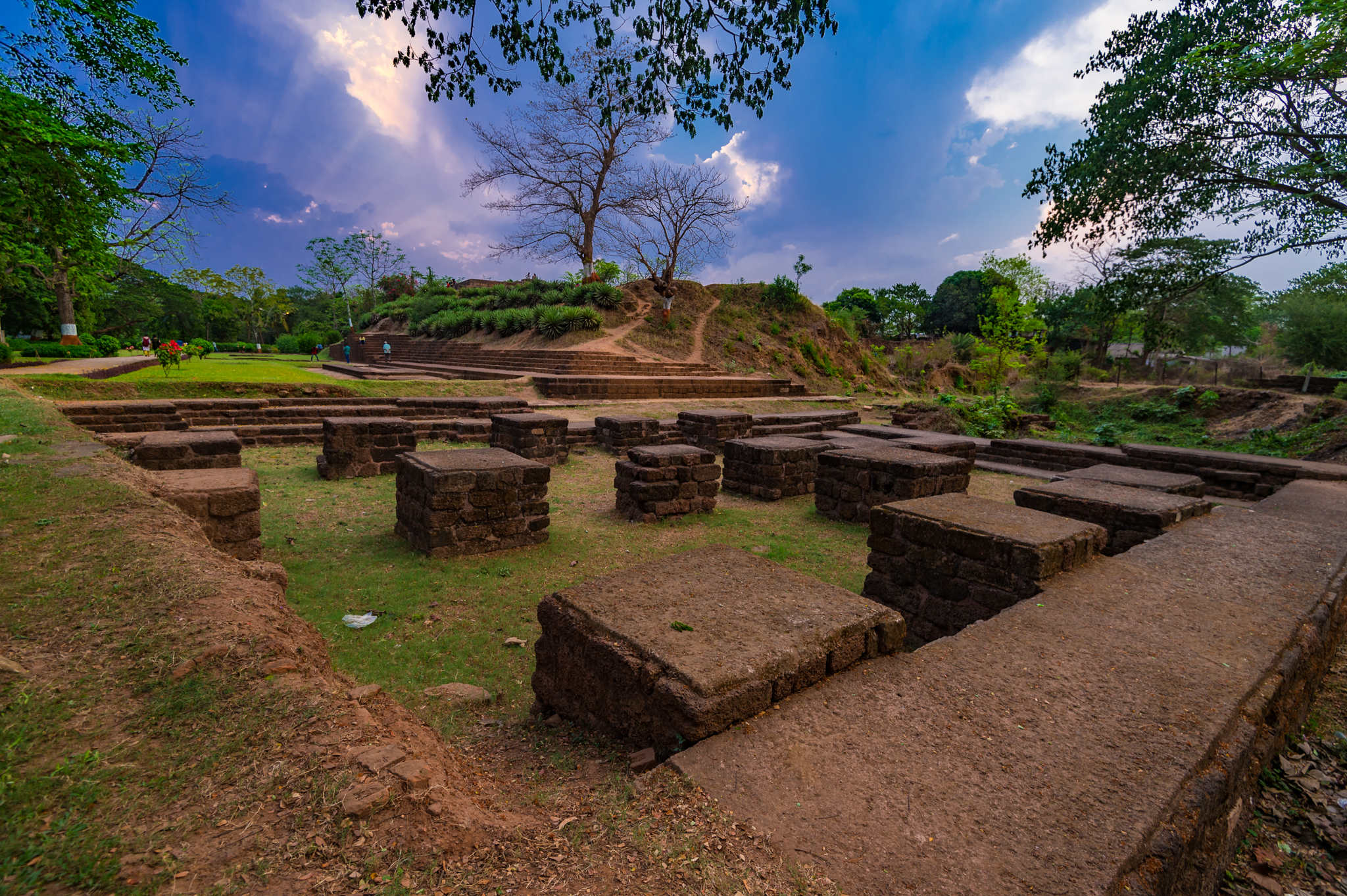
Barabati Fort - Ruins of the Nine Storied Complex and Elephant Stables

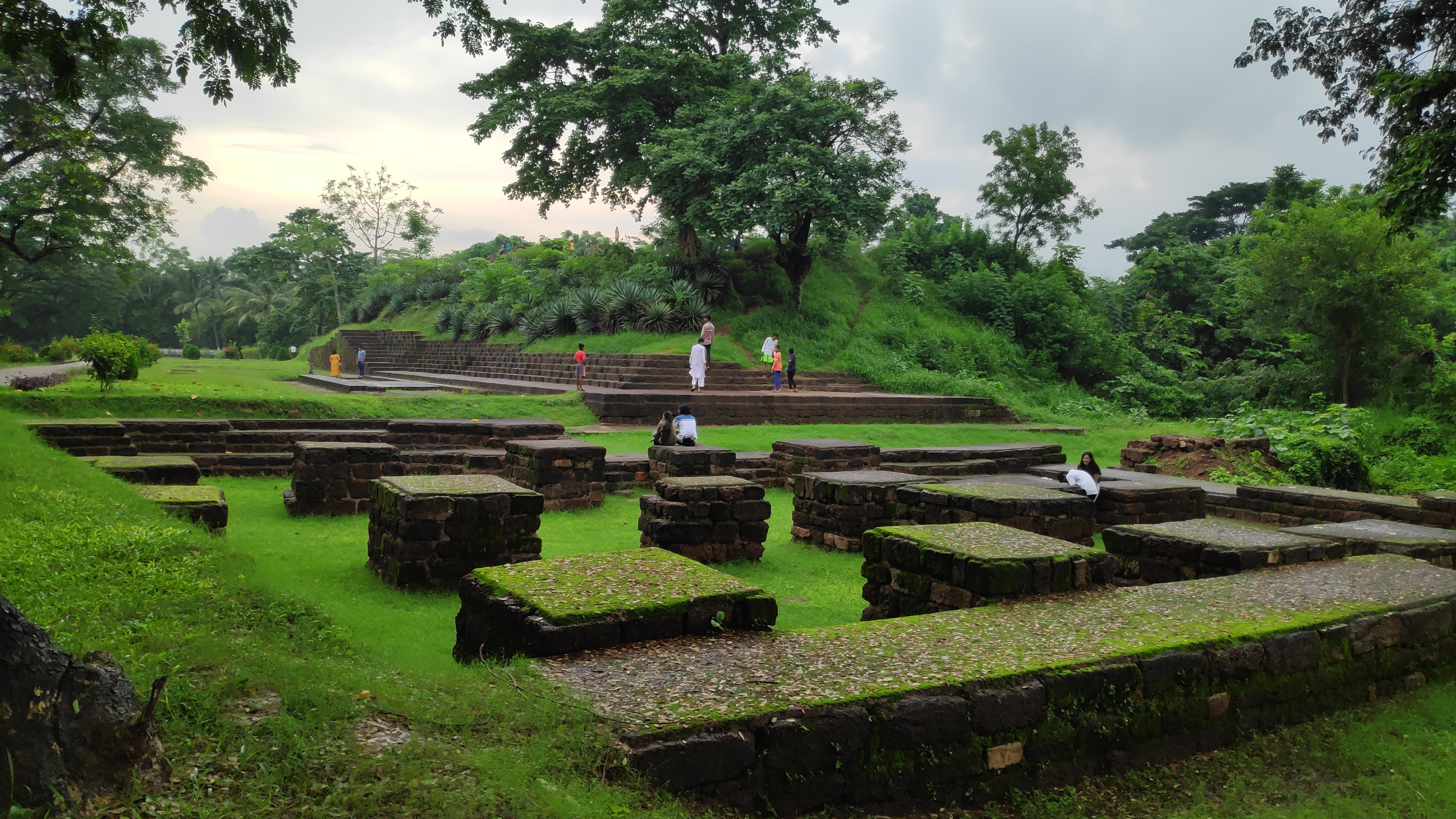
Ruins of the Nine Storied Complex and Elephant Stables

The fort is square in plan. It spreads over an area of 102 acres and surrounded on all sides with a stone paved moat of 10 Mtr. width in northern and western sides and 20 Mtr. width in the eastern and southern sides. The entire fort wall except the entrance is missing. Since 1915, in view of its national importance, the place has been declared as a protected site by Archaeological Survey of India.

At the centre of the fort, there was a high mound with a tank in the western side. It spreads over 15/16 acres of area. Now the site is under extensive encroachment. To the east of the mound, there is the Shahi Mosque while in the west of the tank lies the mazar (tomb) of Hazrat Ali Bukhari. In 1989, excavations were carried out by Archaeological Survey of India to ascertain the cultural horizon of the historic fort and the work is still in progress. Excavation by Archaeological survey of India on December 1, 1989, revealed evidence of a palace, a square structure built up of Khondalite stone. It was built over an area which was carefully prepared by filling up of 5 meter with sand and lime mixture. Trenches dug on the eastern side of the structure revealed 32 pillars built of laterite blocks roughly square but varying in size.

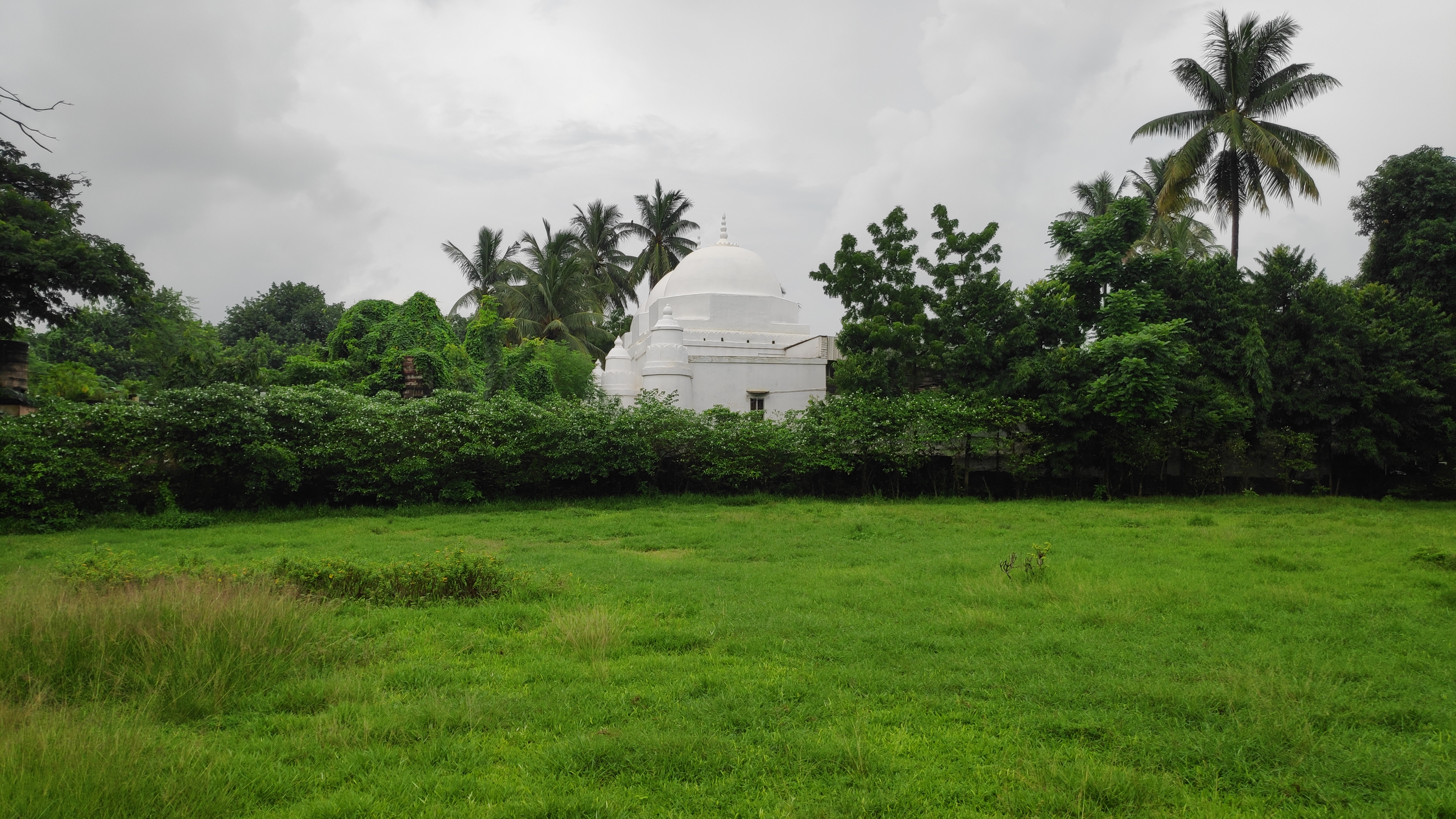
Mosque inside Barabati fort

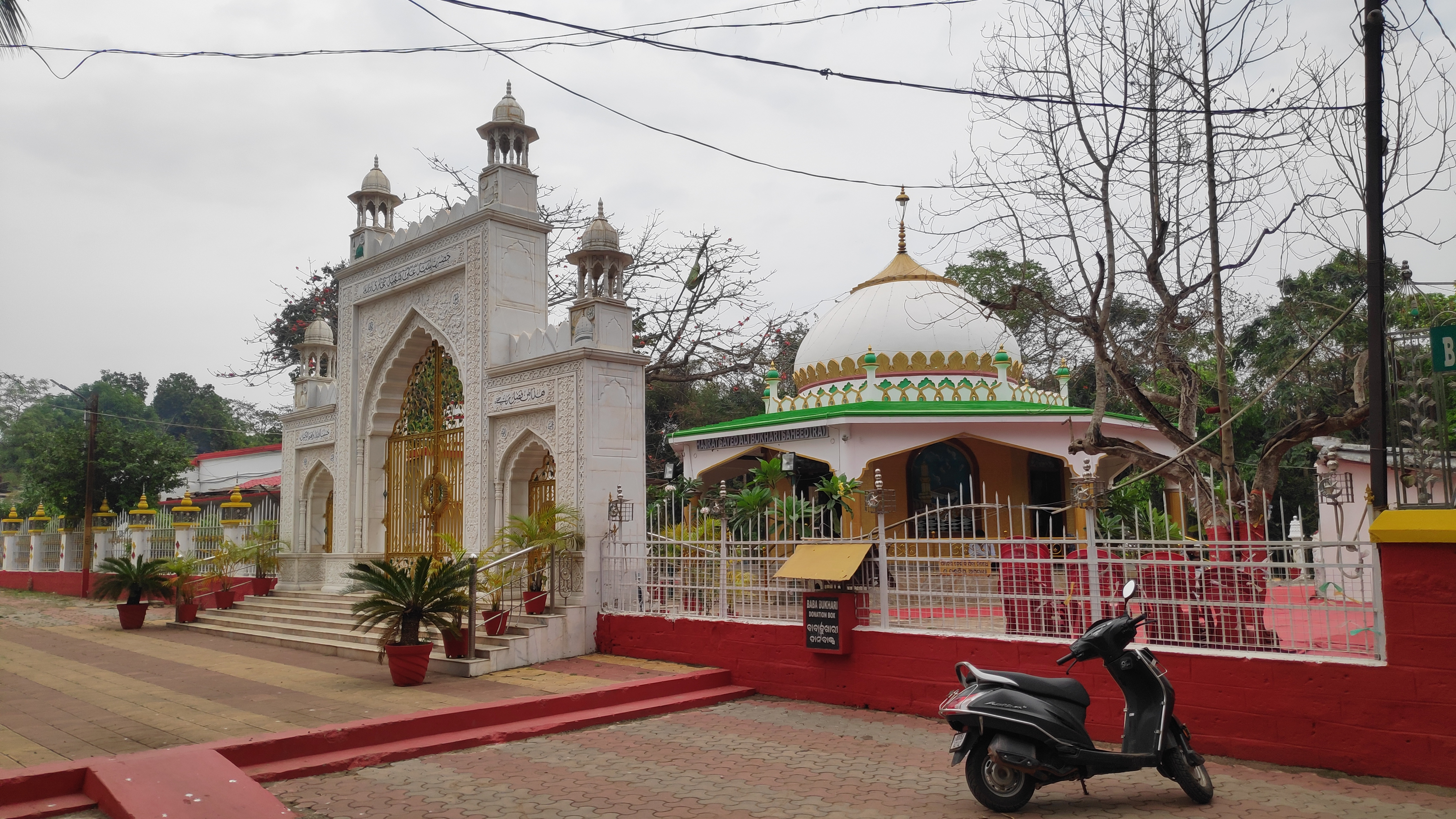
Mazar of Hazrat Sayed Ali Bukhari

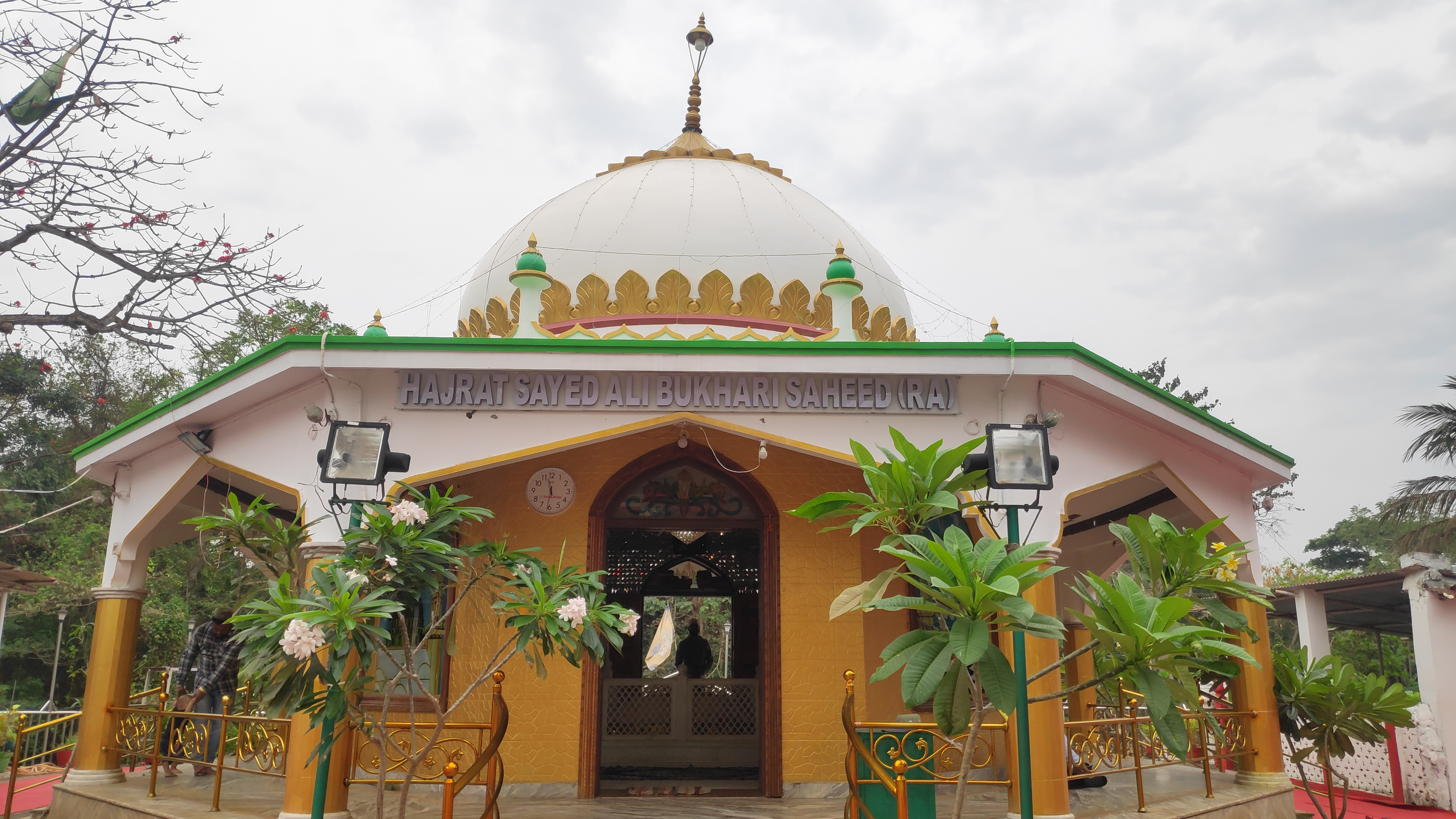
Mazar of Hazrat Sayed Ali Bukhari

In the northeastern corner of the mound, remains of a temple have been found. Excavation on the eastern and southern side of the mound revealed the existence of a citadel wall built of laterite blocks.

== Archaeological finds ==
During the 1989 excavation, the central mound area of the fort revealed the remains of a palace, a pavilion and foundation blocks made of rhodolite. Eighteen massive pillar bases, aligned in four rows at regular intervals, were exposed in the southern area.

Excavations of the site were also carried out in 2007 to establish the cultural chronology of the fortified fort. In these digs, some of the important antiquity finds included a seated goddess, lion-head, lamp fragment, balls and pot fragments of stone, sling balls, fragments of animal figurines of terracotta and axe and a stylus made of iron. The pottery finds comprised storage jars, spouted vessels, lamps, knobbed lids, miniature pots, dishes and bowls, the final portion of a hukkah and pieces of Chinese porcelain.

After a gap of 16 years, the excavation was restarted in 2023 to trace the link between Odisha and Southeast Asian countries.

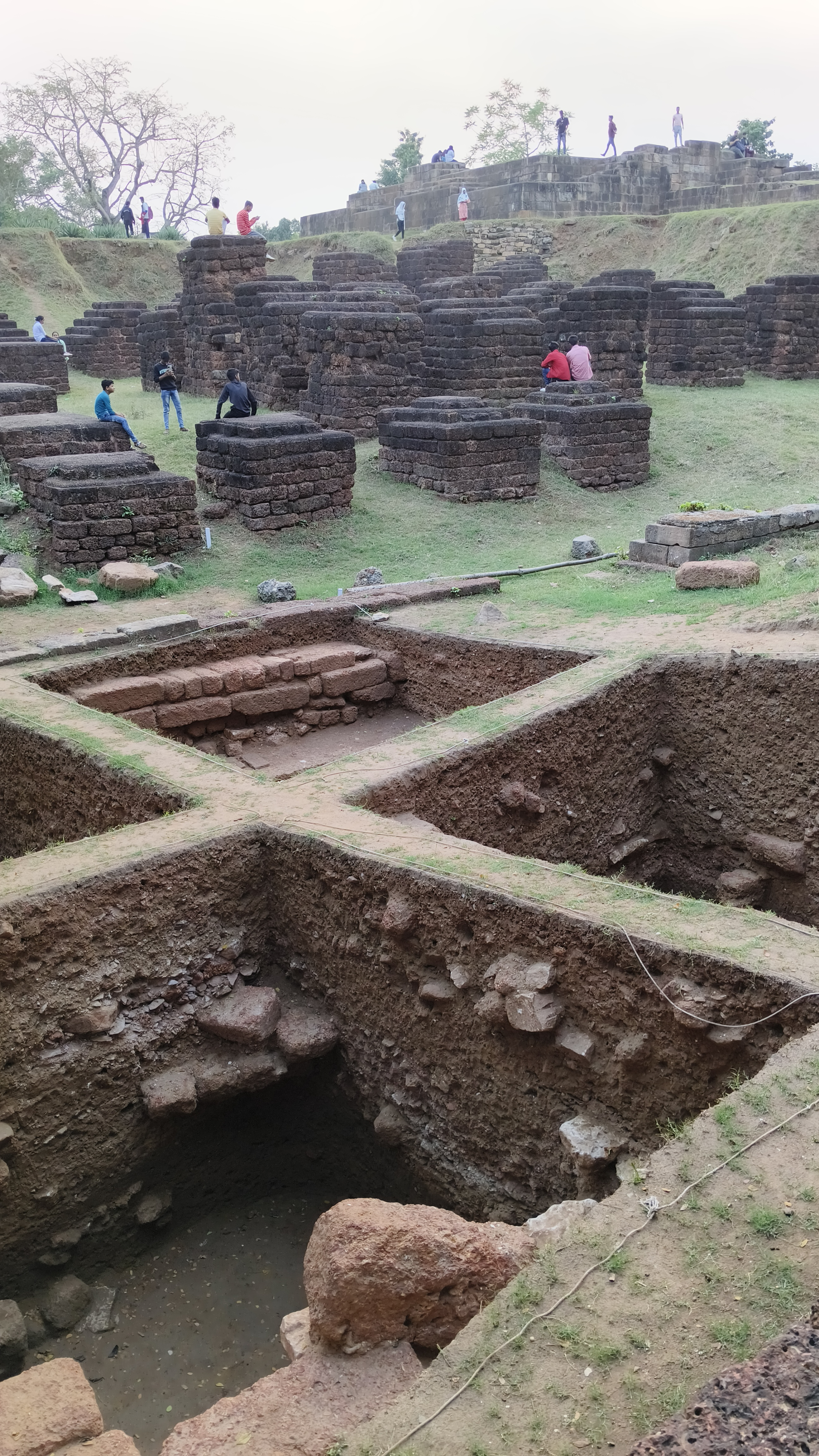
Ongoing excavation in Barabati fort

== See also ==
- List of Monuments of National Importance in Odisha
