= Muhammad Abdur Rahim =

Bangladeshi historian, educationist and researcher

- Born: 1 March 1921
- Died: 31 July 1981 (aged 60)

Muhammad Abdur Rahim also known as M.A. Rahim (1921 - 1981) was a Bangladeshi historian, educationist and researcher.

== Early life and education ==
Rahim was born at village Mohonpur of Matlab Upazilla of Chandpur on 1 March 1921. He started his primary education at a local school. 1936 he did matriculation (currently SSC) from Sengarchar High School and 1938 he passed IA (intermediate of Arts) from Dhaka Intermediate College. Afterwards he did BA in history with honors on 1941 and MA on 1942 from the University of Dhaka. He served as a lecturer of history at Malda College from 1943 to 1946 and from 1946 to 1949 he served at Jamalpur M.M College. On 11 January 1950 he was posted as temporary lecturer at University of Dhaka.

Rahim went to America on a Fulbright scholarship in 1952 for higher education and a year later he again joined the History Department of Dhaka University. In 1953, he was admitted to the School of Oriental and African Studies (SOAS) under the University of London for Ph.D. The History of the Afghans in India, 1545-1631 -was the title of his thesis. He left Dhaka University in 1954 to join the History Department of Karachi University as a lecturer and was promoted to reader the following year. He was promoted to the rank of professor in 1966. After the war of independence returned to Bangladesh and in 1973 MA. Rahim joined the history department of Dhaka University as a professor. From 1976 to 1979 he was engaged as the chairman of the department.

== Career ==
Rahim established himself as a teacher and successful researcher. He was associated with Bangladesh Historical Society and Asiatic Society of Bangladesh and devoted himself to research on medieval and modern history of South Asia. According to historian K. M. Mohsin, Rahim's Social and Cultural History of Bengal, published in Dukhand in 1963 and 1967, established him as a diligent researcher.

== Publications ==
- Rahim, M. A (1963). বাংলার সামাজিক ও সাংস্কৃতিক ইতিহাস. বাংলা একাডেমী. OCLC 583313097.
- Rahim, M. A (1974). History of the Musalmans of Bengal. Pakistan Pub. House.
- Rahim, M. A (1978). Muslim Society and politics in Bengal. Pakistan Pub. House.
- Rahim, M. A (1981). History of the Dhaka University.

== Death ==
Although he retired from fixed-term service on 30 June 1981, his tenure was extended. But he died on July 31 of that year.
