= Mir Habib =

Warlord under Nawab of Bengal and Maratha Empire

Mir Habib Isfahani (Persian: میر حبیب اصفهانی) was a warlord who used to be in the employment of the Mughal Subedars (officers) of Bengal, but after being discontent with promotions, went on to aid the Maratha invaders of Bengal and aided in the various Maratha campaigns carried out in Bengal, Bihar, Orissa and adjoining places.

== Early life ==
His family came from Isfahan, Iran and were Persianised Turks. He started his career under Murshid Kuli Khan. Mir Habib Isfahani was a Shia Muslim, soldier-turned-commander, in the employment of Alivardi Khan.

== Aiding Maratha ransacking ==
In 1742 when the Maratha invaders under Roghuji Bhosla and his prime minister Bhaskar Pandit invaded the Bengal Subah, Mir Habib Isfahani was lured to join their forces in search of loots as he was not content with his salary as a commander of Nawab Alivardi Khan's army. This invasion was later suppressed by Nawab Alivardi Khan.

In 1748, Mir Habib joined forces with Maratha general Raghoji I Bhonsle to invade Bengal, also with the support of Mustafa Khan, an Afghan defect from the Nawab's army. With the aid of the renegade commanders, the Marathas were able to ransack Hooghly and Mir Habib entered Murshidabad, the capital of Bengal. They were driven out again by Alivardi Khan.

In 1751, the Marathas signed a peace treaty with Nawab Alivardi Khan, according to which Mir Habib was made provincial governor of Orissa under nominal control of the Nawab. Habib was later killed by the Marathas leading to Orissa coming under Maratha rule.
