= Sirajul Islam =

Bangladeshi historian, writer and academic (born 1939)

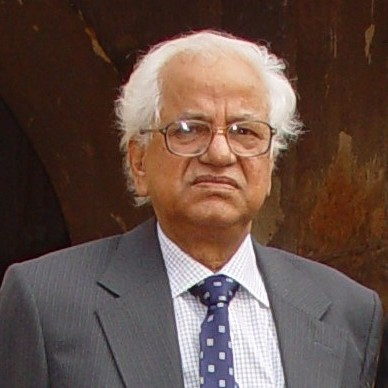
- Sirajul Islam

President

Asiatic Society of Bangladesh
- In office 1994–1995
- Preceded by: AKM Nurul Islam
- Succeeded by: Wakil Ahmed
- In office 2008–2011
- Preceded by: Emajuddin Ahamed
- Succeeded by: Nazrul Islam

Personal details
- Occupation: Historian; Editor; Columnist; Academician
- Known for: Chief editor of Banglapedia

Sirajul Islam is Bangladeshi historian, writer, columnist, professor and academician. He is the chairman of the Board of Editors of Banglapedia, the national encyclopedia of Bangladesh and the editor of the Journal of the Asiatic Society of Bangladesh. He is also famous for his works on agriculture, British era land tenure and social history of Bengal.

== Career ==
Sirajul Islam served as a professor of history department at the University of Dhaka. He gave up his day job five years before the formal date of retirement, to make time for Banglapedia in 2000.

A corresponding fellow of the Royal Historical Society, Sirajul Islam was a Senior Commonwealth Staff Fellow at the University of London (1978–79), a Senior Fulbright Scholar at Urbana-Champaign (1990–91), and a British Academy Visiting Professor (2004).

== Work ==
In 2002, 10 volumes of Banglapedia, published by Asiatic Society came out in his editorship. In 1991, 3 volumes of the History of Bangladesh (political, economic and socio-cultural), published by Asiatic Society, came out in his editorship. For the society, he is working on the Children’s Banglapedia and the Cultural Survey of Bangladesh. He also is in charge of the National Online Biography project of the society and the Banglapedia Trust.

During his 34-year-long stint at the university, he wrote major seminal works like Permanent Settlement in Bengal (1978), The Bengal Land Tenure (1990) and the Rural History of Bangladesh (1990). He also edited the 4 volume Bangladesh District Record Survey.
