= Siege of Ratanpur =

Siege of Ratanpur (1740)
- Part of Maratha conquest of Chhattisgarh
Date	1740
Location	Ratanpur
Result	Maratha victory: Ratanpur fort captured by Marathas; Haihaiyavanshi Kingdom and other petty chieftains come under suzerainty of Nagpur
Territorial changes	Haihaiyavanshi Kingdom and other petty chieftains such as Kanker State, Koriya State, come under suzerainty of Nagpur

Belligerents
Maratha Empire: Kingdom of Nagpur	Haihaiyavanshi Kingdom

Commanders and leaders
Bhaskar Pandit	Raghunath Singh

Strength
40,000 men chiefly Cavalry	unknown

The siege of Ratanpur in 1740 was a siege led by the Marathas of Nagpur on the fort of Ratanpur, capital of the Haihaiyavanshi Kingdom. There was almost no resistance by the Haihaiyavanshis, which resulted in a victory for the Marathas.

== Background ==
The Bhonsle Maratha armies passed through Chhattisgarh on their way to invade the Odia kingdoms in eastern India. Bhaskar Pant invaded the Haihaiyavanshi Kingdom at the close of 1740. According to Sir Charles Grant, Raghunath Singh, the Haihaiyavanshi king, was bowed down with a heavy sorrow, which was the loss of his only son. He refused to take any interest in the government for nearly a year. At best, he was a feeble man, but now worn out with years and afflicted in mind. According to Sir Charles Grant, the Maratha army is said to have consisted of 40,000 men, chiefly horsemen. The branch Haihaiyavanshi ruler of Raipur, Amar Singh, did not oppose him.

== Siege ==
Raghunath Singh made no effort to defend his kingdom and waited till Bhaskar Pant reached his capital. Even then, there was no resistance from the defenders. But Raghunath Singh ordered the gates of the fort to be shut. Bhaskar Pant bought his guns to play on the fort, and soon a part of the palace was in ruins. At this point, one of the Ranis (queen) named Laxmi hoisted a white flag on the ramparts of the fort. The gates for opened, and the invading Marathas entered the fort and looted the city.

== Aftermath ==
A fine of one lakh rupees was imposed on the town and all the wealth that remained in the treasury was seized. Then the country was pillaged in all directions by the Maratha army. However, Raghunath Singh was not harmed in any manner and allowed to rule at Ratanpur under the suzerainty of the Marathas. Having crushed the Haihaiyavanshi king, the nominal overlord of the many petty chieftains and surrounding states, the Marathas demanded that the petty rulers submit to them, and the rulers did.

Raigarh fell to the Bhonsles in 1741, and by 1742 Maratha control over the kingdom was firmly established.

== See also ==
- Bhaskar Pant
- Haihaiyavanshi Kingdom
- Kingdom of Nagpur
