= Babu Rewaram =

Indian historian

Babu Revaram
- Born: 1812; Ratanpur, Chhattisgarh subah, Nagpur Kingdom
- Died: 1873 (aged 60–61)
- Other name: Babuji
- Known for: Writing the first organized history of Chhattisgarh
- Notable work: Ratanpur Itihas (Ratanpur History); Tawarikh Shri Haihaiyavamsa Rajaon ki (History of the Haihaiya dynasty kings); Ratnapariksha; Brahmastrota; Vikramvilas (1839); Gangalahiri; Saar Ramayana Deepika; Narmadakantak; Geeta Madhav; Dohavali

Babu Revaram (1812-1873) was a poet and historian of Chhattisgarh, who played a vital role in reconstructing the history of that region. He is known as the "first historian of Chhattisgarh" because he wrote several important historical works such as the Tawarikh Shri Haihaiyavamsa Rajaon ki (History of the Haihaiya dynasty kings) and Ratanpur Itihas (Ratanpur History). He also wrote poetic works like Saar Ramayana Deepika and Geeta Madhav. The term "Chhattisgarh" was first used in a historical text by Babu Revaram in his Vikram Vilas, published in 1839.

== Life ==
Babu Revaram was born in Ratanpur town in the region of Chhattisgarh in the year 1812. The Nagpur Kingdom of the Maratha Empire used to rule Chhattisgarh as a subah (province) at that time. He was descended from the diwans (highest officer after the king) of the Haihaiyavanshi kings, who used to rule Chhattisgarh until 1758.

Babu Revaram published a total of 13 books, out of which 2 are epics. He wrote several important historical works such as the Ratanpur Itihas (Ratanpur history) and Tawarikh Shri Haihaiyavamsa Rajaon ki (History of the Haihaiya dynasty kings), which are the first systematic and organized history of the Haihaiyavanshi kings. According to Pandit Kesharilal Verma, Vice-chancellor of Pt. Ravishankar Shukla University, Babu Revaram was a known poet, historian, dramatist, musician, astronomer, gem connoisseur, astrologer and polyglot.

The noted works of Babu Reva Ram are: Ratanpur Itihas, Tawarikh Shri Haihaiyavamsa Rajaon ki, Ratnapariksha, Brahmastrota, Vikramvilas, Gangalahiri, Saar Ramayana Deepika, Narmadakantak, Geeta Madhav and Dohavali. He also published Panchang (a type of calendar), on which the Pandits of Kashi honored him by giving him the title of 'Mahapandit' (great scholar). Babu Revaram was a polygot and knew several languages- Sanskrit, Hindi, Braj Bhasha, Marathi, Urdu and Persian. He was an avid pioneer of the popular Gammat folk dance of Chhattisgarh. The hymns of the goddess 'Mata Seva' that are sung during the Navratri festival were also composed by Babu Revaram.

He died in 1873 around the age of 61.
