= Mohansingh (ruler) =

Ruler of Haihaiyavanshi Kingdom
- Coronation: c. 1755
- Predecessor: Raghunath Singh
- Successor: Bimbaji Bhonsle
- Died: 1758; Raipur
- House: Haihaiyavanshi
- Religion: Hinduism

Mohan Singh (c. 1755–1758) was the last ruler of the Haihaiyavanshi Kingdom, the dynasty which ruled Chhattisgarh for over 700 years. He ruled Chhattisgarh under the suzerainty of the Bhonsles of Nagpur Kingdom.

== Early life ==
The king of the Haihaiyavanshi Kingdom, Raja Raj Singh (c. 1689–1712) had no son and became interested in a young man named Mohan Singh, who belonged to the Raipur branch of the Haihayas. According to J.W. Chisholm, Mohansingh was represented as "a young man of physical strength and considerable personal attraction". The young Mohansingh remained with the raja Raj Singh frequently for months and became his favourite.

Raj Singh eventually made Mohan Singh his successor, however, the death of Raj Singh was somewhat sudden and Mohan Singh was on a shooting expedition at that time. Thus Mohan Singh could not come back early and Rajsingh thus crowned his grand-uncle Sardar Singh as the king. However, Mohansingh was dissatisfied with this development and while leaving the kingdom he declared that "he would yet return and assume government". He unsuccessfully tried to raise an army to create a revolution against the Haihayas, since their rule was popular.

According to a theory proposed by Dr. P.L. Mishra, he wandered aimlessly for at least twenty years during the reign of Sardarsingh. After the Bhonsle family came to power in Berar and the Nagpur Kingdom, he went to them and earned the favour of Raghuji Bhonsle, the Bhonsle ruler. In 1740, with the successful invasion of Chhattisgarh by the Maratha general Bhaskar Pant, the Haihaiyavanshi King Raghunath Singh became a Maratha vassal. When the old Raghunath Singh died in 1745, Raghuji Bhonsle, who was returning from the Bengal campaign, installed Mohansingh as the Haihaya king under his suzerainty.

== Reign ==
The zamindars of the kingdom were irked at the new king, Mohansingh since he was a Maratha vassal. Unlike his Haihaya ancestors, who solely exercised overlordship over petty chieftains, Mohansingh started successfully conquering and directly ruling over the zamindaris. In order to please his Maratha overlords, he deposed the Haihaya ruler of Raipur, who was his relative and gave him a pension. After the death of the ruler in 1753, he stopped the pension to his cousins.

He was faithful and obedient to the king at Nagpur and paid regular tribute to the Bhonsle treasury. After Raghuji Bhonsle's death, his sons were assigned different roles by the peshwa to avoid a succession struggle. Janoji became the king of Nagpur and given the title of Sena Sahib Suba, Sabaji was to govern Western Berar with his headquarters at Darwha, Mudhoji was given the title of Senadhurandhar with Chanda an Chhattisgarh as his jurisdiction and Bhonsle was to govern Chhattisgarh with his headquarters at Ratanpur.

Therefore Bimbaji proceeded for Chhattisgarh to assume his post, which would mean Mohansingh's dismissal. Therefore Mohansingh started collecting his resources and forces near Raipur half-heartedly but he died shortly after and thus, Bimbaji assumed rule of the region with ease.
