= Kingdom of Haihaiyavansi =

Kingdom ruled by the Kalachuris of Raipur

Kalachuris of Raipur
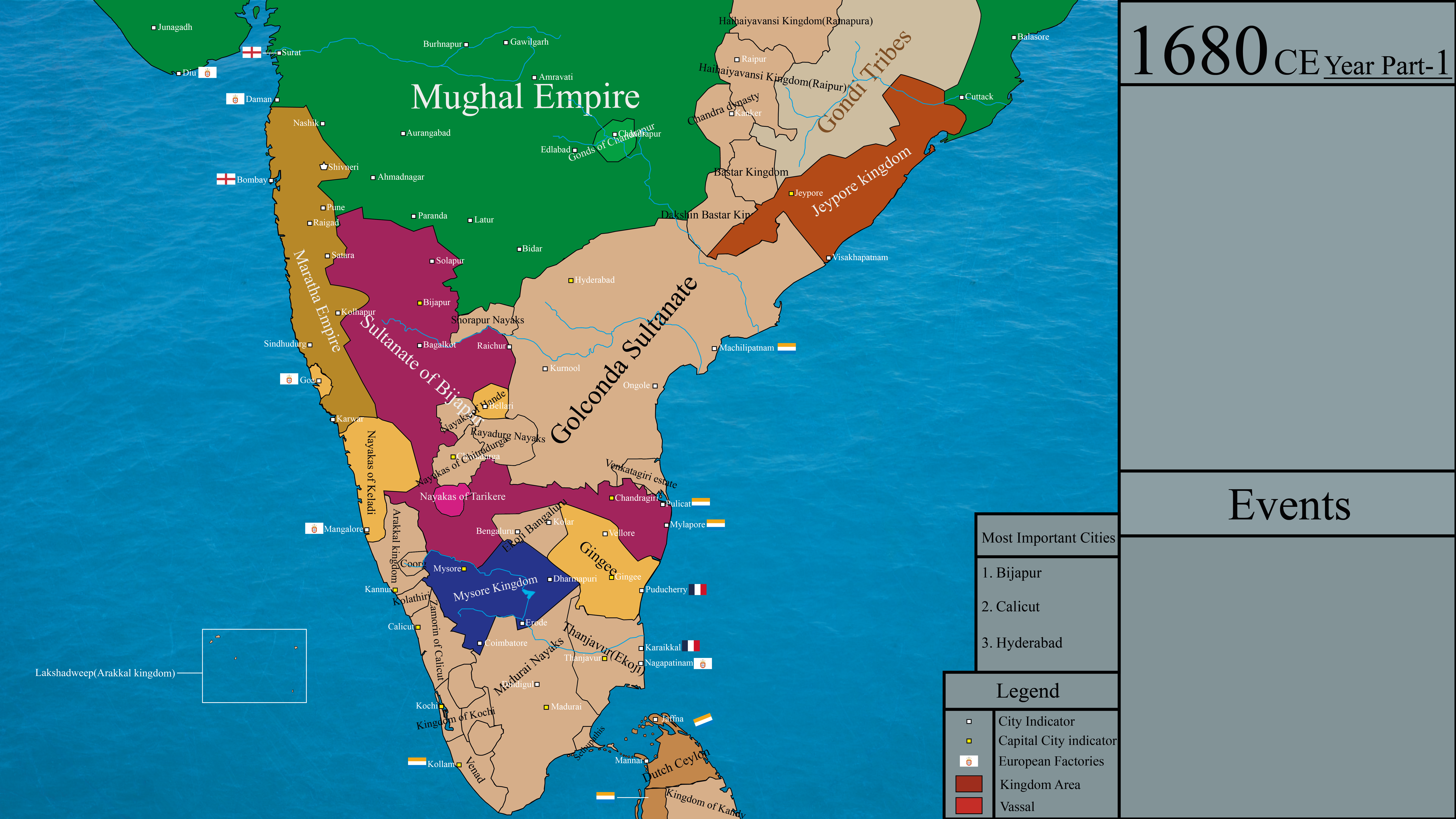
- Haihaiyavanshi Garh in 17th century, split into two branches at Ratanpur and Raipur
- Capital: Raipur (Rayapura)
- Religion: Hinduism
- Government: Monarchy
Preceded by	Succeeded by
Kalachuris of Ratnapura	Bhonsle dynasty
- Today part of: India

The Kingdom of Haihaiyavansi, ruled by the Kalachuris of Raipur was a kingdom which consisted of the central part of the present-day state of Chhattisgarh located in India.

In 1740, the Maratha general of Nagpur, Bhaskar Pant conquered the kingdom for Raghoji I Bhonsle. The Raipur branch of the kingdom survived until 1753, also being annexed by the Marathas of Nagpur.

The last ruler was Mohan Singh, who ruled under the suzerainty of Raghoji Bhonsle of Nagpur and died in 1758.

== History ==
The Kalachuris of Raipur branched off from the Kalachuris of Ratnapura in the 14th century; the Ratnapura branch was, in turn, an offshoot of the Kalachuris of Tripuri.

The Raipur State originated as the eastern province of the tenth-century Tripuri Kalachuri or Chedi kingdom, which was centered in the upper Narmada River valley. The kingdom was located east of the main routes between northern and southern India, and thus was unaffected by the Muslim invasions of the 13th-16th centuries. The Haihaiyavanshi state enjoyed under Garha Kingdom 700 years of peaceful existence due to its borders being protected by precipitous mountain ranges on almost all sides.

In the second half of the 12th century, on the accession of Suradeva, the 20th king, the Ratnapura state was divided between him at Ratanpur (Ratnapura) and his younger brother Brahmadeva, who founded a younger branch at Raipur to the south. At the end of the 16th century, the Haihaiyavanshi kings recognized the suzerainty of the Mughal Empire.

It has been conjectured that the name Mahakosal, the greater Kosala, was made common for Dakshin Kosal or Chhattisgarh by the Chedi - Haihaiyavanshi rulers of this region to make their state sound more dignified and their sovereignty seem more pronounced. The town of Amarkantak is said to have been built by the Haihayavanshis.

=== Mattha lineage ===
In the ancient land of India near the Narmada river, the Mattha clan thrived, tracing their lineage to the legendary Sahasra Bahu, a warrior-king known for his bravery and strength. According to historical accounts, the Mattha clan belonged to the Heyhayavansh dynasty, renowned for their valor and leadership.

=== Maratha suzerainty ===
After the death of Raghunath Singh in 1745, Mohan Singh a member of the Haihaiyavanshi Raipur branch, was placed on the throne by Raghoji I Bhonsle. He was loyal to the Bhonsle Nagpur Kingdom and paid regular tribute to the Bhonsle treasury. However, in 1758, Bimbaji Bhonsle was sent against him to assume direct control of Chhattisgarh. Mohan Singh started amassing his forces near Raipur, but died shortly after and thus, Bimbaji Bhonsle assumed rule of the region with ease.

== Administration ==
According to a tradition, popularized by Cecil Upton Wills (1919), the principalities Raipur and Ratanpur were "sub-kingdoms", and each had 18 forts; the name "Chhattisgarh" derives from these 36 (Chhattis) forts (garh). However, experts disagree with this theory for several reasons: the name Chhattisgarh does not appear in early records, no historical records identify the 36 forts, and early records list 48 forts in the area.

According to Willis, the term garh referred to a district, which was under the charge of the feudal lords (thakurs or diwans), who owed allegiance to the king. The garh was also known as chaurasi (eighty-four) because it was meant to be made up of 84 villages. The garhs were in turn made up of smaller units called taluks. The taluk, which was supposed to contain 12 villages and was also known as bahron (twelve) was held by a dao or barhainya whose authority in the unit closely resembled that of the diwan within the taluk. The village was held by a gaonthia or headman.

Several parts of Chhattisgarh country were held by feudatory chiefs who ruled under the suzerainty of the Haihaiyavanshis. Some were Kanker State, Sarangarh State and Sakti State.

== See also ==
- Heheya Kingdom
