= Bambleshwari Temple =

Hindu temple in chhattisgarh

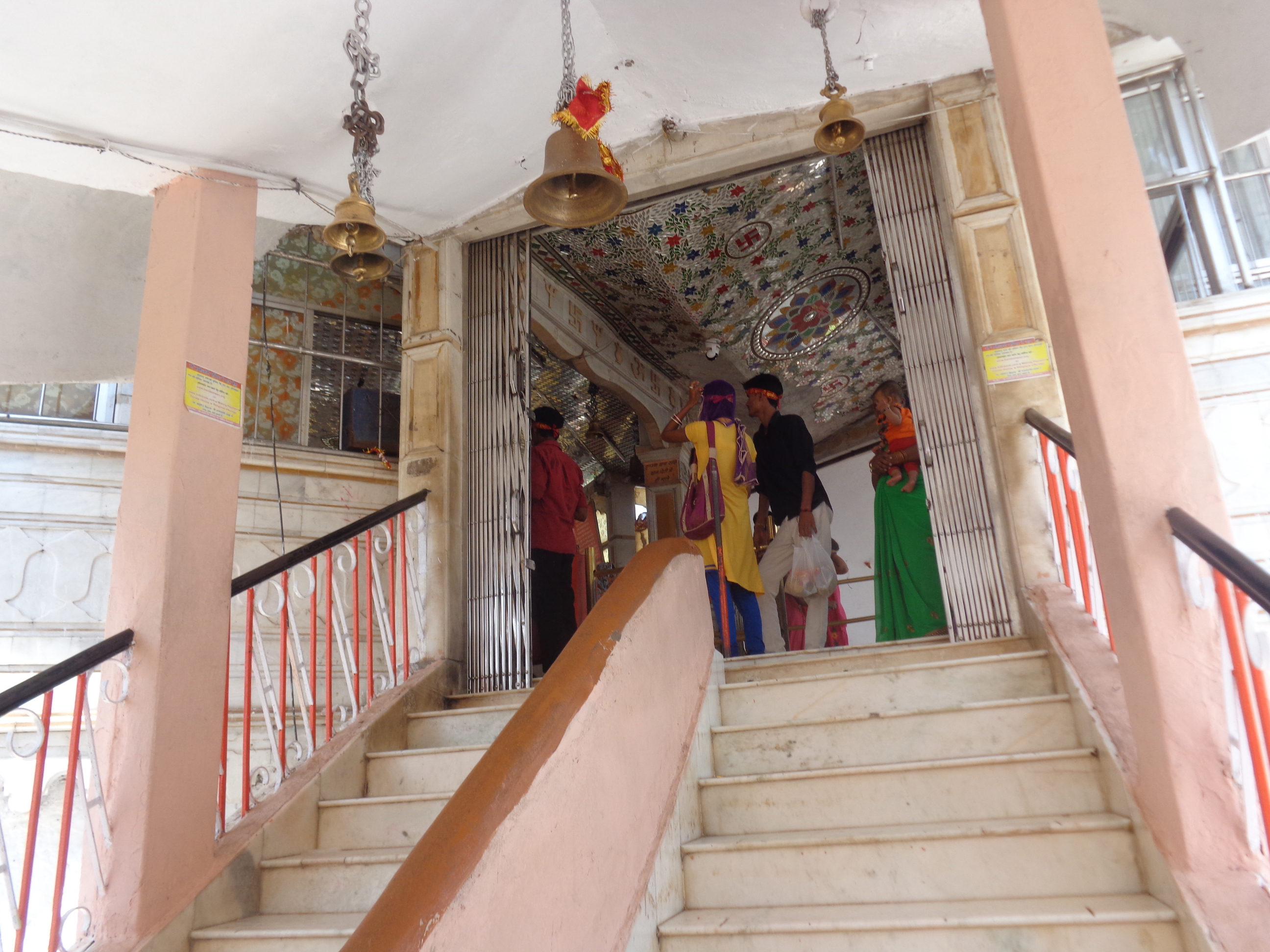

- Location in Chhattisgarh

Religion
- Affiliation: Hinduism
- District: Rajnandgaon
- Deity: Bambleshwari (Durga)
- Festivals: Navaratri, Ram Navami, Jyoti Kalash

Location
- Location: Dongargarh
- State: Chhattisgarh
- Country: India
- Coordinates: 21°10′46″N 80°45′9″E

Architecture
- Type: Nagara Style

Website
- www.bamleshwari.org

Bambleshwari Temple is a Hindu temple, located at Dongargarh in Rajnandgaon district, Chhattisgarh, India. It is on a hilltop of 1600 feet. This temple is referred to as Badi Bambleshwari. Another temple at ground level, the Chhotti Bambleshwari is situated about 1/2 km from the main temple complex. These temples are revered by lakhs of people of Chhattisgarh who flock around the shrine during the Navratris of Kavar (during Dusshera) and Chaitra (during Ram Navami). There is a tradition of lighting Jyoti Kalash during Navaratris here.

== Location ==
Dongargarh is 107 kilometers from Raipur, via Bhilai, Durg and Rajnandgaon. Dongargarh does not exactly fall on the massive Mumbai highway, a diversion some 25 km before, from the Calcutta-Calcutta-Mumbai National Highway (NH #6) leads the vehicle through lush green vegetation and mild forests on a narrow winding single road.

Dongargarh is 40 km from district headquarters Rajnandgaon and is well connected with buses from Rajnandgaon. Dongargarh as well as trains. It is on the Mumbai - Howrah main line at a distance of 200 km from Nagpur and 100 km from Raipur. The nearest airport is at Raipur Airport.

The rope-way in the hill on which the temple is located, is another attraction to the tourists in the city. It is very popular with the tourists as it is the only rope-way that has been set up in Chhattisgarh state.

== Legend ==
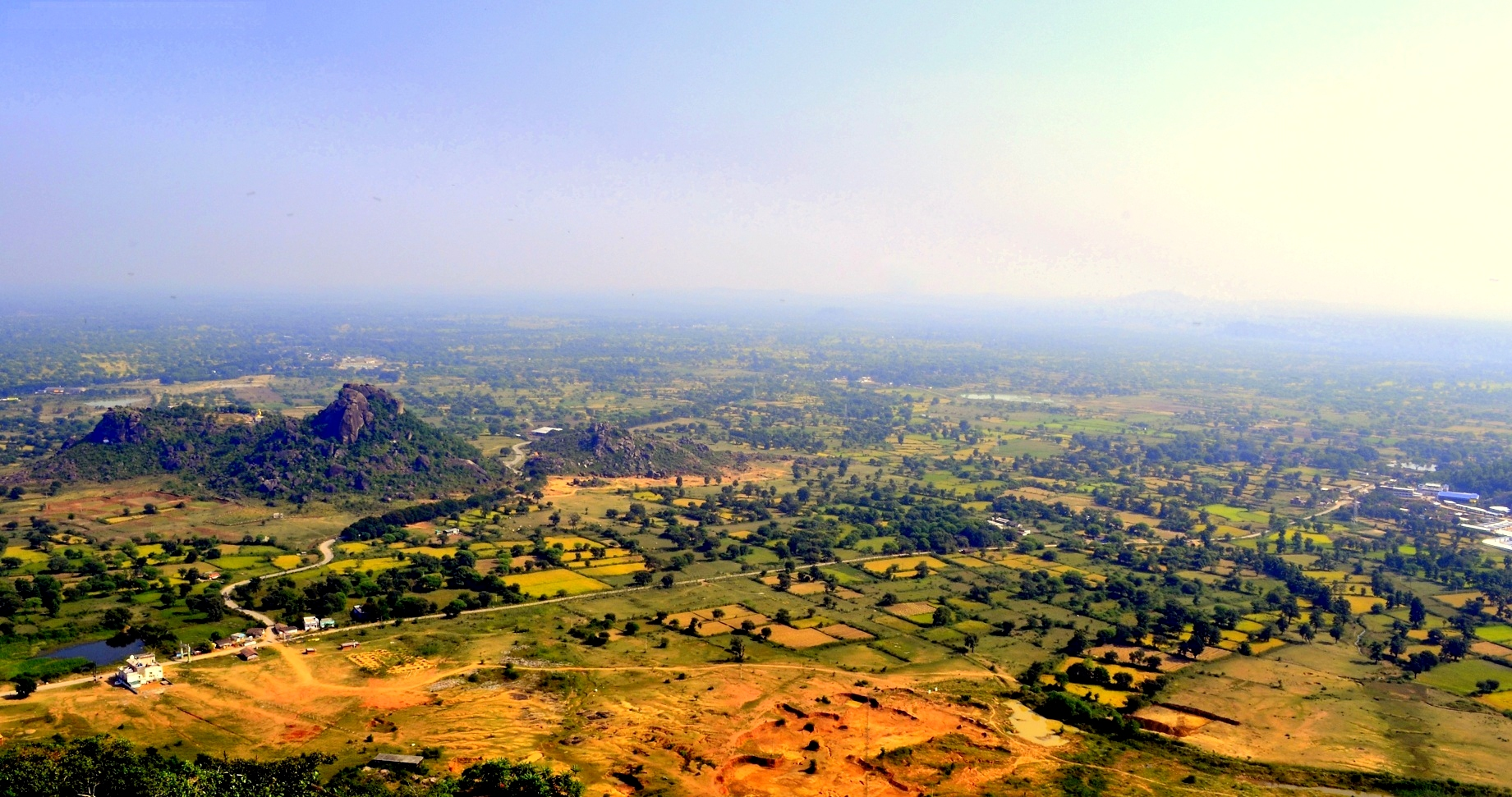
Aerial view of Dongargarh from Maa Bamleshwari Temple on a hilltop

Dongar means mountains in Chhattisgarhi language and Marathi Language while Garh means fort. The legend goes that around 2200 years ago, Raja Veersen, a local king, was childless and upon the suggestions of his royal priests performed puja to the gods. Within a year, the queen gave birth to a son whom they named Madansen. Raja Veersen considered this a blessing of Lord Shiva and Parvati and constructed a temple here..In the temple of Dongargarh, king Vikramaditya went to commit suicide but Devi Bamleshwari appeared and stopped him from doing it. For reaching the top, there are total 1000 steps that lead to the temple.

== Ropeway accident ==
On 29 February 2016, a woman was killed and three others were injured in a ropeway mishap. On 18 February 2021, a labourer died in a similar accident. both these accidents happened in old ropeway.

== See also ==
- List of Hindu temples in India

== Gallery ==
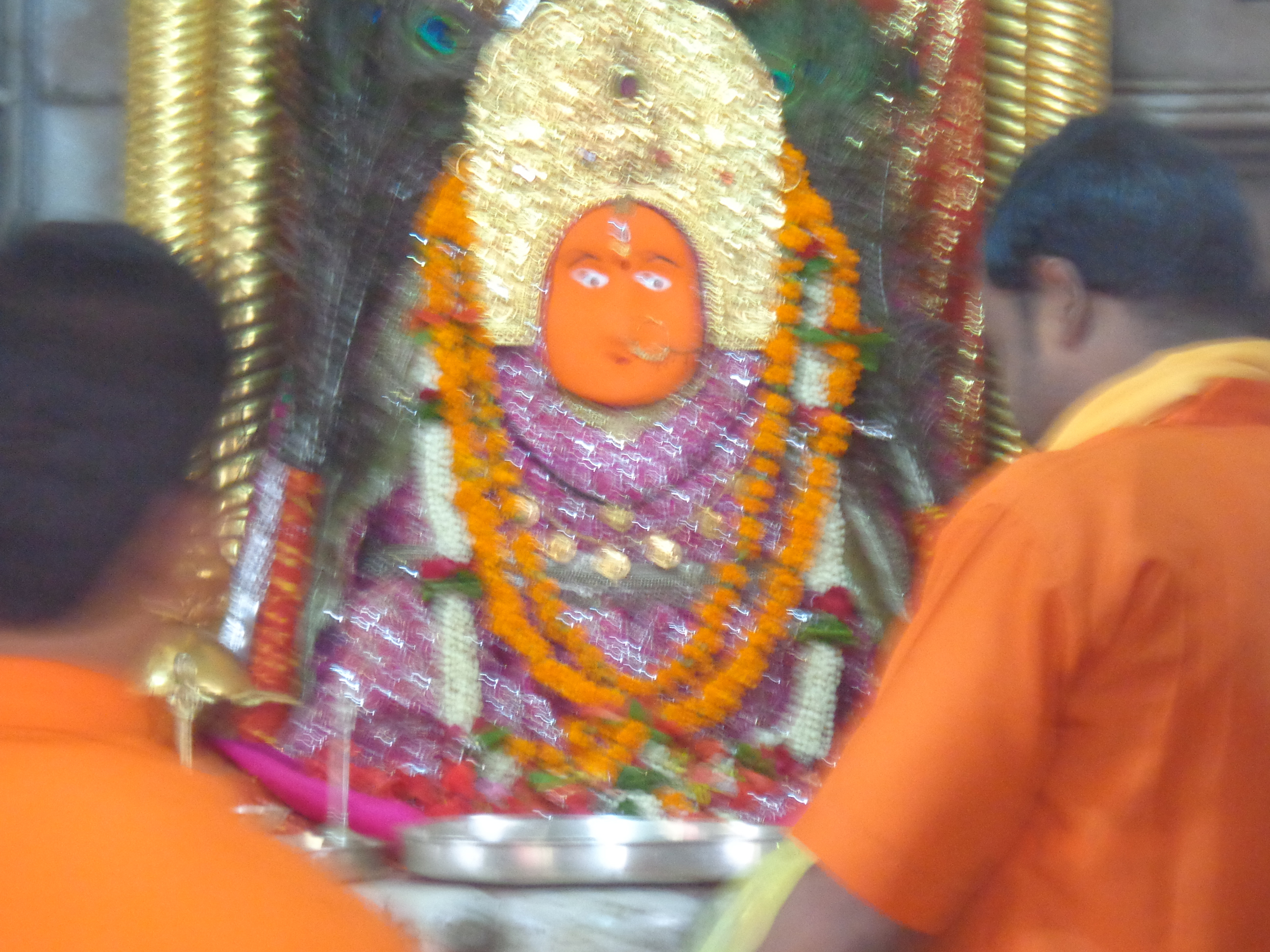
Idol of Bambleshwari

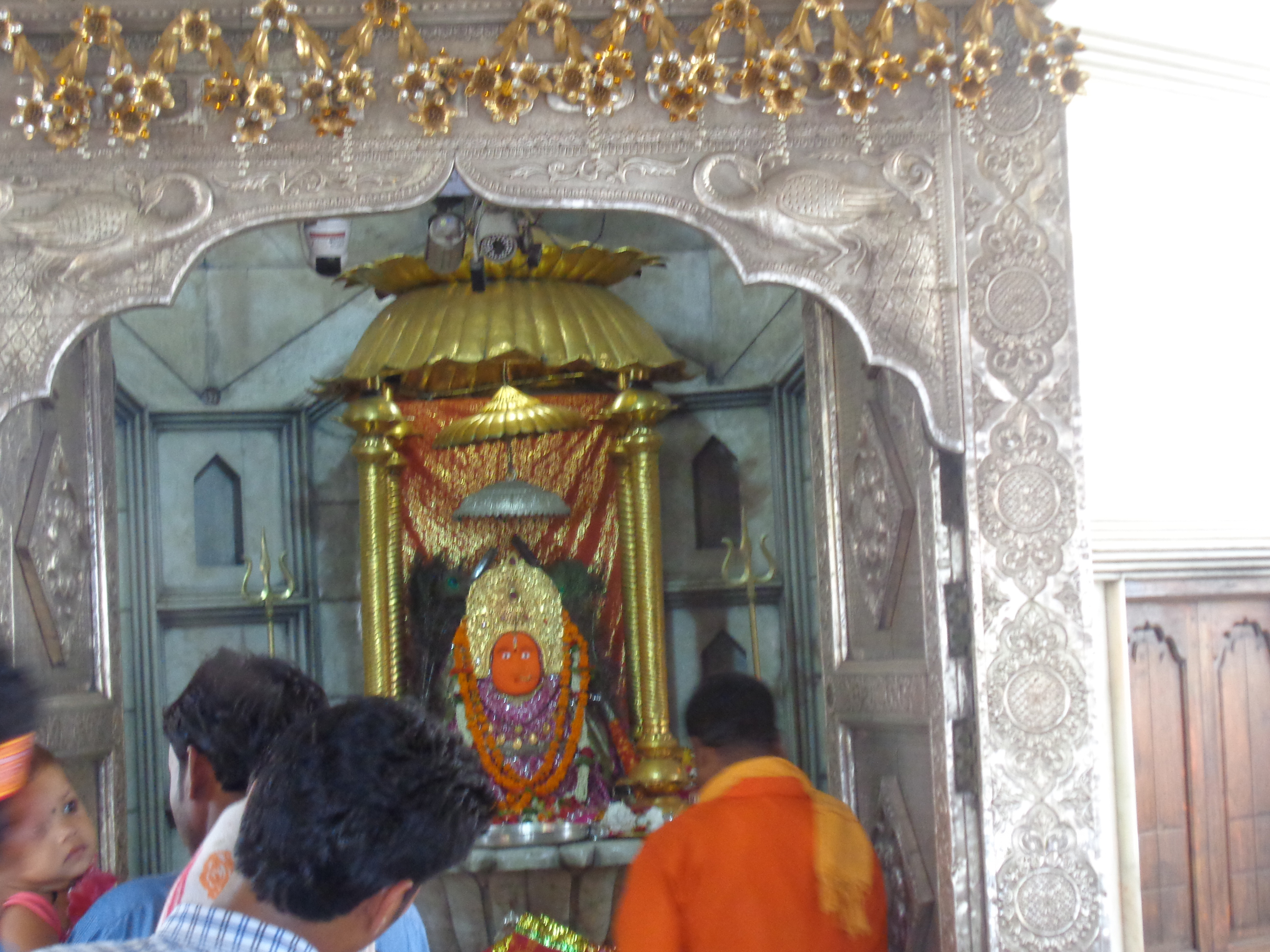
The Garbhagruha

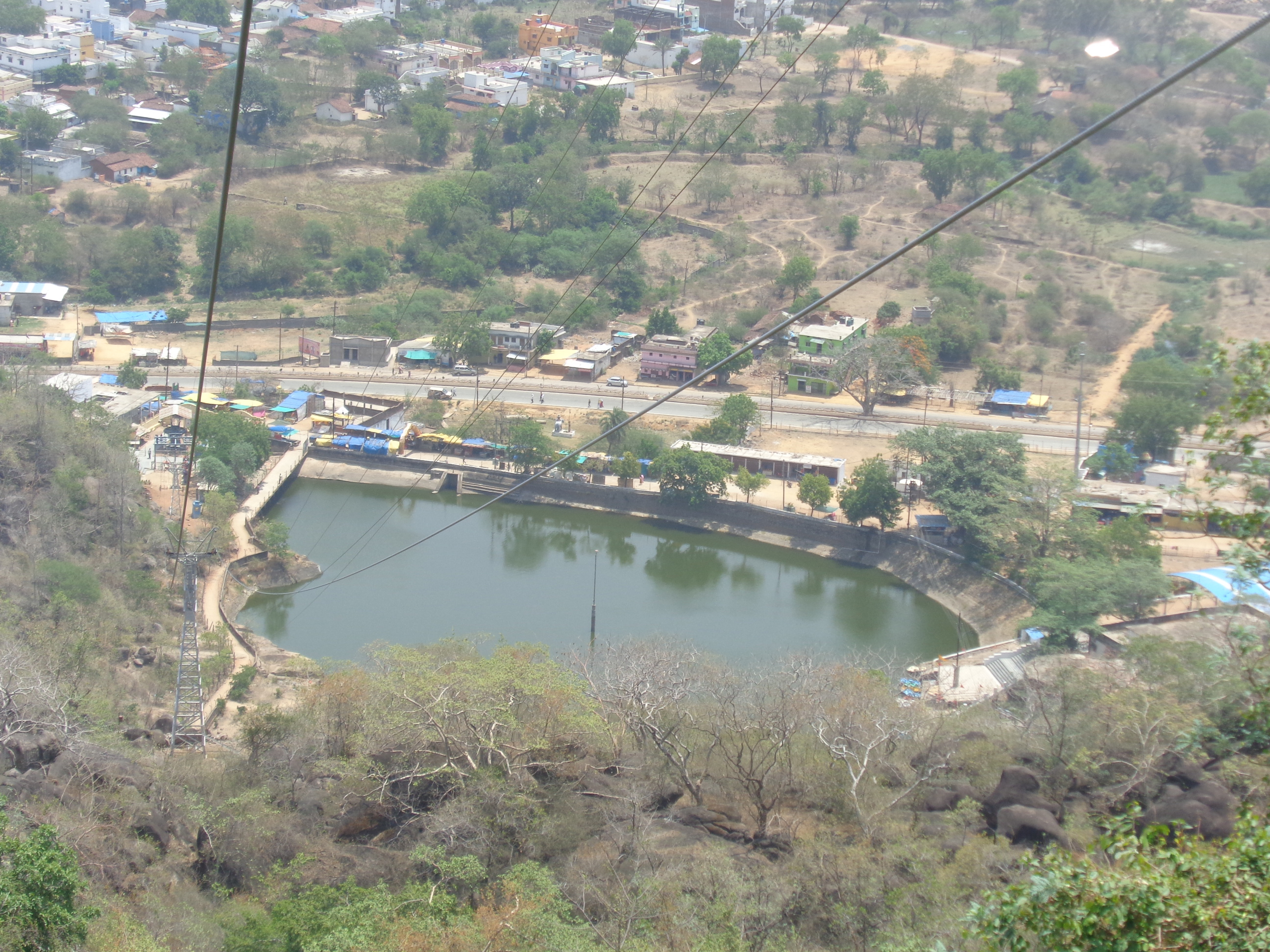
View of the pond in front of the temple

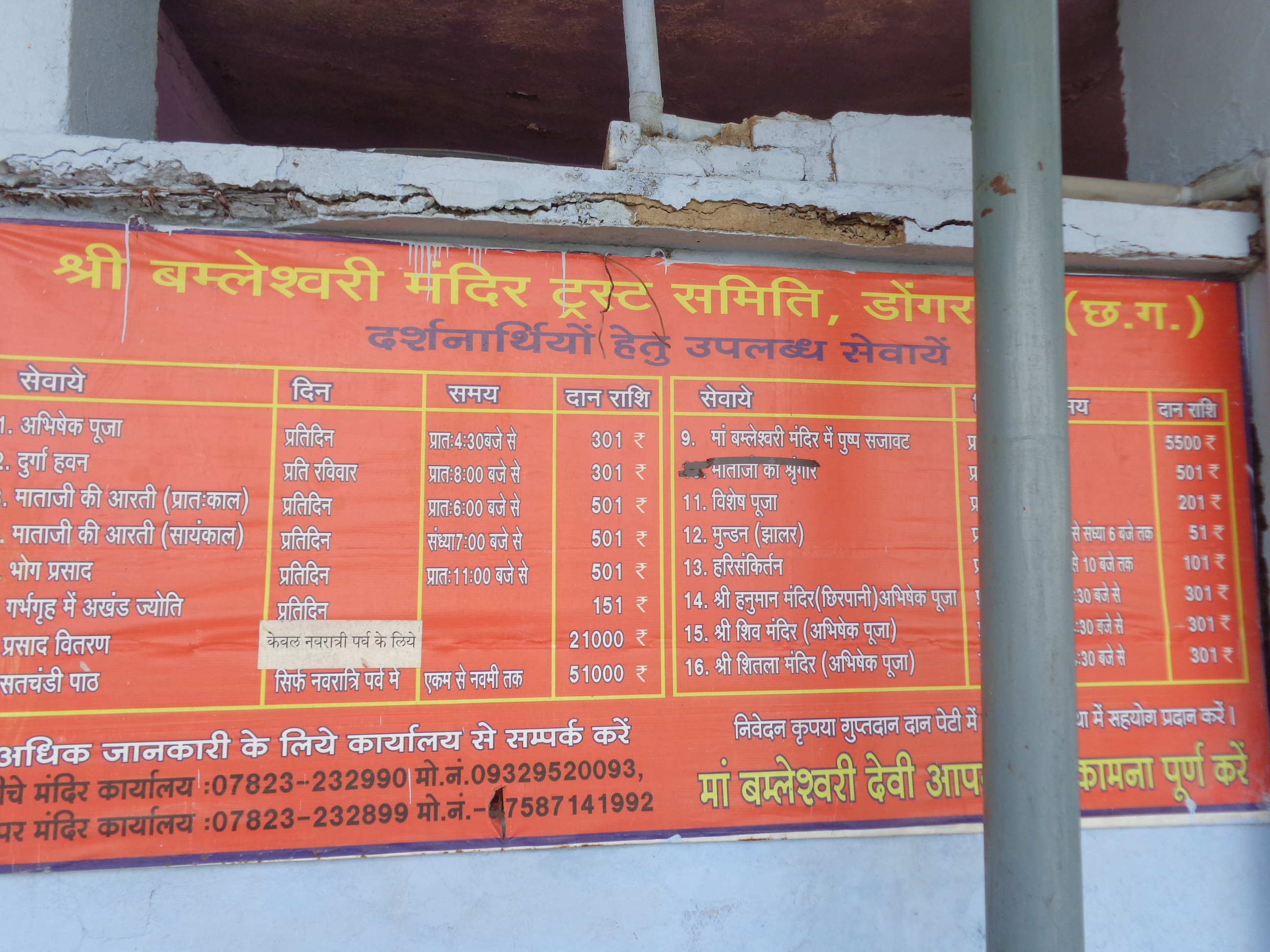
Poster of place and offerings in the temple

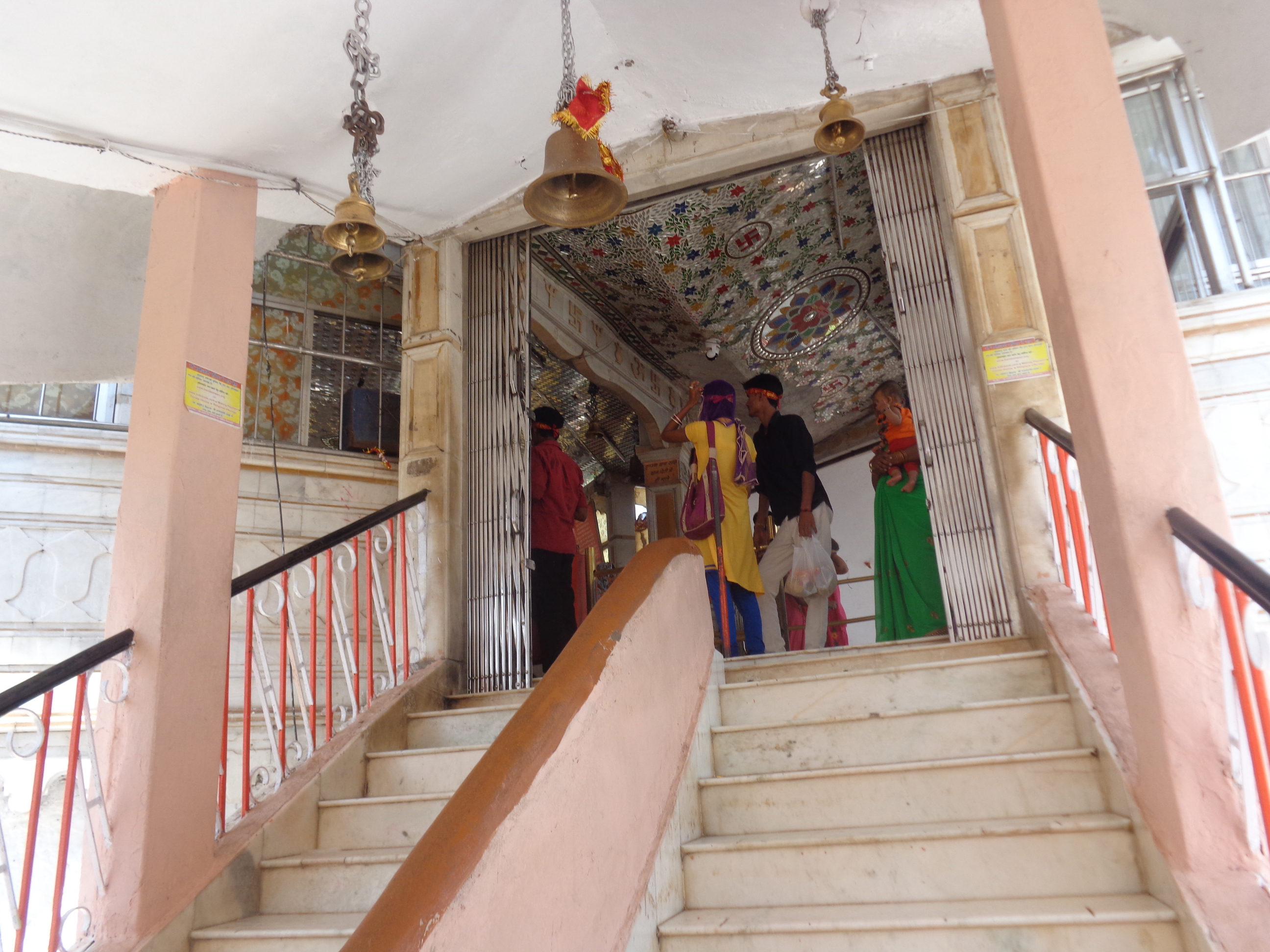
Way to Bambleshwari Temple

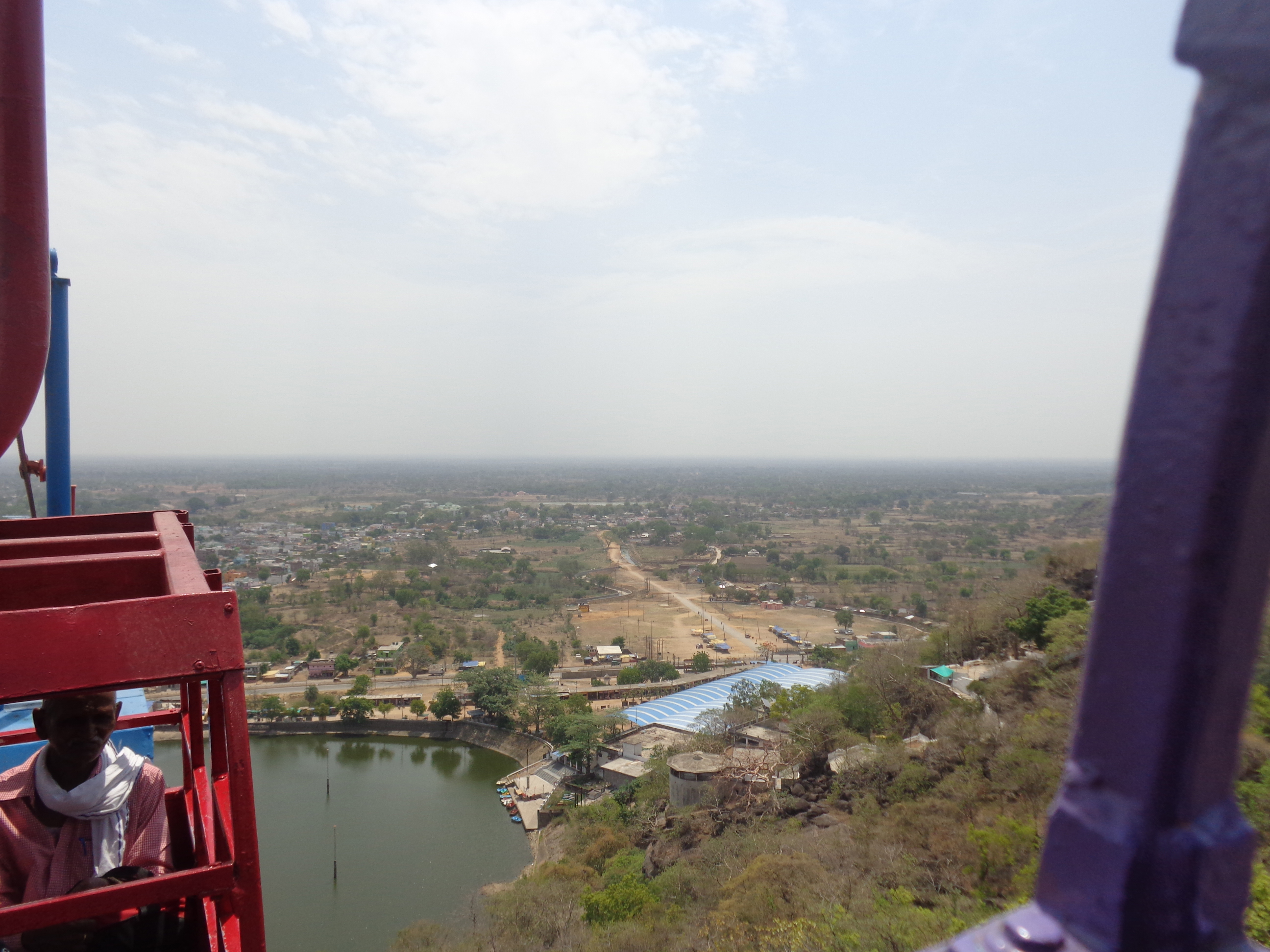
View of Dongargarh from Bambleshwari Temple

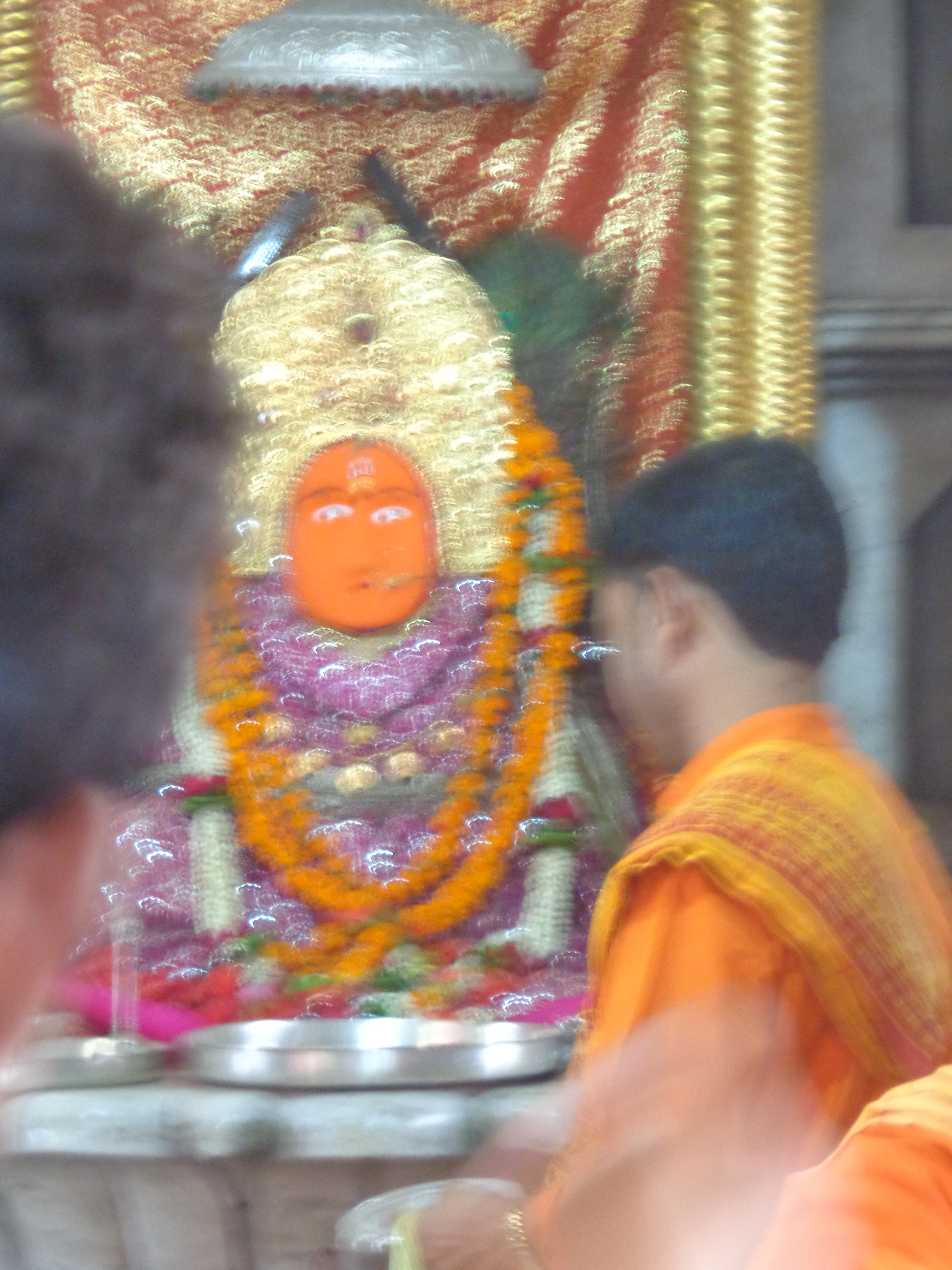
Devi Bambleshwari

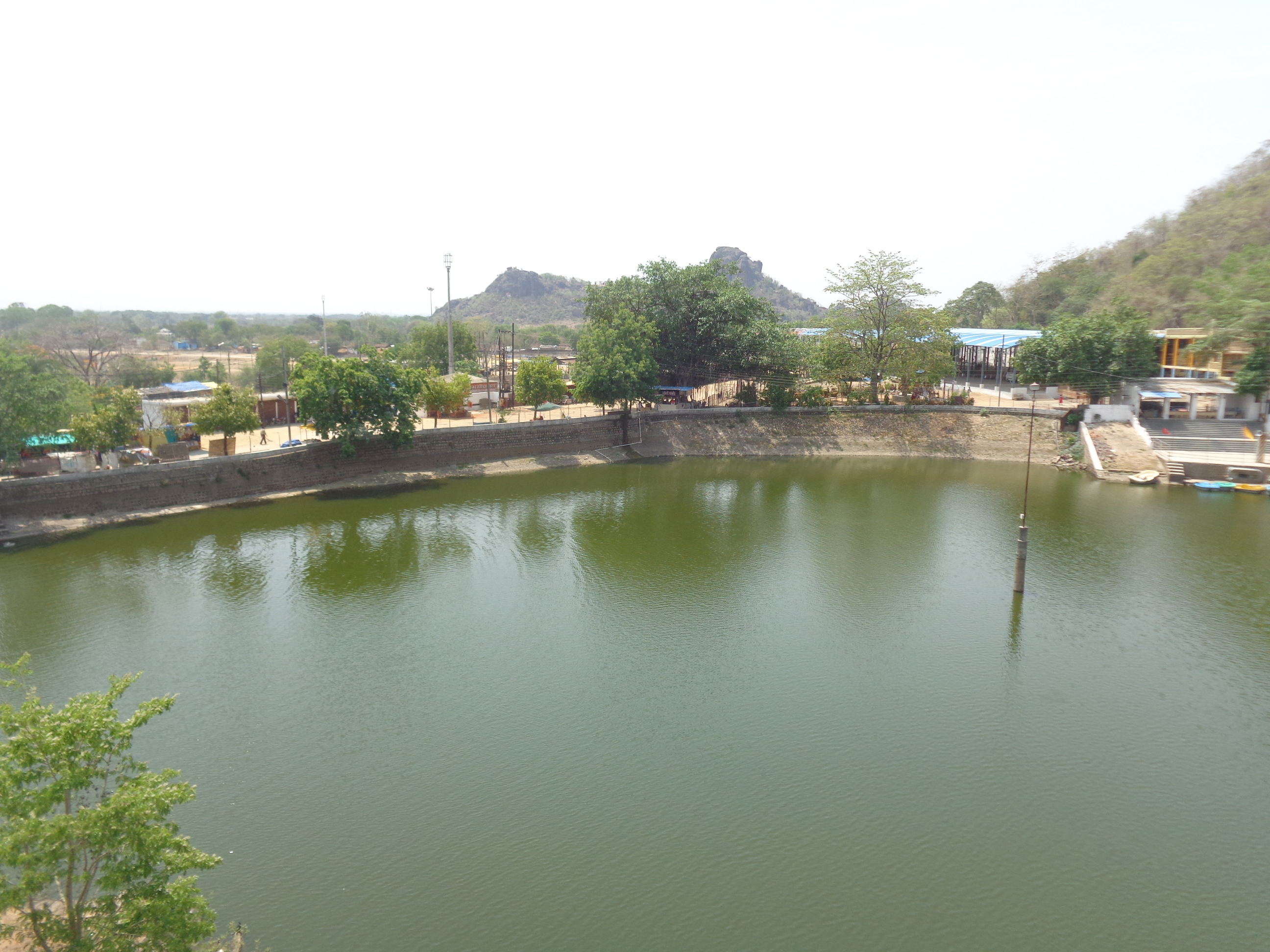
view of Dongargarh from Bambleshwari Temple

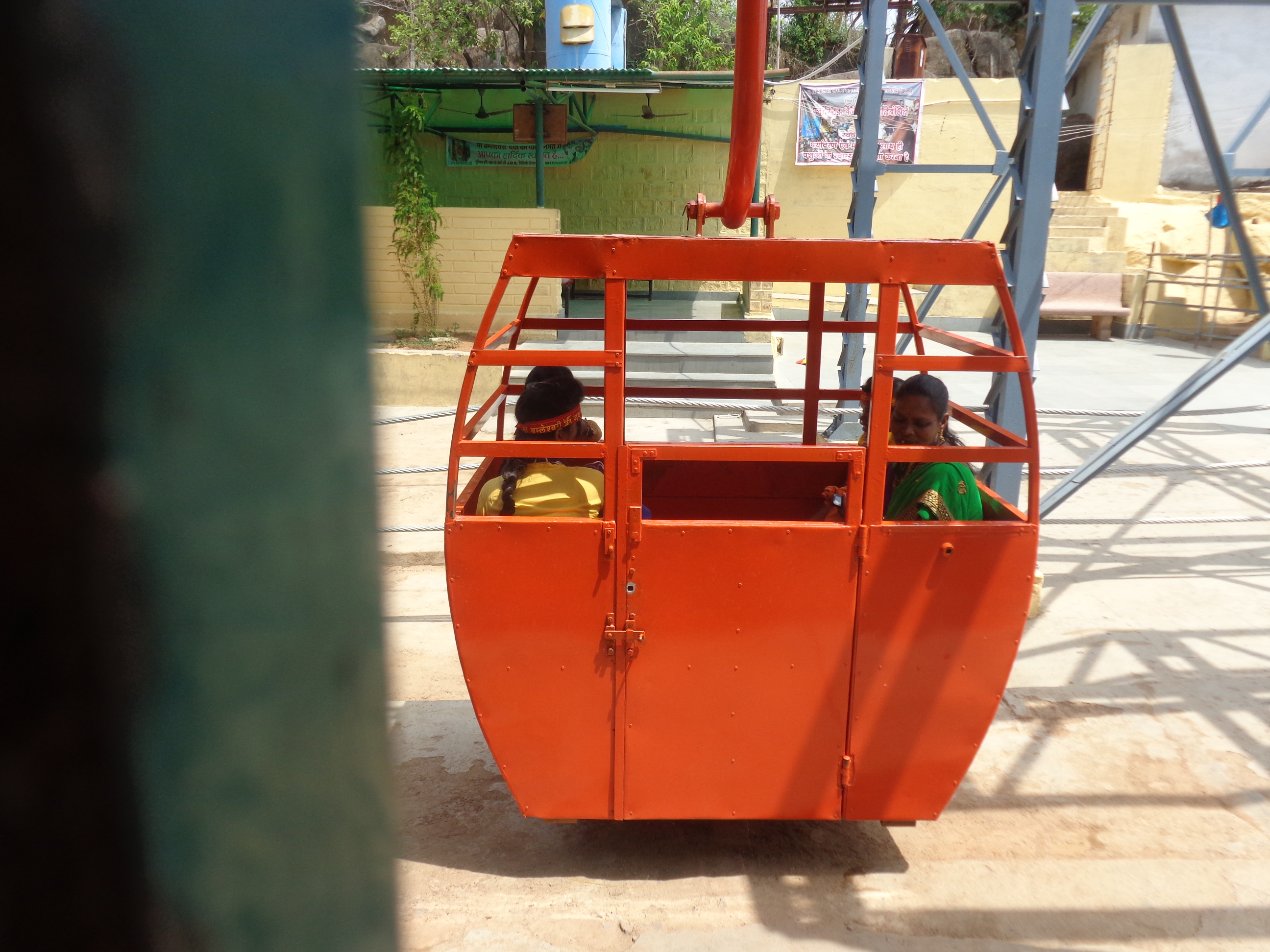
ropeway of Dongargarh from Bambleshwari Temple

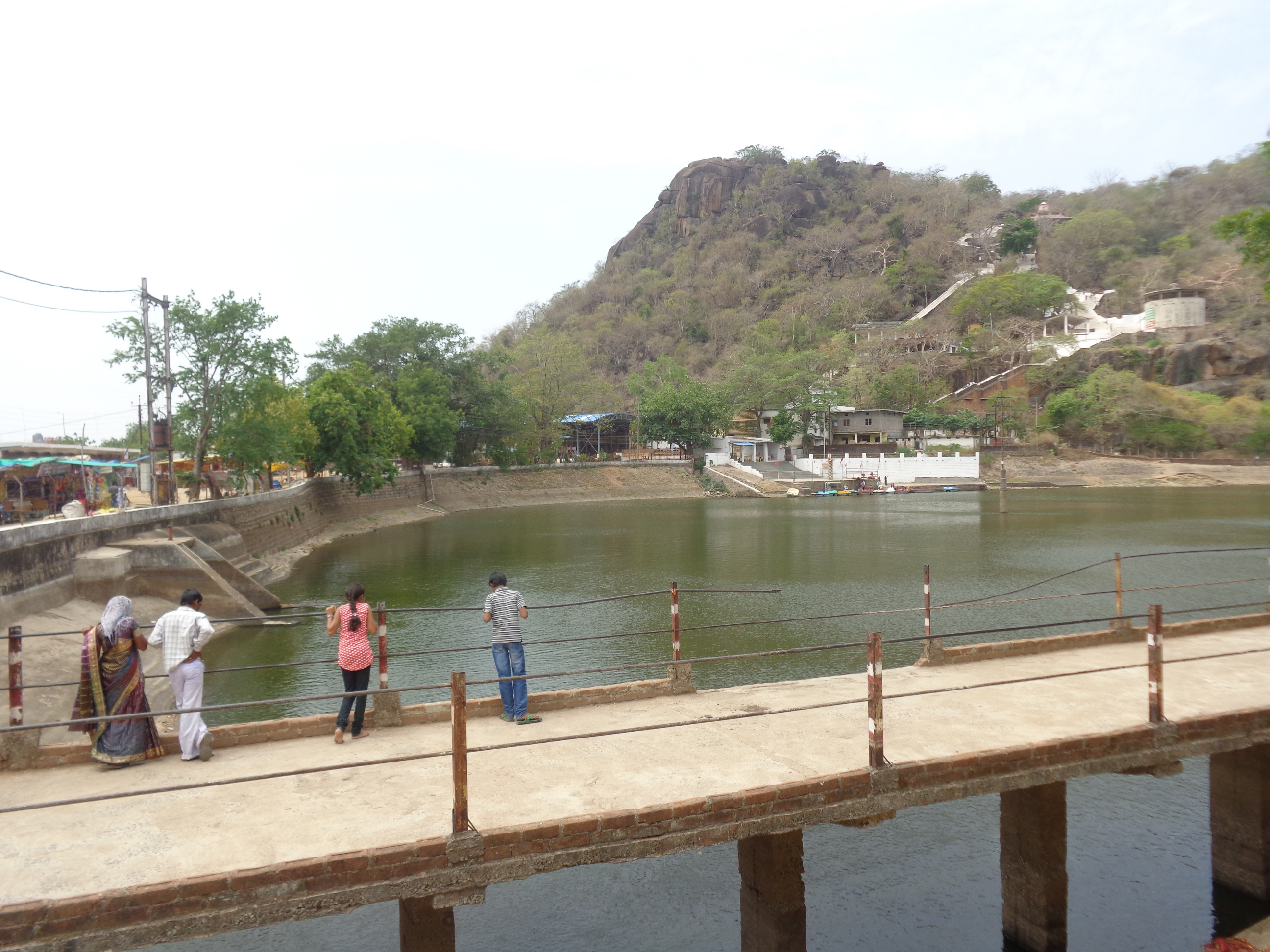
Passage from Dongargarh to Bambleshwari Temple

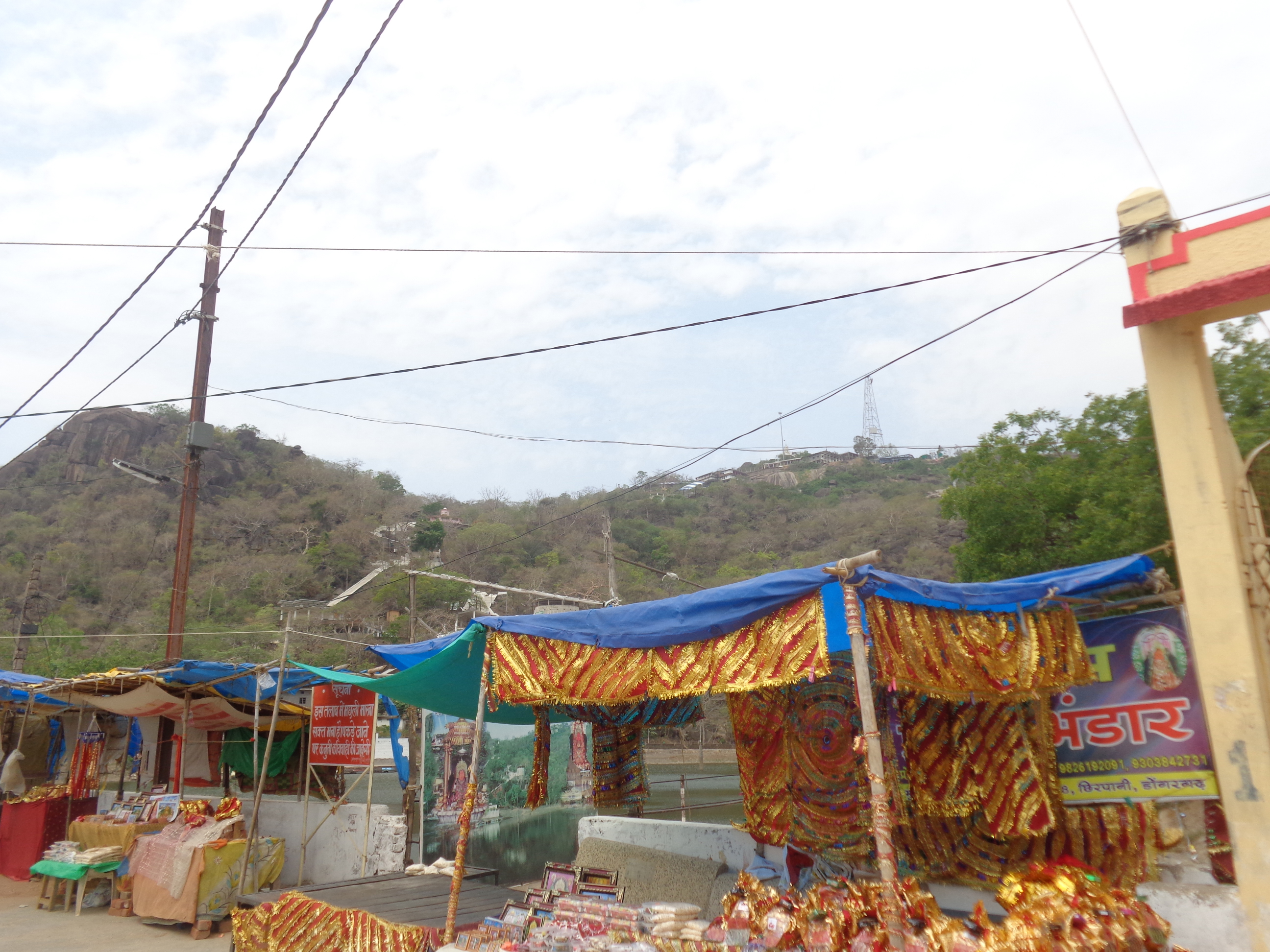
Town Dongargarh
