= Jyoti Kalash =

Earthen lamps upon pots used in Hindu veneration

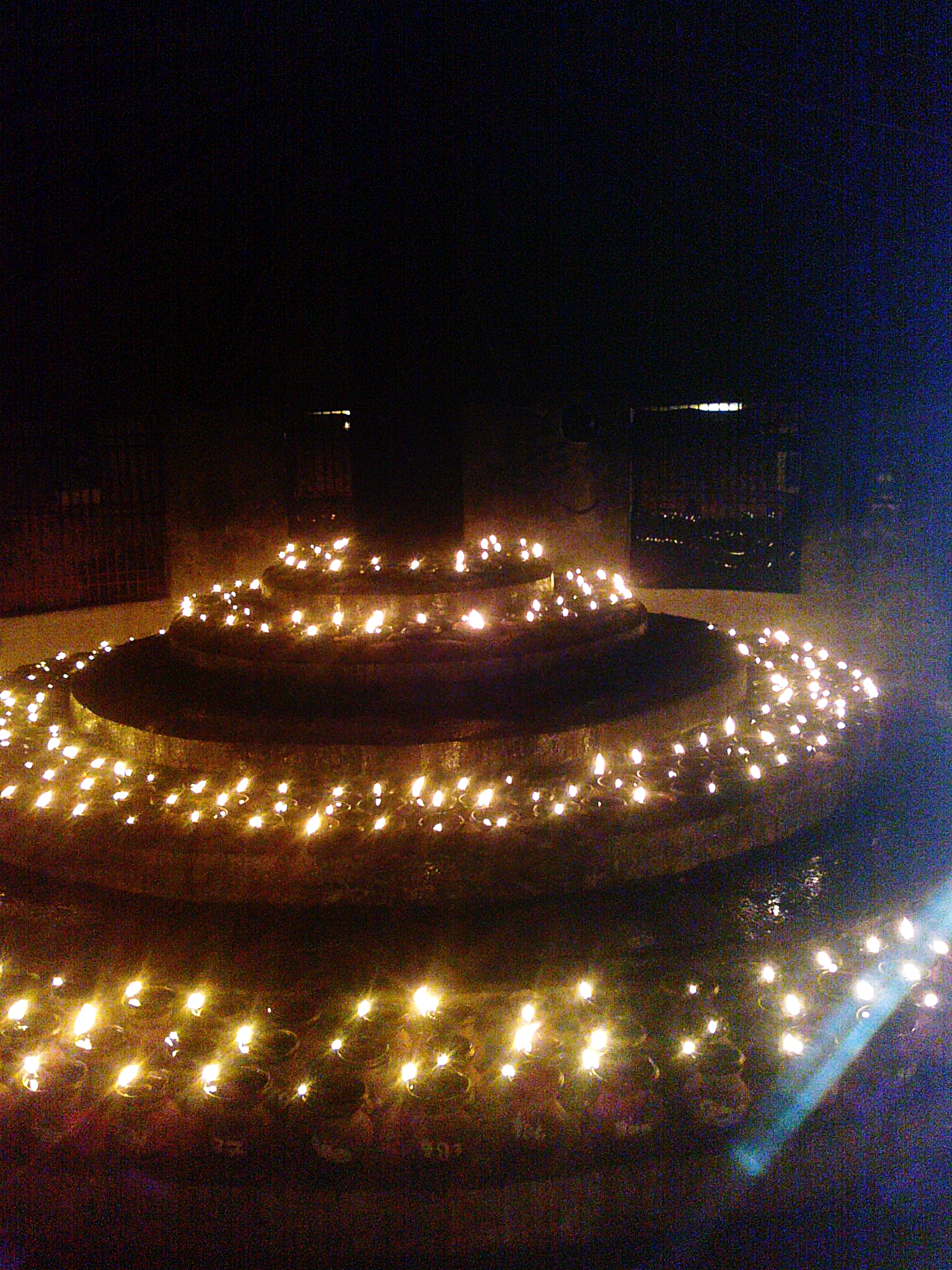
Display of jyoti kalashas, Adbhar

Jyoti Kalasha (Sanskrit: ज्योतीकलश, romanized: jyotikalaśa) is a symbolic representation of Hindu goddess Durga. During the Navaratri festival, devotees light jyoti kalashas in the temples of the goddess to appease her.

== Etymology ==
The term jyoti kalasha comes from a combination of two Sanskrit words - jyoti (light/lamp) and kalasha (metal pot).

== Description ==
A jyoti kalasha consists of earthen lamps (diyas) lit with ghee, which are placed on earthen pots (kalasha), covered with earthen lid. The fire (jyoti) burns continuously for nine days and nights of Navaratri, symbolising the divine presence of mother goddess on earth during nine days of Navaratri. Surrounding the main temple are many big halls where jyoti kalashas, lit by the devotees are kept for nine days, which are supervised by volunteers, who keep feeding the lamps with ghee for nine days.

Many people install jyoti kalashas at their home also during Navaratri. The procession of jyoti kalasha is taken out on ninth and final day of festival to immerse the jyoti kalashas in river or other water bodies.

The jyoti kalasha procession can be seen in Rajasthan Uttar Pradesh, Madhya Pradesh and especially in Chhattisgarh, where the festival and installation of jyoti kalasha is very popular and people throng the temples of Bambleshwari, Danteshwari, Mahamaya, Maoli, Kankalin, Ashtabhuji Temple, Adbhar and many others to install the jyoti kalasha.

== See also ==
- Diya
