= Mahamaya Temple =

Hindu temple in Bilaspur, Chhattisgarh, India

Coordinates: 22.2884°N 82.1599°E

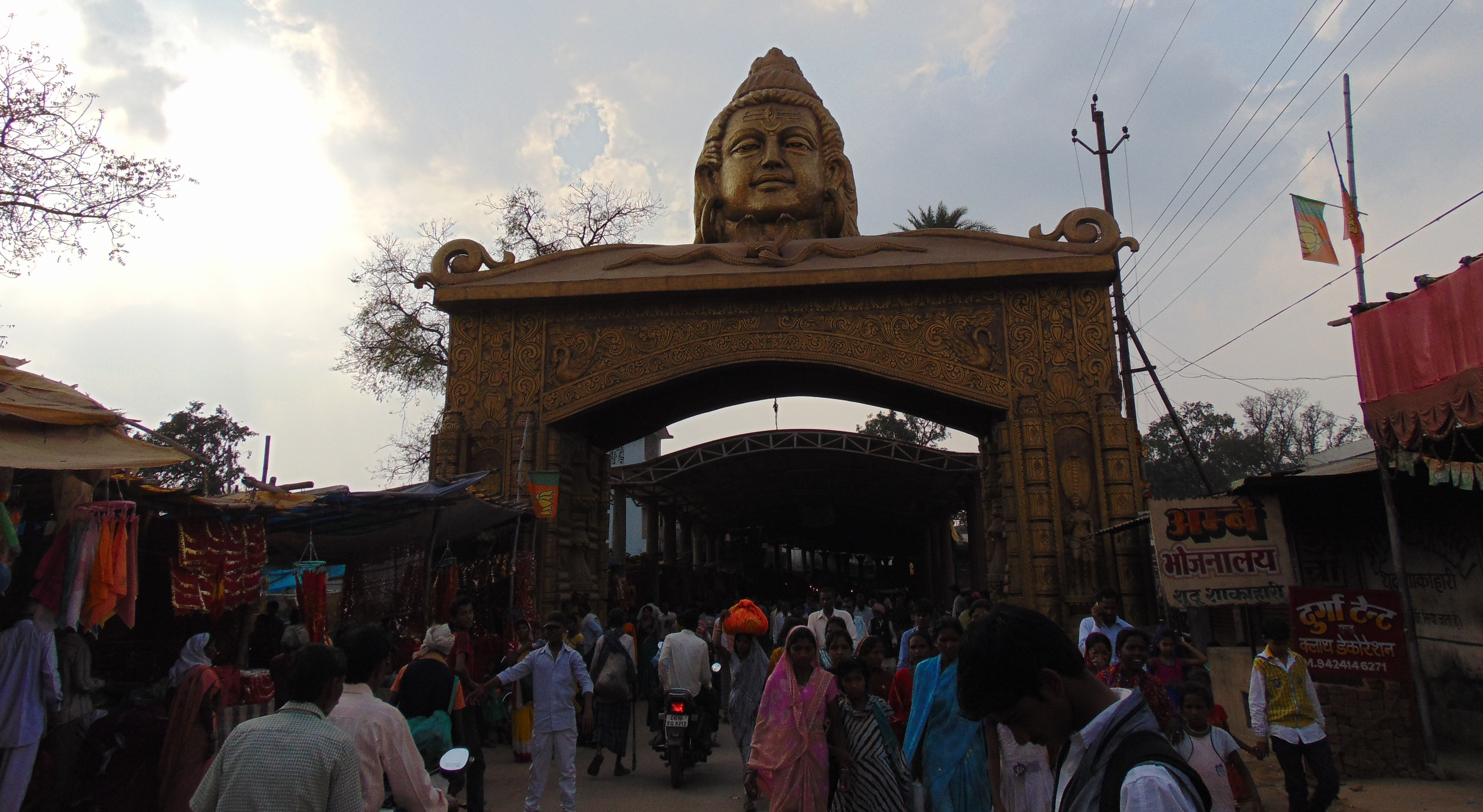
- Temple entrance

- Location in Chhattisgarh Mahamaya Temple (India) Mahamaya Temple (Asia)

Religion
- Affiliation: Hinduism
- District: Bilaspur
- Deity: Durga

Location
- Location: Ratanpur
- State: Chhattisgarh
- Country: India

Architecture
- Type: Hindu temple architecture (Nagara Style)
- Creator: Kalachuri King Ratnadeva
- Completed: 12-13th century CE, renovated by Archaeological Survey of India

Website
- www.mahamayaratanpur.com

Mahamaya Temple is a Hindu temple, dedicated to Goddess Durga, Mahalaksmi located at Ratanpur of Bilaspur district in Chhattisgarh, India and is one of the 52 Shakta pithas, shrines of Shakti, the divine feminine, spread across India. Ratanpur is a small city, full of temples and ponds, situated around 25 km from district Bilaspur of Chhattisgarh.Goddess Mahamaya is also known as Kosaleswari, presiding deity of old Daksin Kosal region (modern Chhattisgarh state).

== History ==
Built in the 12–13th century, the temple is dedicated to the Goddess Mahamaya. It was built during the reign of Kalachuris of Ratnapura. It is said to be located at the spot where king Ratnadeva had a darshan of goddess Kali.

Originally the temple was for three goddesses viz Maha Kali, Maha Lakshmi and Maha Saraswati. Later, Maha Kali left the old temple. Still later, a new (current) temple was built by king Bahar Sai which was for goddess Maha Lakshmi and goddess Maha Saraswati. This temple was built in vikram samvat 1552 (1492 CE). There are ponds near the temple. There are also temples of Shiva and Hanuman within the campus. Traditionally Mahamaya is the Kuldevi of Ratanpur state. The temple has been renovated by the architecture department. Mahamaya temple is situated at Ratanpur, 25 km from district headquarters Bilaspur, Chhattisgarh.

== Architecture ==
The Mahamaya temple is built in Nagara style of architecture facing north beside a huge water tank. One can see the scores of ancillary temples, domes, palaces and forts now, which once housed the temple and the royal house of Ratanpur Kingdom.

Within the complex, there is also temple of Kantideval, which is oldest of the cluster and is said to have been built by a build ascetic named Santosh Giri in 1039, later expanded by Kalchuri King Prithivideva II in the 15th century. It is having four gates and beautiful carvings. It has also been restored by Archaeological Survey of India. The sanctum and the mandapa are fortified with a fascinated courtyard, which was built in Maratha period in the late 18th century.

A few kilometers away there are ruins of ancient 11th century old Kadeideol Shiva temple located on a hill top of ruined fort, built by Kalchuri rulers, who were followers of Shiva & Shakti. This temple is also being planned for restoration by the archaeological department.

People throng the temple during Navaratri festival, when Jyotikalash is lit to appease the mother goddess.

The guardian of the temple is considered to be Kalbhairva, whose temple is located on the approach road to the temple on the highway. It is a popular belief that pilgrims who visit Mahamaya temple also need to visit the temple of Kalabhairava to complete their pilgrimage.

== Administration ==
Shri Mahamaya Devi Mandir is managed by a trust, consisting of 21 distinguished trustees, who are responsible for the well-being of the Mandir, its architecture, day-to-day management, finances and administration. The Trust – Sidh Shakti Peeth Shri Mahamaya Devi Mandir Trust – is a non-profit organisation, registered with the registrar of firms and societies. The trust also carries out various social activities for the well-being of the poor and disabled sectors of the society. Thakur Balram Singh remained the President of the Trust since its establishment on 5 March 1982 and thus served Shri Mahamaya Devi Mandir for 37 years and 54 days. Currently, Ashish Singh Thakur has been elected and serving as the President of the Trust.
