= Bimbaji Bhonsle =

Subahdar of Chhattisgarh from 1758 to 1787

- Subahdar; King of Ratanpur
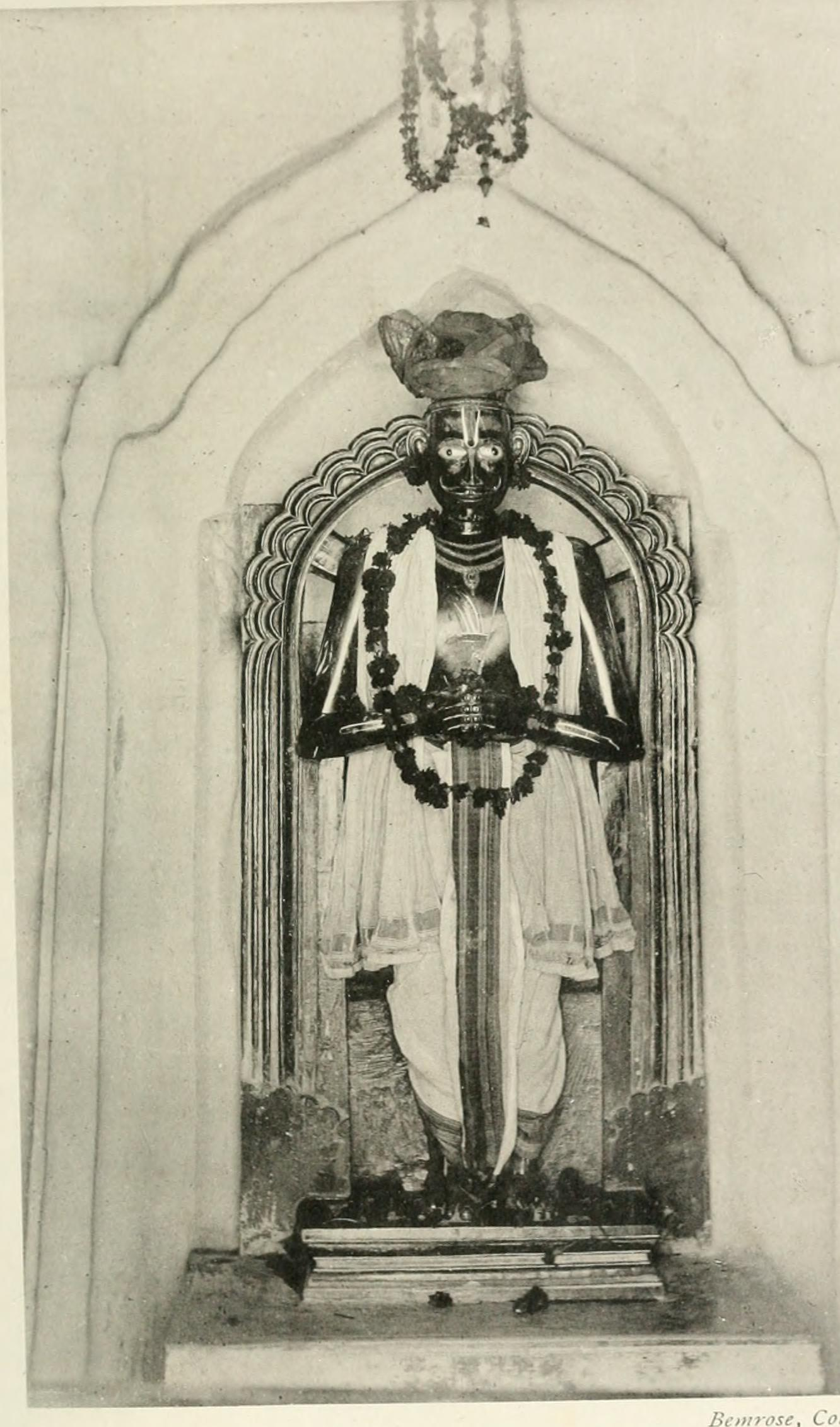

Subahdar of Chhattisgarh
- Reign: 1758–1787
- Predecessor: Mohan Singh
- Successor: Chimnaji (second son of Mudhoji Bhonsle)
- Died: 1787
- Spouses: Anandibai
- House: Bhonsles of Nagpur
- Father: Raghoji I Bhonsle

Bimbaji Bhonsle (died 1787) was the youngest son of Raghoji I Bhonsle, the Maratha ruler of Nagpur. Bimbaji was the ruler of Chhattisgarh on behalf of the Maharaja of Nagpur. However, he was only nominally subordinate to the Maharaja of Nagpur, as he had a separate army and court with ministers at his capital of Ratanpur.

== Career ==
Bimbaji was the youngest son of Raghoji I Bhonsle, the Maratha ruler of Nagpur. Bimbaji married Anandibai, who continued to wield her influence in Chhattisgarh after her husband's death and caused small-scale unrest. Janoji I Bhonsle appointed him as the governor of Chhattisgarh in 1758. When Mohan Singh, the Haihayavanshi ruler of Chhattisgarh on behalf of Nagpur learnt about this, he prepared an army at Raipur to oppose Bimbaji but suddenly fell ill and died. Thus Bimbaji faced no opposition in assuming rule of the region.

Bimbaji maintained order in Chhattisgarh through military oppression. Bimbaji collected excess revenue in order to maintain the government, as well as to pay an annual tribute of 7,000 rupees to Nagpur. But this had disadvantageous effects as the revenue of the region dropped considerably from 8 lakhs. Bimbaji was constantly quarrelling with his nominal overlord at Nagpur, Janoji I, who was also his brother. During the First Anglo-Maratha War a Khilat was sent by the Peshwa to Mudhoji Bhonsle to invade Bengal and conquer East India Company's capital of Calcutta. Despite having all required assistance, the Raja of Nagpur was reluctant to receive the khilat. However, when Bimbaji learnt about this, he expressed his desire to invade and burn Calcutta, but never received any khilat in his lifetime. He governed Chhattisgarh from 1758 to 1787. After his death, the subah system was adopted in the region.
