= Raghuji I =

Raja of Nagpur from 1739 to 1755

- Senasaheb Subha (Note: English: Lord of the Provinces and the Army); Senadhurandhar (Note: English: A highly distinguished and capable military commander)
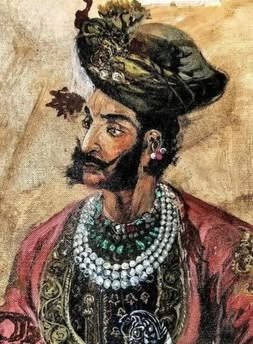
- Portrait of Raghuji Bhonsle

1st Raja of Nagpur
- Reign: 1739 – 14 February 1755
- Predecessor: Position established; (Burhan Shah as Gond ruler)
- Successor: Janoji I
- Born: Raghuji Bhonsle c. 1695: Satara, Maratha Kingdom; (modern day Maharashtra, India)
- Died: 14 February 1755 (aged 69–70): Nagpur, Maratha Empire; (modern day Maharashtra, India)
- Issue: Janoji I Mudhoji; Bimbaji; Sabaji
- House: Bhonsle (Nagpur)
- Father: Bimbaji
- Mother: Kashibai
- Religion: Hinduism
- Military career
- Conflicts: Second Maratha invasion of Bengal; Fourth Maratha invasion of Bengal; Siege of Barabati (1745); Battle of Naubatpur (1745)

Raghuji I (Raghuji Bhonsle, Marathi pronunciation: [ɾəɡud͡ʒi bʱoːsəleː]; 1695 – 14 February 1755) was a Maratha general credited with the Maratha expansion into Gondwana, Odisha, and Bengal, establishing Maratha supremacy in those areas of South Asia. He was granted the title of Senasaheb Subha, meaning "Lord of the Provinces and the Army", and a saranjam in the Vidarbha region by Shahu I. He is considered the founder of the Kingdom of Nagpur.

== Origin ==
The Bhonsale family branch of Raghuji were known as 'Hinganikar' as they were originally chiefs from Berdi (near Hingani in Pune District) established by Bimbaji Bhonsle. Ancestors of Raghuji—namely his great-granduncle Rupaji I, great-grandfather Mudhoji, grandfather Bapuji, and Bapuji's two brothers Sabaji and Parsoji—fought in the armies of Shivaji. Mudhoji resided in Pandavgad, ruling over a Mauza near Wai in Maharashtra, which Shivaji had granted to him as jagir for his spectacular exploits, while his brother Rupaji I resided at Bham in the district of Yavatmal.

As Rupaji I was childless, his property later passed to his brother Mudhoji; this subsequently gave Hinganikar Bhonsles a foothold in east Maharashtra for future conquests. Shivaji entrusted high military command and the collection of chauth (tribute) in Berar to the most distinguished of them. Mudhoji's son Sabaji was given villages of Rakhswari and Poorkikotar; however, it was Parsoji who attained highest position in the family. During Mughal–Maratha Wars Chhatrapati Rajaram Bhonsle bestowed the title of 'Senasahibsubha' (meaning 'Master of provinces and armies') on Parsoji Bhonsle along with rights to regions of Devgad, Gondwana, Chanda, and Varhad, from where he could exact tribute.

Bapuji only had one son, Bimbaji, who was the father of Raghuji I. Parsoji had three sons: Santaji, Kanhoji, and Ranoji, each of whom had a distinguished career. Santaji was part of various campaigns of Shivaji and the other commanders until his murder in Delhi during the 1719 campaign to depose Farrukhsiyar led by Senapati Khanderao Dabhade. Ranoji was given the title of 'Sawai Santaji' (meaning 'Superior Santaji') along with other compensations for the loss of his brother's life.

In 1722, Shahu I presented Badnera and Amravati to Ranoji Bhonsle, further extending the Hinganikar Bhonsles' presence in the east. Kanhoji went on to rule for 20 years, securing the family title of 'Senasahibsubha' and paving the way for future conquests. The less-prominent Bimbaji Bhonsle was without a son until one was finally born, who Bimbaji believed to be a result of prayers of a pious Vaishnava saint Ramajipant Kolhatkar. On those grounds Bimbaji named his son Raghuji (Raghava) after Rama, an avatar of Vishnu.

== Early life ==
Bimbaji died shortly after his son was born, and Raghuji grew up with his mother Kashibai and grandmother Baijabai at the same Pandavavadi near Wai. On attaining maturity Raghuji served under his uncle Ranoji as a shiledar (cavalryman) in Amravati, participating in various military operations. His uncle Senasahibsubha Kanhoji Bhonsle, based at Bham sixteen miles south of Yavatmal, invited him to his fief as he was heirless up to that point.

The city of Bham (or Bhambraja) was located on a small plateau near the Adan river, raised 300 ft. above the level of the valley. Today it is a vast but completely abandoned site of immense stone ruins and traces of planted trees. The original settlement was expansive, with a tradition of 5,000 houses owned by Bairagis (ascetics) alone under the protection of Marathas.

Senasahibsubha Kanhoji looked after and mentored Raghuji, who was the son of his cousin Bimbaji, with hopes of gradually passing his duties to him. But after the birth of his son Rayaji Bhonsle, his plans for adopting Raghuji ended and their relations were disrupted.

== Rise to power ==
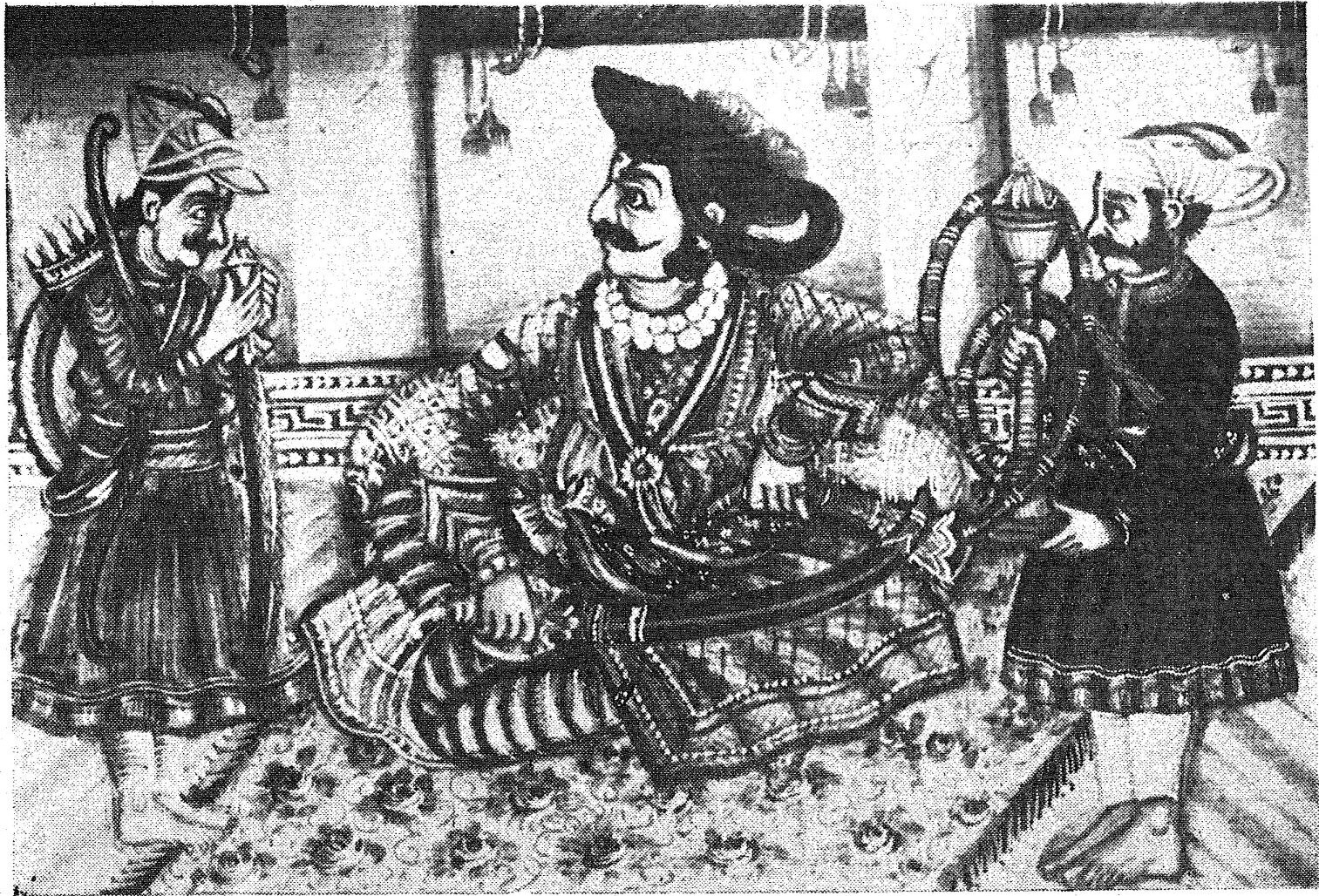
Raghoji I with his courtiers

Raghuji then left his uncle and travelled with 100 horsemen to offer his services to the Gond Kingdom of Devgad, then ruled by Chand Sultan, where he fought for many years and familiarised himself with local politics. Eventually Raghuji returned to Satara to directly serve the Chhatrapati Shahu Bhonsle. Raghuji's status dramatically escalated when he bravely slew a tiger that threatened Shahu's life during a hunting expedition. Shahu rewarded Raghuji, most importantly by arranging the marriage of his own Shirke clan wife Rani Sagunabai's sister Salubai to Raghuji. This further bound the Chhatrapati Bhonsle and the Senasahibsubha Bhonsle families.

This was simultaneously followed by the downfall of Senasahibsubha Kanhoji, who had entered into talks with the Nizam. For further examination he was invited by Shahu to Satara. On 23 August 1725 Kanhoji left Satara without permission, fleeing the officers sent after him. After three years of distant correspondence, Shahu finally appointed Raghuji as the new Senasahibsubha in 1728. Following Raghuji's appointment, Shahu granted him the sanads for Berar and Gondwana and the right to extend the levy of chauth to Chhattisgarh, Patna in Bihar, Allahabad in Awadh Subah and Maksudabad in Bengal Subah serving as directives for his conquests.

Raghuji's first campaign as Senasahibsubha was to bring his uncle Kanhoji to justice and restore centralization in the eastern provinces. He deployed an army of 30,000 cavalry. Raghuji's armies roved in all directions exacting the pending chauth and Sardeshmukhi, which served as return of central authority over the lands. In 1731 Raghuji Bhonsle killed Isa Khan and seized all the villages in Kherla as well as the Fort of Salbardi.

Raghuji followed this by defeating Shujayat Khan of Akola, the deputy of the Nawab of Ellichpur, and subjugating his territory. In this duration Kanhoji had prepared countermeasures by fortifying his base at Bham. Raghuji received the aid of his uncle Sawai Santaji Ranoji Bhonsle of Amravati. The two armies jointly besieged the fort of Bham and killed Kanhoji's general Tukoji Gujjar, who death broke Kanhoji's patience and he fled from the fort, closely pursued by the allied cavalry. Raghuji and Ranoji overtook Kanhoji at Mandar near Yavatmal and defeated him in the fight. Kanhoji was imprisoned in the fort of Satara while his son Rayaji continued at Bham.

Tensions regarding Rayaji and Raghuji's rights as Senasahibsubha ended only by 1748 when Rayaji died childless, thus ensuring the supremacy of Raghuji Bhonsle's line. Shahu Chhatrapati then bestowed the authority to impose chauth and mokasa of prominent Mughal cities and regions like Lucknow, Allahabad in Awadh, Murshidabad in Bengal Subah, Berar (claimed by Nizam), Bitia in Malwa Subah, Hajipur and Patna in Bihar Subah (under Nawab of Bengal Subah), and of the Gond Kingdoms of Devagad, Gadha, Bhavargad, and Chanda. This ensured the direction of Raghuji's future expansions.

== Military campaigns ==
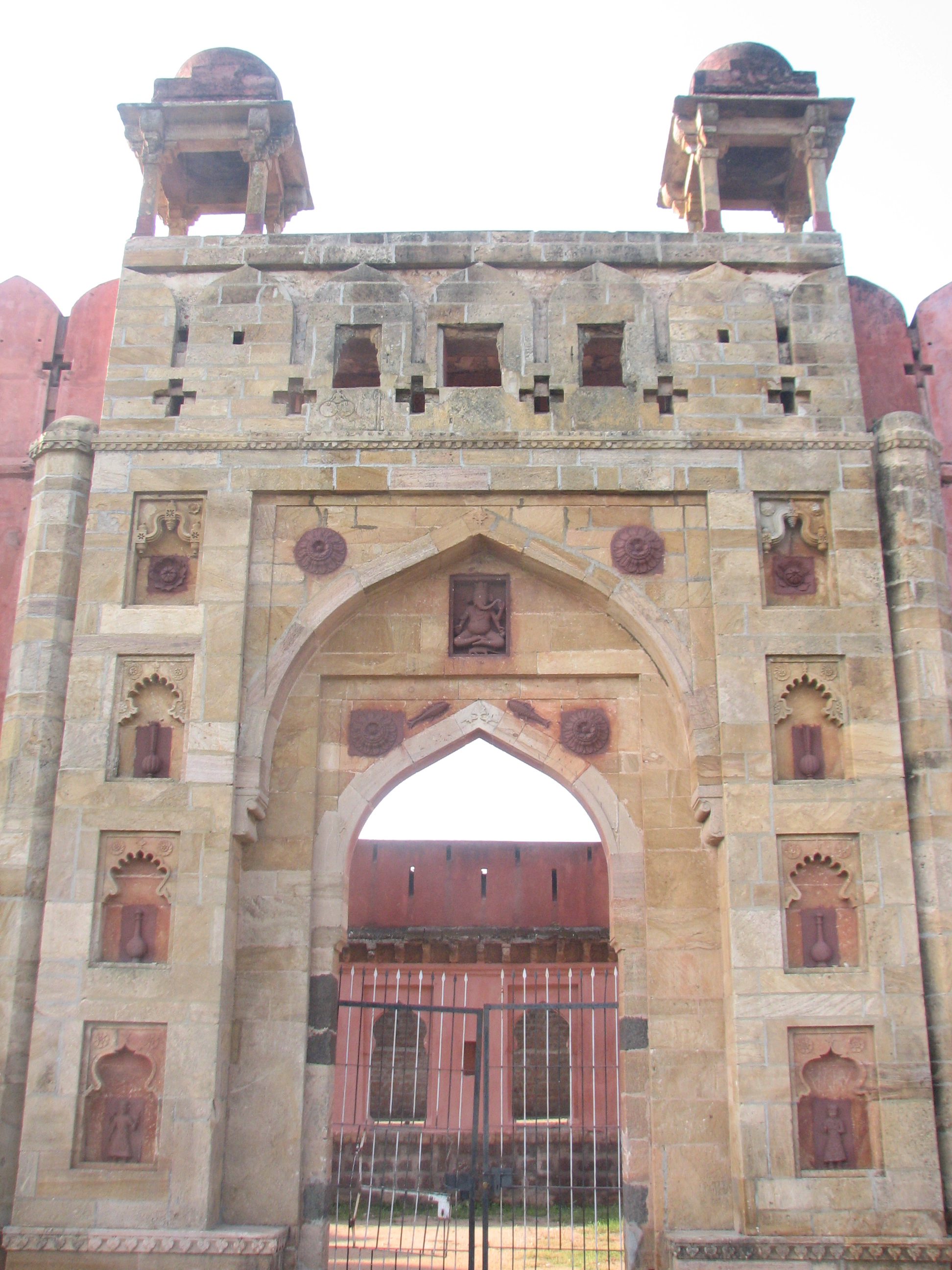
Main entrance of the Nagardhan Fort near Nagpur city, commissioned by Raghoji Bhonsale

Bold and decisive in action, Raghuji was an archetypical Maratha leader; he saw in the troubles of other states an opening for his own ambition, and did not even require a pretext for invasion. Twice his armies occupied Bengal, and it was he who attained the conquest of Cuttack. Chanda, Chhattisgarh, and Sambalpur were added to his dominions between 1745 and 1755, the year of his death. He was succeeded by his son Janoji Bhonsle.

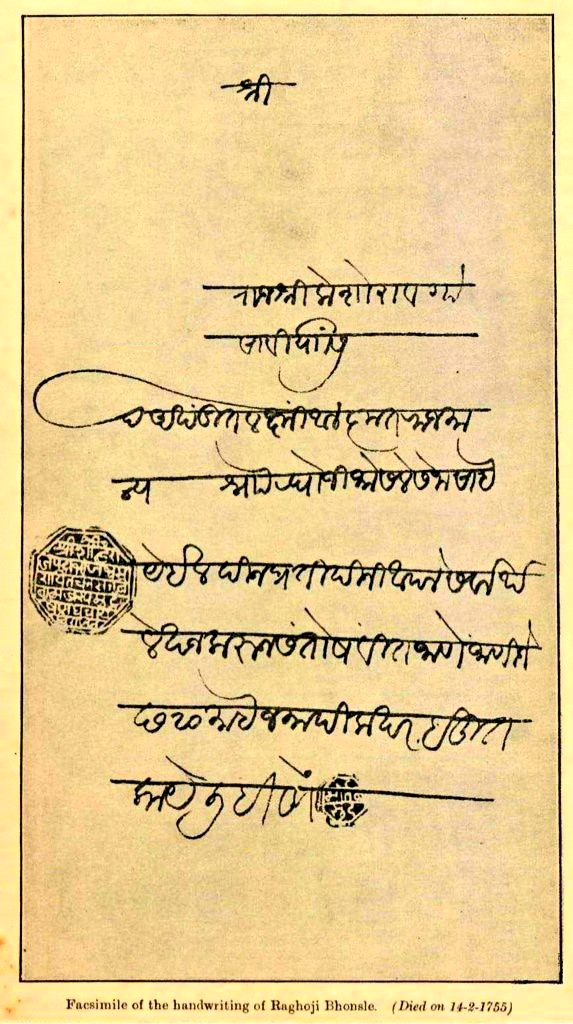
Seal, signature, and handwriting of Maratha Senadhurandar Sarkar Senasahibsubha Raghuji Bhonsle I of Nagpur

=== Campaigns in South India ===
The Nawab of Carnatic Dost, Ali Khan, sent his son Safdar Ali and Husayn Dost Khan (better known as Chanda Sahib) to extort tribute from the Hindu states of Deccan. Through treachery Chanda brought about the abdication of the queen of Tiruchirappalli. After entering the fort by swearing on the Quran sacred oaths of peace and behaving like a brother to the widowed queen, Husayn facilitated the storming of the fort by having his men enter through the adjoining palace known as Dilwar Mandap. Heartbroken on such betrayal the widowed queen burnt herself in disgrace.

The extension of the Muslim power in the far south had set in motion a Hindu reaction led by Vangaru Tirumala, a member of the Madurai Nayak dynasty and a former rival of queen Minakṣhi, and Sayaji Bhonsle, the deposed Maratha ruler of Tanjore, who appealed for aid to Chhatrapati Shahu, the most powerful Hindu ruler at the time. Hindu Kingdoms such as Ramnad, Sivaganga, Pudukkottai, and the Kingdom of Mysore called upon the Marathas for intervention, and offered cooperation against the Arcot Nawab. They demanded the expulsion of the Navayet Nawabs. Even the Nizam supported Maratha intervention against them.

Pratapsingh Bhonsle of Tanjore was neither regular in the payment of tribute nor obedient to the Subehdar, causing the Nawab to remove him from Tanjore by force and install a Muslim deputy. Finally incensed by the atrocities of the Nawab, Shahu deployed Raghuji Bhonsle of Nagpur and Fatehsingh Bhonsle of Akkalkot with army of 40,000 to wreak vengeance on the wrongdoers. Raghuji defeated the Nawab of Cuddappah, exacted tribute from the Nawab of Karnool, and advanced southwards into the subah of Arcot.

=== Battle of Damalcherry Pass ===
The rapid advance of the Marathas filled the Nawab Dost Ali Khan with dismay. Soon afterwards, on May 20, 1740, the Battle of Damalcherry took place, which was a major confrontation between the Nawab of the Carnatic, Dost Ali Khan of Arcot, and the Maratha Senasahibsubha Raghuji I Bhonsle of Nagpur. The battle was a victory for the Marathas in which Dost Ali Khan, his son, and nearly all his officers were killed. Dost Ali Khan's diwan Mir Assud was taken captive. The Nawab's capital city of Arcot was plundered and the rich treasures were taken as booty by the triumphant Marathas. The news of this defeat spread dismay and consternation in the country. Safdar had by then only reached Arcot. He started negotiations for a truce with the Marathas through Mir Assud who was in captivity in the Maratha camp. The Marathas were disappointed by the desolate condition of the country and many in the circles were ready to come to terms. Raghuji however demanded a high fee for sparing Chanda Sahib, who offered only seven lakhs with a statement threatening to continue the conflict if the terms were rejected.

=== Siege of Trichinopoly ===
Raghuji discarded the meagre offer and deployed his men against Tiruchirappalli. The main body of the Maratha cavalry took positions before the city and cut off its communications. Meanwhile, a large body of Nevayet troops under Chanda Sahib's brother Zaynut Abdul Khan, known as Bada Sahib, marched to the northern borders of their territory to prevent a total encirclement. The Maratha contingents attempted to intercept the march of Bada Sahib, but the flank of his brother Sadak Sahib defeated their stretched lines at Dindigul. The two then merged their forces and rushed to Tiruchirappalli to aid their brother but were intercepted by Raghuji at Manapparai. In the fierce battle which lasted for nine hours the Marathas emerged victorious. Raghuji killed Bada Sahib and Sadak Sahib with more than 3,000 men in each of their contingents slain. This decisive Maratha victory considerably helped their siege of Tiruchirappalli. Despite the formidable odds, Chanda Sahib resisted the onslaught for more than a month.

On the 16th of March 1741, the Marathas finally scaled the walls of the ramparts of Tiruchirappalli fort, surprised the garrison, and conquered the Nevayet stronghold. The fort was surrendered to Raghuji on the day of Ram Navami, but it was the banner of Fatehsingh Bhonsle which was raised on the fort. Chanda Sahib negotiated for peace by offering to pay twelve lakhs of rupees for his safe departure, but the Marathas demanded one crore. Eventually the talks broke down and the Marathas carried away the Husayn Dost Khan together with his son Abid Ali as prisoner to Berar and then to Satara. Raghuji appointed Murari Rao Ghorpade as the new ruler at Tiruchirappalli, which marked the end of the Nevayets and the culmination of the Maratha campaign.

According to Ramesan, it must have been at this time of his invasion in 1740, while in the Chittoor district and very near to Tirupati, that Raghuji took the opportunity to visit the Venkateswara temple and offer his obeisance to the deity with offerings of many valuable jewels. These jewels are still preserved in the temple in a chest known as "Raghojivari Pette".

=== Conquest of Chhattisgarh ===
Raghoji's Diwan Pandit Bhaskar Ram invaded and placed Mohansingh, an illegitimate son of Raghuji, in charge of the states of Raipur, Ratanpur, Bilaspur, and Sambalpur in Chhattisgarh before advancing on to Orissa.

=== Campaigns in Bengal and Odisha ===
The Maratha Empire undertook an expedition in Bengal after the successful campaign in Carnatic at the Battle of Trichinopolly. Raghoji led this expedition. Raghoji was able to annex Orissa permanently, as he successfully exploited the chaotic conditions prevailing in the region after the death of the Orissa governor Murshid Quli Khan in 1727. The Nawab of Bengal ceded territory up to the river Suvarnarekha to the Marathas, and agreeing to pay Rs. 20 lacs as chauth for Bengal (including both West Bengal and Bangladesh) and 12 lacs for Bihar (including Jharkhand); Bengal thus became a tributary of the Marathas.

=== Final takeover of Devagad ===
Dissensions continued between the Devgad Gond brothers and once again, the elder brother Burhan Shah requested the aid of Raghoji. Akbar Shah was driven into exile and finally poisoned at Hyderabad. However, this time Raghoji did not pass the opportunity of conquering such a plentiful and rich country.

He declared himself 'protector' of the Gond king. Thus in 1743, Burhan Shah was practically made a state pensionary, with real power being in the hands of the Maratha ruler. After this event the role of the Gonds in politics of the Deogarh region faded from history.

== Death and legacy ==
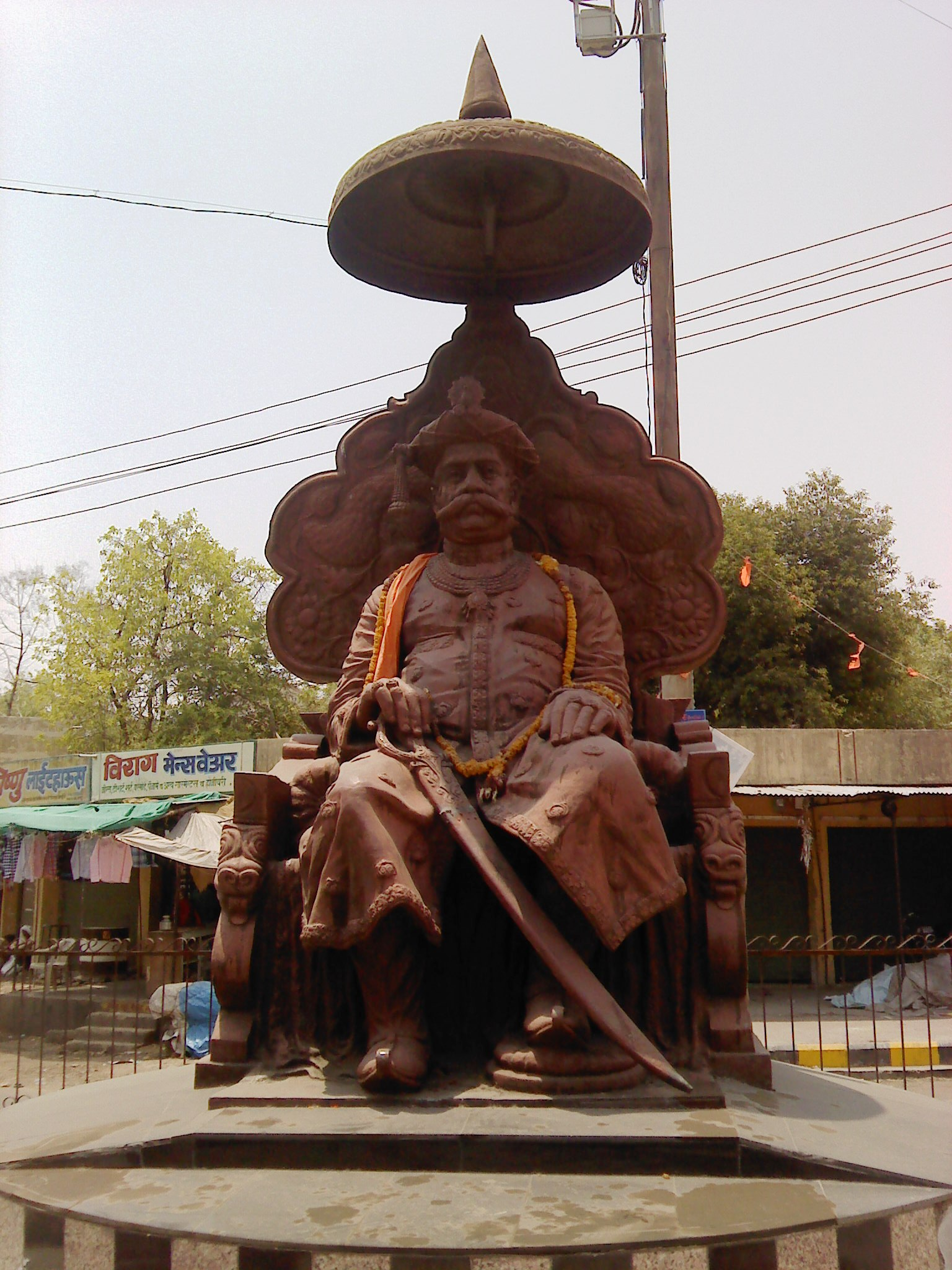
Statue of Raghuji I at Sakkardara Square

King of Nagpur Raghuji Bhonsle died on February 14, 1755. He left behind four legitimate sons—Janoji, Mudhoji, Sabaji, and Bimbaji—and one known natural son, Mohansingh.

== In popular culture ==
=== Films and television ===
- In the 2011-2012 Indian historical TV serial Veer Shivaji, he is portrayed by Rishabh Jain.

== Citations ==
Preceded by Raja Gond	King of Nagpur; 1739–1755	Succeeded by Janoji
