= Ratanpur, Chhattisgarh =

Historical town in Bilaspur (Chhattisgarh), India

Ratanpur
- Historical town
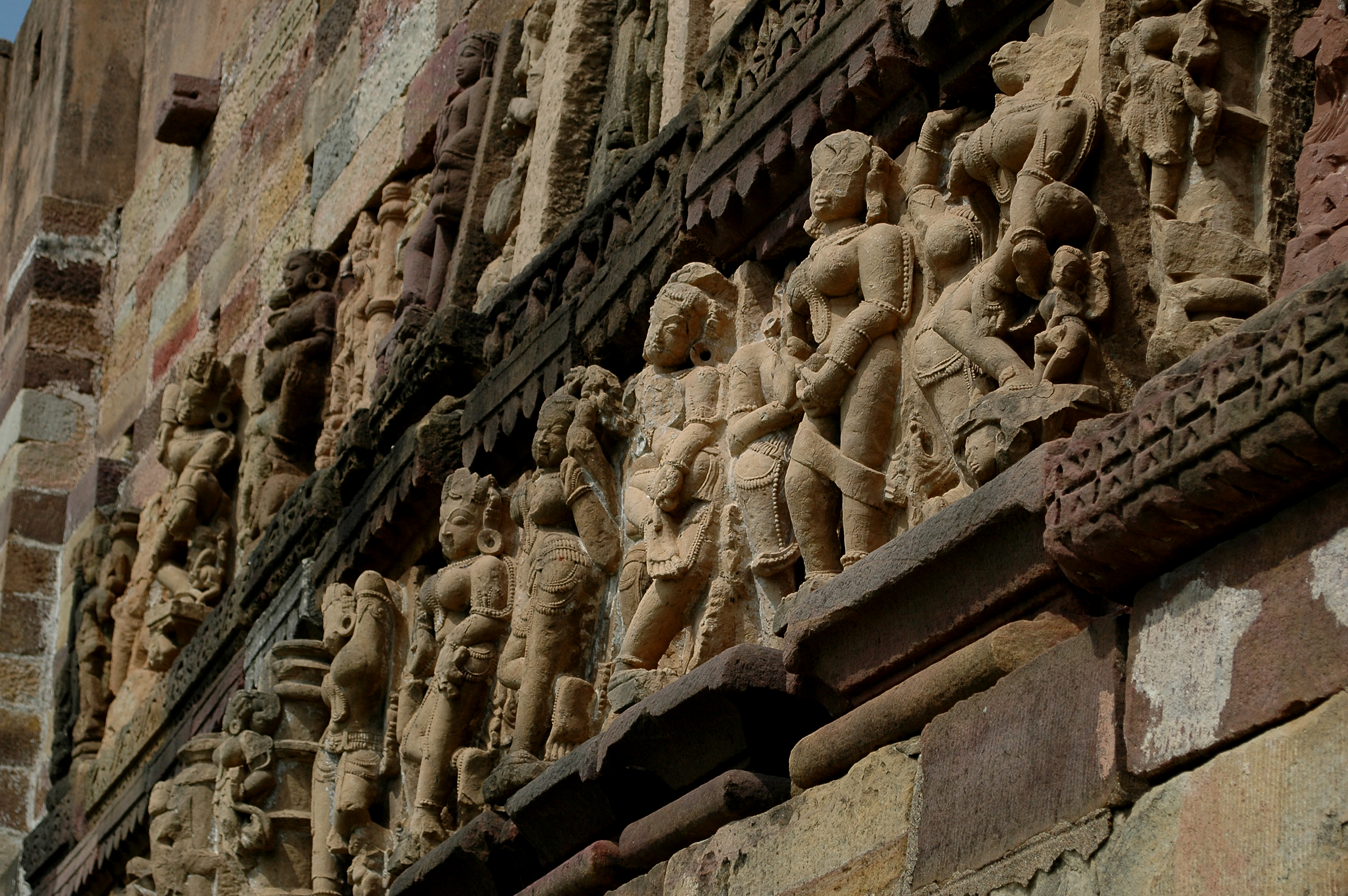
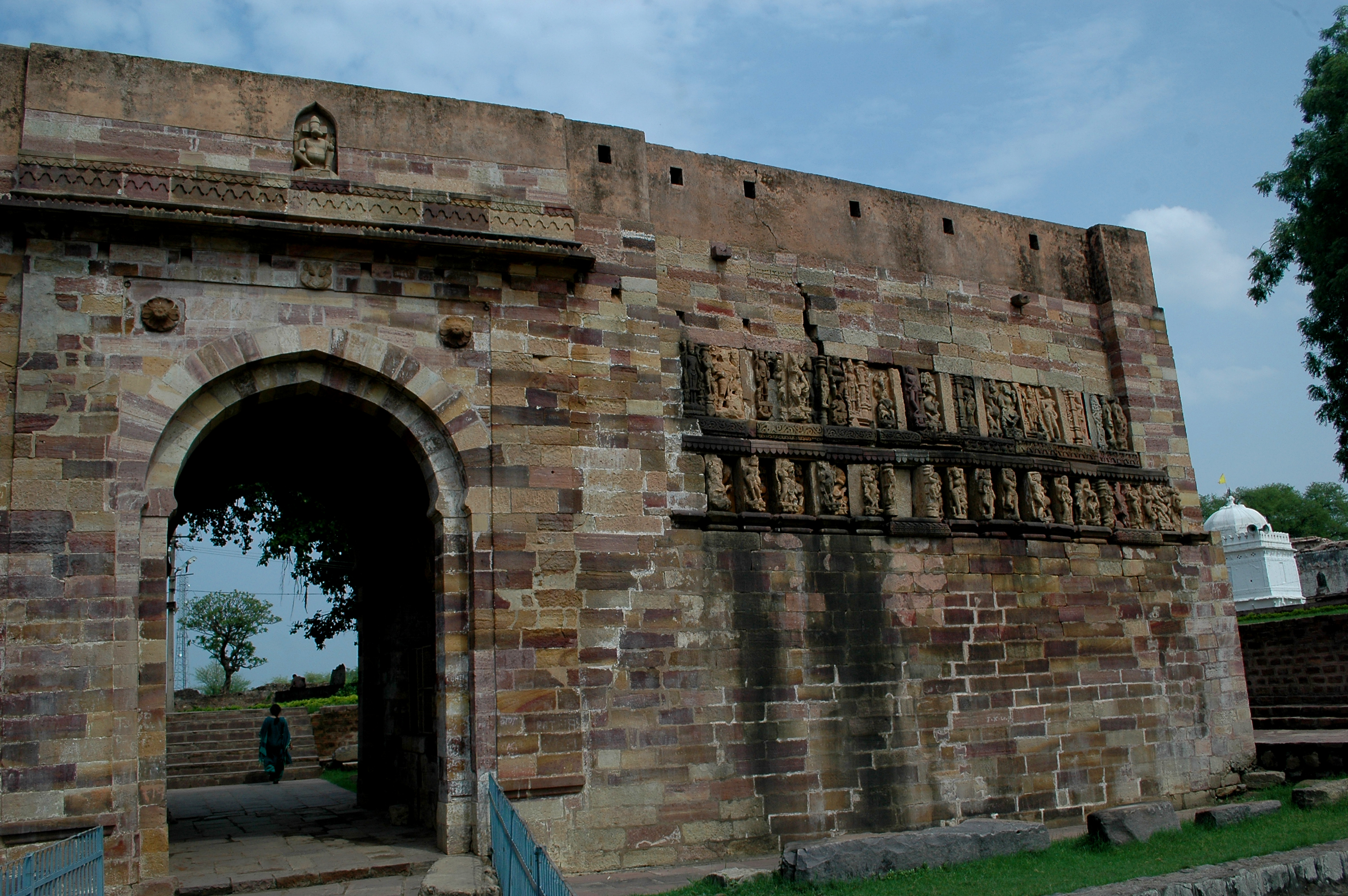
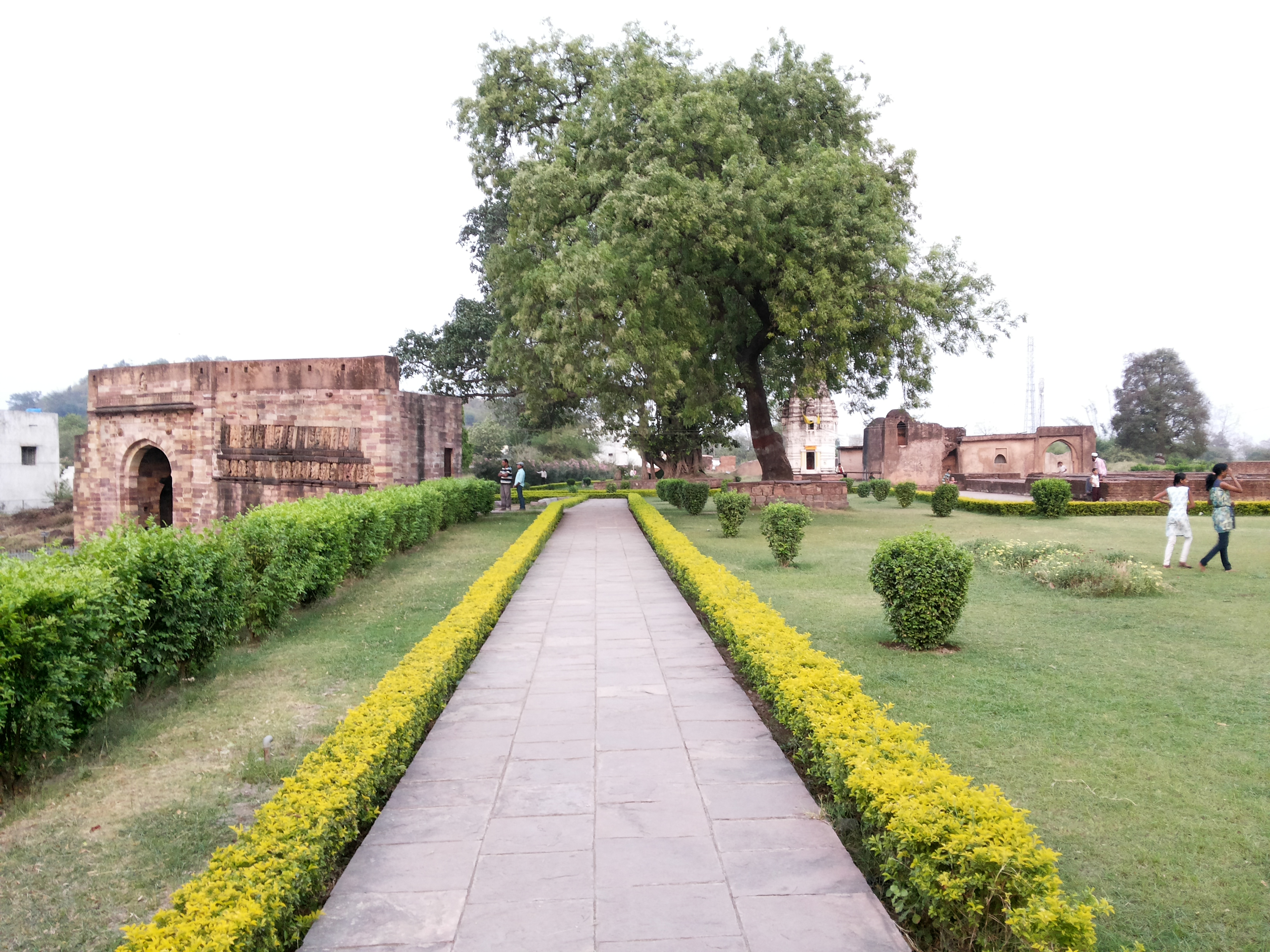
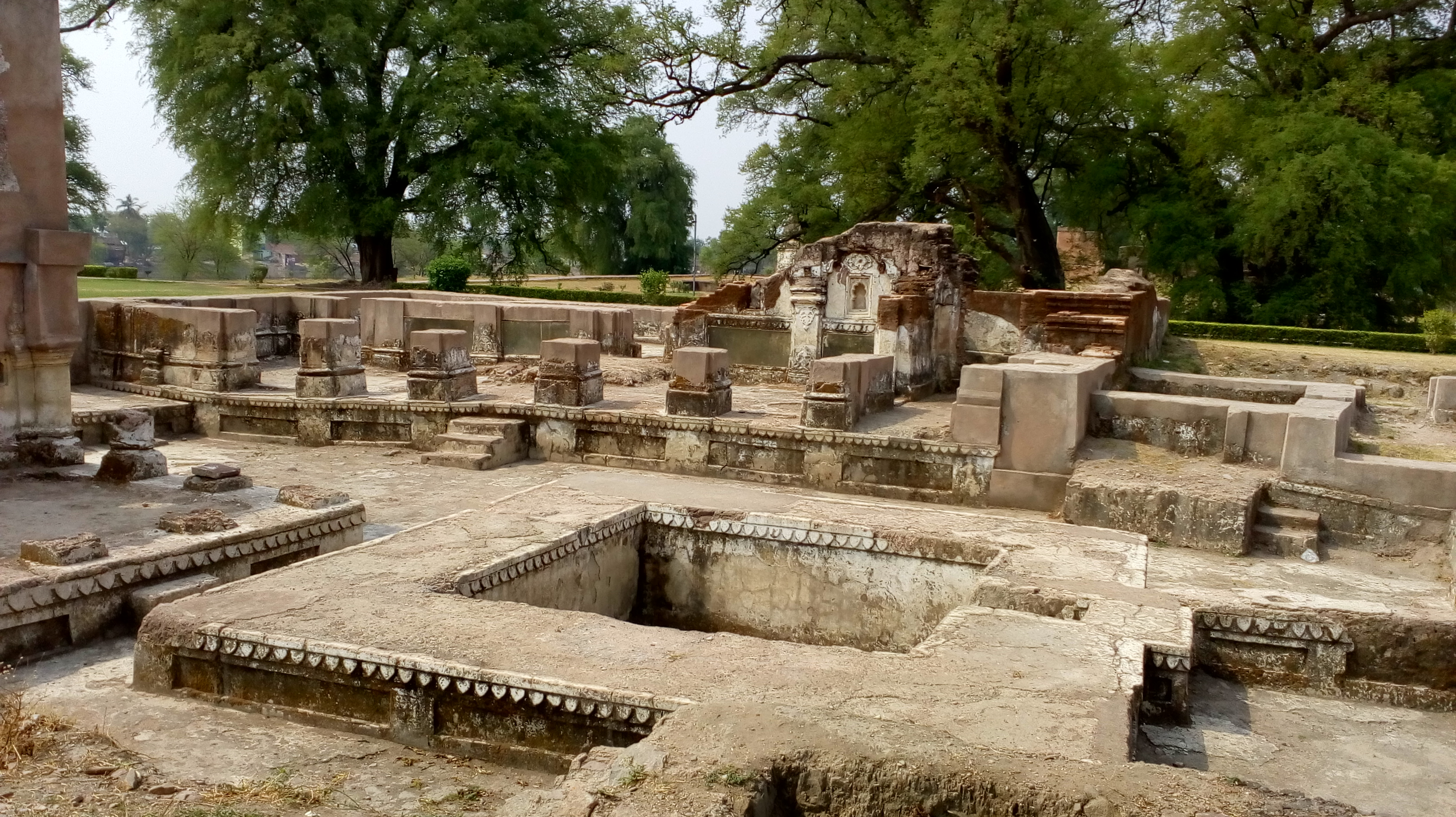
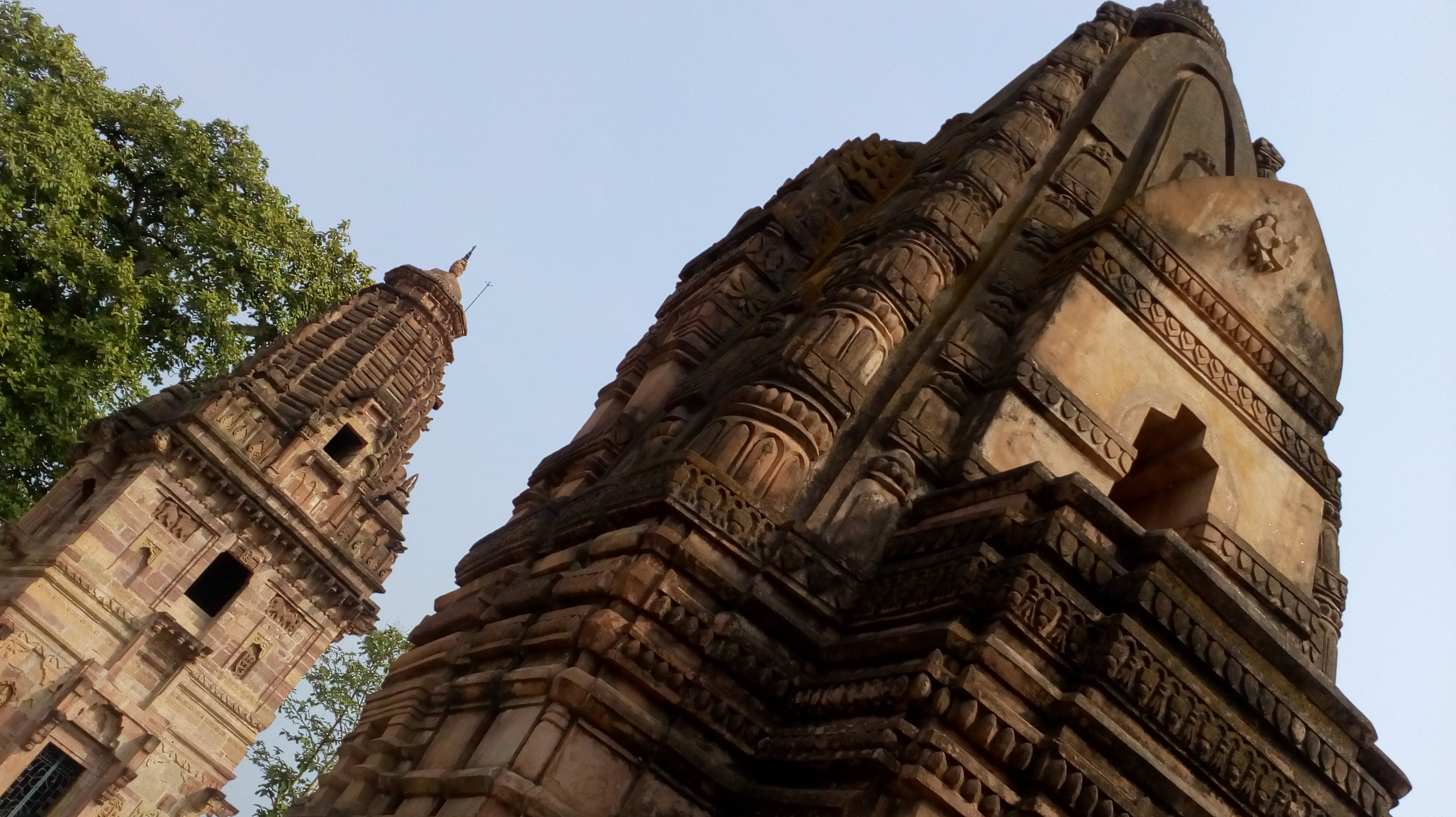
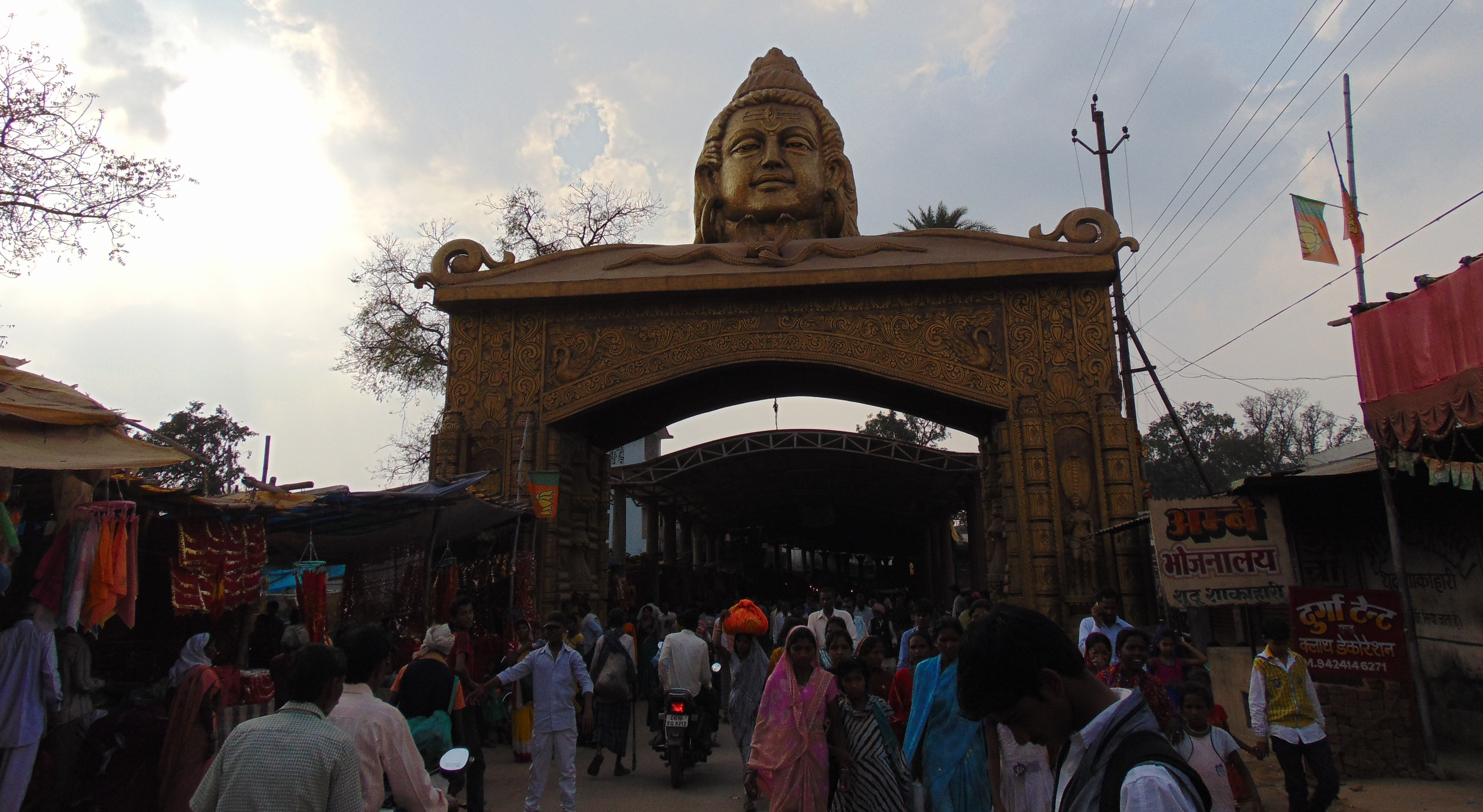
- From top to bottom: Ratanpur fort ( image 1 to 4); Mahamaya Temple Ratanpur
- Nickname: Ancient Capital of Chhattisgarh
- Location in Chhattisgarh, India Ratanpur (India)
- Coordinates: 22.288°N 82.166°E
- Country: India
- State: Chhattisgarh
- District: Bilaspur
- Elevation: 306 m (1,004 ft)

Population (2001)
  - Total: 19,838

Languages
  - Official: Chhattisgarhi, Hindi
- Time zone: UTC+5:30 (IST)
- Vehicle registration: CG

Ratanpur is a town and a nagar palika in Bilaspur district in the Indian state of Chhattisgarh. It is located about 25 kilometres (16 mi) from Bilaspur on National Highway 130 towards Ambikapur.

== History ==
Ratanpur, originally known as Ratnapura, was the capital of the Kalachuris of Ratnapura, a branch of the Kalachuris of Tripuri. According to the 1114 CE Ratanpur inscription of the local king Jajjaladeva I, his ancestor Kalingaraja conquered the Dakshina Kosala region and made Tummana (modern Tuman) his capital. Kalingaraja's grandson Ratnaraja later established Ratnapura (modern Ratanpur).

In 1407, the Kingdom of Ratanpur was divided into two parts, with its junior branch ruling from Raipur. It continued as the capital of the Kingdom until the 18th century, when it ruled large parts of present-day Chhattisgarh, until the area was brought under the rule of the Marathas led by the Bhonsle Maharaja of Nagpur. Senasahibsubha Raghuji Bhonsle's son Bimbaji ruled over Chhattisgarh from his capital in Ratanpur. Later, the region came under British rule.

During British rule, Ratanpur was administered from Bilaspur, which formed part of the Central Provinces of British India. The Central Provinces covered part of Chhattisgarh and Maharashtra states and its capital was Nagpur. in 1903, they were reorganised as the Central Provinces and Berar.

After the independence of India, Ratanpur became part of Madhya Pradesh with Bhopal as its capital. On formation of Chhattisgarh state the capital city of Chhattisgarh shifted to Raipur.

== Demographics ==
As of the 2001 India census, Ratanpur had a population of 19,838. Males constituted 51% of the population and females 49%. Ratanpur has an average literacy rate of 59%, lower than the national average of 59.5% while male literacy is 70% and female literacy is 47%. In Ratanpur, 17% of the population is under 6 years of age.

== Culture and religion ==
The town is popular as a religious center and many Hindu devotees come here to offer their prayers and seek the blessings at the Mahamaya Temple, goddess Mahamaya also known as Kosaleswari, as she was presiding deity of Dakshin Kosal (modern Chhattisgarh).

Many other temples such as Bhudha Mahadev and Ramtekri are also situated there.

== Transport ==
At around 25 kilometres (16 mi) from Bilaspur, the second largest city in Chhattisgarh state after Raipur, the journey to Bilaspur from the town can be made by plane, train or bus.

=== Air ===
Air travel is also accessible from Bilaspur. The Bilaspur Airport was inaugurated in March 2021 . There are direct flights from Bilaspur to Jabalpur, Delhi and Prayagraj.
