= Afghan insurrections in Bengal Subah =

Rebellions in Bengal Subah (1745–1748)

Afghan Insurrections in Bengal
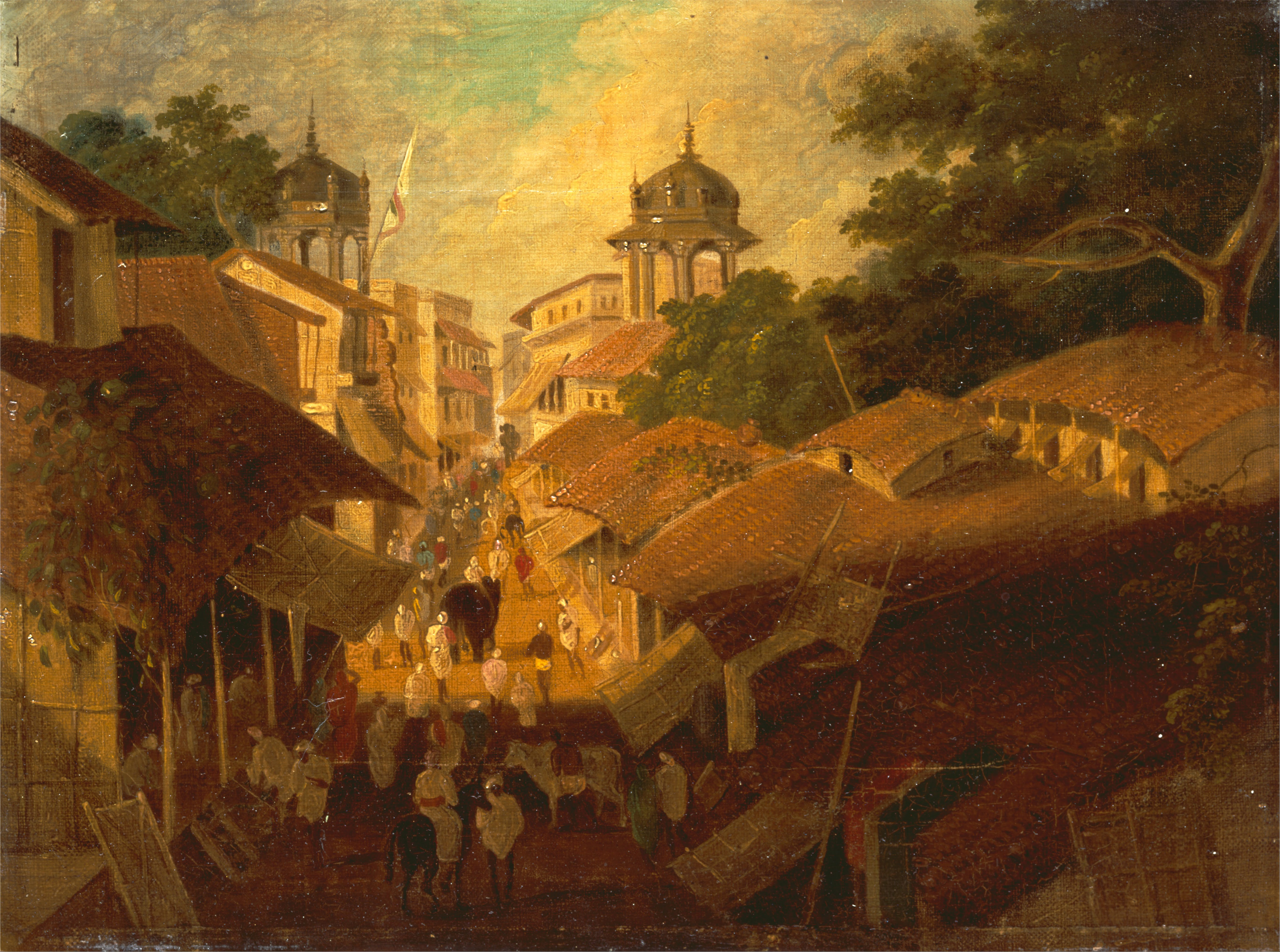
- The city of Azimabad (Patna), an important stronghold for Afghans in the Bengal Subah
| Date | 1745–1748 |
| Location | Bihar, Bengal Subah |
| Result | Bengal Subah victory |
| Territorial changes | Status quo ante bellum |

Belligerents
| Nawabs of Bengal | Afghans rebels Supported by: Maratha Empire; Kingdom of Nagpur |

Commanders and leaders
| Alivardi Khan Commanders: Zain ud-Din Ahmed Khan X; Hassan Beg Khan (POW); Abdul Ali Khan; Ahmad Khan Qureshi; Rajah Ram Narain; Khadem Husain Khan; Nasir Ali Khan; Zulfiqar Khan Mewati; Raja Kirat Singh; Muhammad Jahan Yar Khan; Shah Din Muhammad; Raham Khan Ruleha; Raja Kirat Chand; Daud Khan †; Khadem Husain Khan (WIA); Mahdi Nisar Khan; Naqi Ali Khan; Shah Jahan Yar; Raja Sundar Singh; Karam Khan; Hashim Ali Khan | Mustafa Khan †; Abdul Rasul Khan †; Sardar Khan †; Shamshir Khan †; Murad Sher Khan †; Buland Khan Ruhela; Udal Shah †; Hakim Shah †; Murtaza Khan |

Strength
| 1745: Patna: 14,000; Jagdishpur: 13,000–14,000 1748: Patna: Few soldiers Rani Sarai: 15,000–16,000 cavalry; 8,000 musketeers; 20,000 infantry | 1745: Patna: 20,000; Jagdishpur: 18,000 cavalry; 15,000 infantry 1748: Patna: 10,000 cavalry and infantry Rani Sarai: Afghan: 35,000–40,000 cavalry and approx. similar number of infantry Maratha: 12,000 cavalry |

The Afghan insurrections in Bengal, were a series of revolts led by the Afghans living in the Bengal Subah between 1745 and 1748. They were led by ambitious individuals like Mustafa Khan, Sardar Khan and Shamshir Khan with the intent to carve out their own Afghan state in Bengal. The insurrections were ultimately suppressed.

== Background ==
During the 17th and early 18th centuries, waves of Afghan immigration into Northern India replaced the earlier Afghan settlers, also known as Indo-Afghans, in Allahabad, Darbhanga, Orissa, and Sylhet. In several locations, these Afghan explorers were hired by the military as mercenaries or retainers. They established principalities and zones of influence in a few locations, including Tirhut (Darbhanga and Hajipur), Rohilkhand, Farrukhabad, and others. They possessed exceptional fighting skills and a talent for military planning. Alivardi Khan, the Nawab of Bengal, gained great help from the Afghans of Tirhut and Bihar throughout his time as the Naib nazim of Bihar (1733-1740 CE) and the first four years of his rule as the Nawab of Bengal (1740–44 CE). When Alivardi took over as Naib nazim, the entire province of Bihar was in disarray.

The majority of the Zamindars had turned unruly and rebellious, and the area had become the target of the evil deeds of a group of nomadic individuals known as the Banjaras, who used to pillage the Imperial estates and valuables while posing as travelers and traders. Alivardi bolstered his army and restored order in an effort to stop the Banjara threat. Abdul Karim Khan, a strong Afghan leader who commanded 1,500 Darbhanga Afghans, was accepted into his service. And it was because of these courageous Afghans that Alivardi overcame the turbulent Banjaras and took an enormous sum of booty from them. After the Banjaras, the province's refractory zamindars, including the Rajas of Bettia, Bhanwarah (or Bhawrah, a Mahal under Sarkar Tirhut), Bhojpur, Raja Sunder Singh of Tekari, and Kamgar Khan Main of Narhat Samai, were subdued by Alivardi with the help of Abdul Karim Khan. Alivardi Khan then turned towards the Chakwars, a powerful tribe with their stronghold situated in Begusarai, Bihar. The tribe was quickly subdued and made to pay an annual tribute to the Nawab of Bengal. It was during the subduing of the Tekari Raj where Mustafa Khan, a general of the Tekari Raj would be taken into the service of Alivardi Khan. According to the Muzaffarnama, with each passing day Mustafa Khan received such promotion that he reached the highest rank and became the master of 4000 troops with the title of Babar Jang.

== First Afghan Insurrection (1745) ==
=== Prelude ===
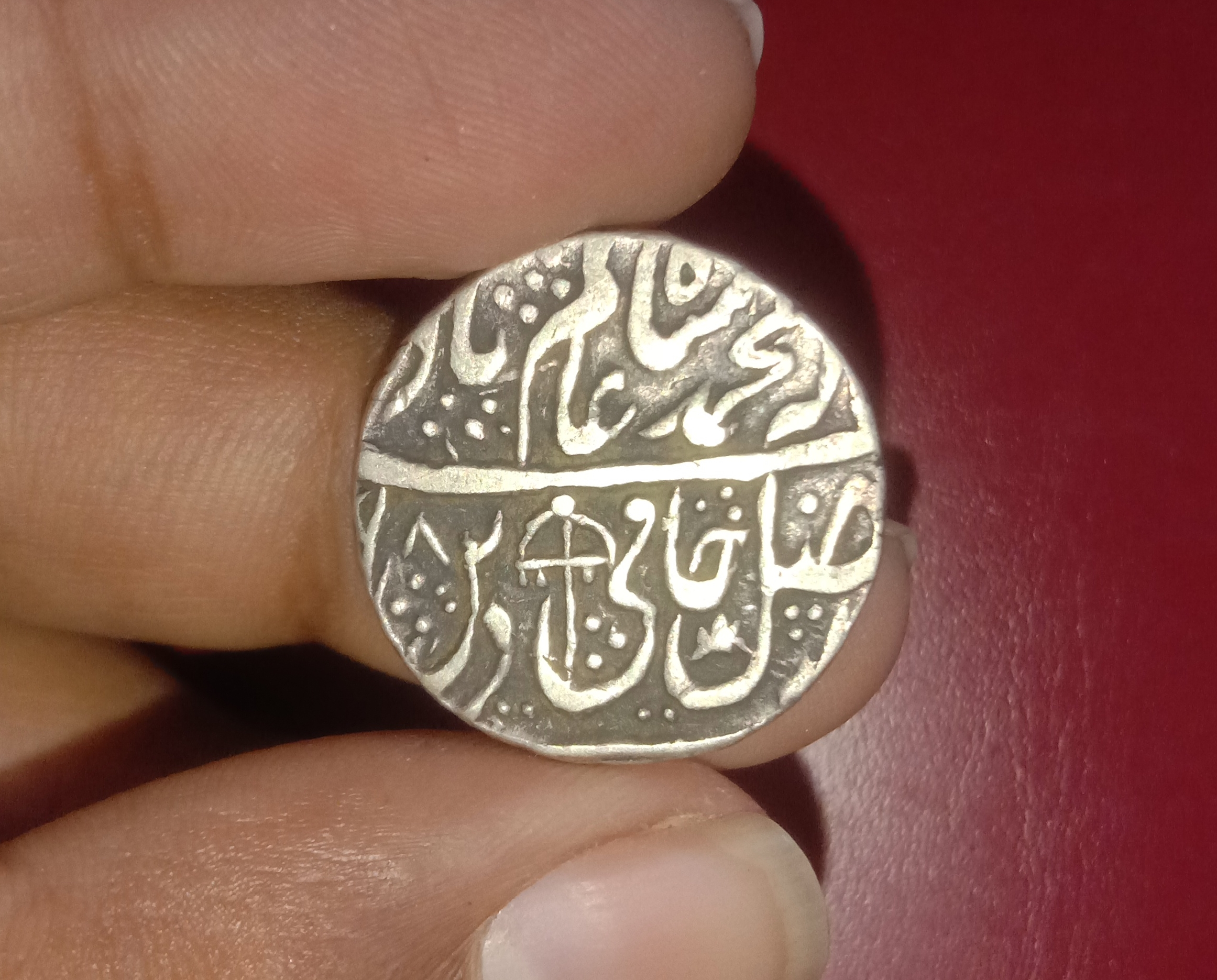
Silver rupee of the Kingdom of Rohilkhand, a Kingdom established by Afghan migrants into North India.

Mustafa Khan, also known as Babar Jang, had an object of envy due to his elevated position, authority and having the greatest rank at the time, according to historian, Upendra Thakur. Dissatisfied with his rise to power, Shamshir Khan and Sardar Khan surreptitiously tricked him. They pushed him to remove Haibat Jang (Zainuddin Ahmad Khan) from Azimabad (Patna) in order to obtain the deputy governorship of Bihar. In order to "unify all the Afghan Sardars together and remove Alivardi from the governorship," he drafted a manifest (Mahazar) and started persuading the Afghan generals to sign it. When Shamshir Khan and Sardar Khan brought him the manifest so he could seal it and share the administration Umar Khan, out of a sense of duty, tore up the paper and began insulting the Afghans. In order to prevent Alivardi's wrath Shamshir Khan and Sardar Khan returned to their homes in quiet. Their true goal, to discredit Mustafa Khan, was not accomplished.

This shift in Mustafa Khan's perspective was also somewhat Alivardi's responsibility. He had offered him the position of deputy governor of Bihar in exchange for killing Bhaskar Pandit, the Maratha general, during a time of extreme need. After the assignment was finished, Mustafa Khan demanded that the commitment be kept. However, Alivardi avoided its fulfillment, and wished to silence him by filling him with distinctions, softening him with kind words, and ease his resentment with a respectful attitude.

=== Invasion of Patna ===
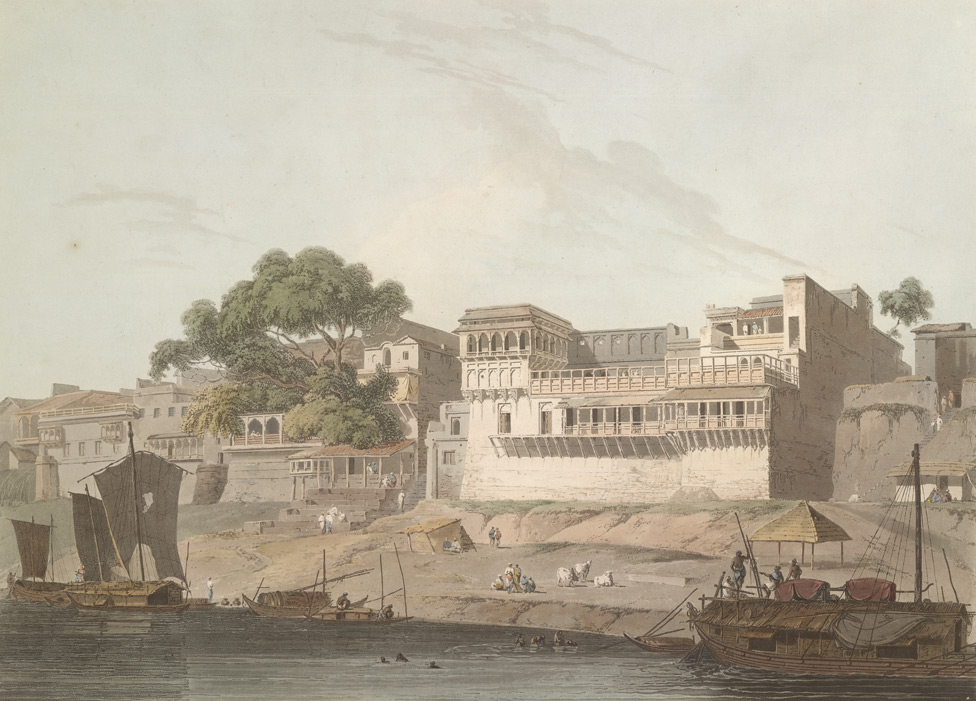
The city of Patna, (Azimabad).

Upon mustering a force of 9,000 Afghan horsemen and a powerful batch of infantry, Mustafa Khan pressed his demands for deputy governship of Bihar and for his payment for killing Bhaskar Pandit. Alivardi Khan immediately paid the arrear of his soldiers which amounted to 17 lakhs of rupees through the Jagat Seth family. Mustafa Khan now unlikely of receiving help from other Afghans in the region, discarded his original plan in Murshidabad and headed for Patna to take it by force from Zain ud-Din Ahmed Khan. He headed to Patna in February 1745 with 15,000 cavalry and Alivardi Khan in hot pursuit. Zain ud-Din Ahmed Khan the governor of Patna received word of Mustafa Khan's plans and immediately assembled his army and called out upon brave men to come to his side and join to fight. With the help of local nobles, zamindars and commanders he was prepared to face Mustafa's army.

Zain ud-Din Ahmed Khan had a force of 14,000 troopers while Mustafa Khan lead an army of 20,000.

==== Siege of Mongyhr ====
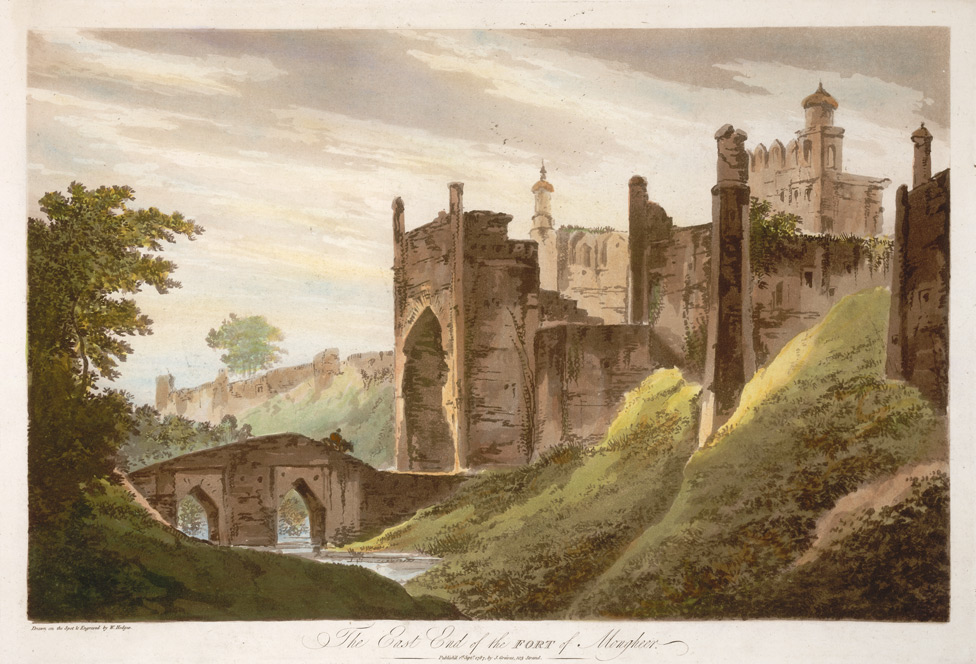
The Munger Fort which was seized by Mustafa Khan on his way to Patna.

Mustafa Khan ravaged, pillaged, and destroyed cities, villages, and other locations along the way. He also forcibly grabbed some weaponry and continued to march. He intended to capture it when he got to Monghyr. The Qiladar, or officer-in-charge, Hassan Beg Khan, presented resistance. Despite fierce bombardment from the fort, Mustafa's soldiers advanced to the wall, entered, and seized it. The Qiladar was imprisoned together with his three sons. Mustafa's own brother, Abdul Rasul Khan, was killed by a stone thrown from the fort when he was sitting on his elephant at the base of the fort during the attack.

==== Battle of Patna (1745) ====
After the siege of Mongyhr Mustafa Khan made his way towards Patna (Azimabad) where his army and Zain ud-Din Ahmed Khan's army ensued into battle. Beginning on 14 March 1745, the conflicts lasted a week. While Mustafa Khan had initial success the tide turned to favor Zain ud-Din Ahmed Khan, resulting in Mustafa being badly defeated.

=== Battle of Jagdishpur ===
Being defeated by Zain ud-Din Ahmed Khan, Mustafa Khan fled after being expelled. Four months later, Mustafa Khan assembled an army of 18,000 cavalry and 15,000 infantry, allied with Shahabad zamindars, and marched once more in the direction of Bihar with his son Murtaza Khan and additional individuals. Zain-ud-Din had himself with 13,000–14,000 soldiers. He defeated the Afghans at Jagdishpur on 20 June 1745, killing Mustafa Khan; his son Murtaza fled to Magror. As punishment for their intrigue with Maratha chief Raghuji Bhonsle during his September 1745 Bihar invasion, Alivardi dismissed all Afghans from service in June 1746. Thereafter they returned to their homes in Darbhanga.

== Second Afghan insurrection (1748) ==
Alivardi had dismissed rest of his Afghan generals as a punishment for their conspiracy with Raghuji during his invasion of Bihar in September 1745. Alivardi's nephew, Zain-ud-din Ahmad Khan, ambitious to seize power in Bengal, secretly sought the support of Afghan generals in Darbhanga, including Shamshir Khan, Murad Sher Khan, Sardar Khan, and Bakshi Bahelia. On 13 January 1748, during a ceremonial meeting in Patna, Zain-ud-din appeared without guards to gain their trust. The Afghans betrayed and murdered him. They captured Patna and tortured Zain-ud-din's father Haji Ahmad, and humiliated his family members. The Afghans, bolstered by fresh recruits and Maratha allies under Mir Habib and Janoji, occupied Patna for three months. Alivardi, recognizing the urgency, secured his army's loyalty and defenses at Murshidabad before marching from Amaniganj to Patna on 29 February 1748. On 16 April 1748, Alivardi decisively defeated the Afghans at Rani Sarai, eight miles west of Barh. The deaths of their key leaders Sardar Khan, Murad Sher Khan, and Shamshir Khan caused the Afghans to flee in disarray, followed by the Marathas, ending the occupation.

== List of conflicts ==
| Name of Conflict | Part of | Location | Date | Belligerents | | Result |
| Name of Conflict | Part of | Location | Date | Bengal Subah | Afghans and Maratha forces | Result |
|---|---|---|---|---|---|---|
| Siege of Monghyr | First Afghan Insurrection | Munger Fort, Bihar | February 1745 | Nawabs of Bengal: Hassan Beg Khan | Afghan rebels: Mustafa Khan; Abdul Rasul Khan † | Afghan victory: Munger Fort was seized by the Afghan rebels. |
| Battle of Patna (1745) | First Afghan Insurrection | Patna, Bihar | 14–21 March 1745 | Nawabs of Bengal: Zain ud-Din Ahmed Khan | Afghans rebels: Mustafa Khan (WIA) | Bengal Subah victory: Defeat and retreat of Mustafa Khan |
| Battle of Jagdishpur (1745) | First Afghan Insurrection | Jagdishpur, Bihar | 20 June 1745 | Nawabs of Bengal | Afghans rebels: Mustafa Khan † | Bengal Subah victory: Mustafa is killed in action and his army retreats, thus marking the end of the First Afghan insurrection. |
| Afghan occupation of Patna (1748) | Second Afghan Insurrection & Fifth Maratha invasion of Bengal | Patna, Bihar | 13 January 1748 | Nawabs of Bengal: Zain ud-Din Ahmed Khan X | Afghans rebels: Shamshir Khan; Sardar Khan; Murad Sher Khan | Afghan victory: Afghans occupy Bihar, and its capital Patna. |
| Battle of Rani Sarai | Second Afghan Insurrection & Fifth Maratha invasion of Bengal | Kaladiara, Bihar | 16 April 1748 | Nawabs of Bengal: Alivardi Khan | Afghans rebels: Shamshir Khan †; Murad Sher Khan †; Sardar Khan †; Maratha Empire: Kingdom of Nagpur; Janoji; Mir Habib | Bengal Subah victory |

== See also ==
- Nawabs of Bengal
- Maratha invasions of Bengal
- First Maratha invasion of Bengal
- Second Maratha invasion of Bengal
- Third Maratha invasion of Bengal
- Fourth Maratha invasion of Bengal
- Fifth Maratha invasion of Bengal
