= Fifth Maratha invasion of Bengal =

Maratha invasion of Bengal Subah (1748–1751)

- Part of Maratha invasions of Bengal
Date	1748–1751
Location	Bengal Subah (in parts of West Bengal, Bihar and modern Orissa)
Result	Inconclusive. See Aftermath
Territorial changes	Midnapore restored to the Bengal Subah; Territories south of Subarnarekha river ceded into the Kingdom of Nagpur

Belligerents
Bengal Subah	Maratha Empire; Nagpur; Afghan rebels

Commanders and leaders
Alivardi Khan; Haider Ali Khan; Dost Muhammad Khan; Mir Kazim Khan; Abdus Subhan Khan (POW); Ali Quli Khan; Mir Jafar; Siraj-ud-Daulah (AWOL); Durlabh Ram	Janoji; Mir Habib; Sabaji Bhonsle; Sayyid Nur (POW); Dharmadas Hazari (POW); Sarandaz Khan †; Mohan Singh

Strength
Burdwan: 8,000 (Note: Under Haider Ali Khan); Midnapore: 5,000–6,000 cavalry (Note: Under Alivardi Khan)	Bihar: 5,000 cavalry; 7,000 infantry Cuttack: 7,000–8,000; Balasore: 40,000 (Note: Allied with Afghan rebels); Midnapore: 12,000 cavalry

Casualties and losses
Unknown	Unknown

The Fifth Maratha invasion of Bengal from 1748 to June 1751, was the final phase of the decade-long Maratha invasions of Bengal (1742–1751). Maratha forces led by Mir Habib and Janoji Bhonsle once again penetrated deep into Bengal and renewing widespread plunder across the western and southern districts. Despite Alivardi Khan's personal intervention and a decisive victory and recovery of Odisha in 1749, the Nawab’s army remained exhausted, his treasury depleted, and the province economically shattered. Simultaneously, Raghoji Bhonsle faced mounting debts and mutinous troops due to irregular pay. Mutual exhaustion forced both sides to the negotiating table. The campaign ended with treaty between the two parties, under which Bengal agreed to pay an annual chauth of 12 lakh rupees, ceded effective fiscal control of Orissa to the Marathas, and secured a permanent border along the Subarnarekha River. The treaty terminated the decade of devastating Bargi raids and marked the effective end of large-scale Maratha incursions into Bengal during Alivardi Khan's reign.

== Background ==
In January 1748, the dismissed Afghan generals seized Patna and killed its governor Zain ud-Din Ahmed Khan. Alivardi led expedition against the Afghan rebels in Bihar. Taking the opportunity a body of Maratha troops under Janoji left Midnapore and invaded Burdwan. To press Alivardi Khan, the Marathas allied with Afghan rebels, temporarily halted plundering in western Bengal, and redirected their forces toward Bihar to chase the Bengal army. Mir Habib led the advance troops of 5,000 cavalry and 7,000 infantry through the Santal Paraganas and entered Bihar. Janoji and Mir Habib joined the Afghans in Patna. Alivardi Khan defeated the allied Maratha and Afghan army at the Battle of Rani Sarai on 16 April 1748. After staying at Patna for six months, on 6 November he began his return to Murshidabad and reached on 30 November 1748.

== Siege of Odisha ==
In March 1749, Alivardi Khan began his campaign to reconquer Odisha from Marathas. Mir Habib who was stationed at Midnapore was reinforced by Raghuji's younger son Sabaji Bhonsle. Mir Habib sent detachments to plunder different parts of Odisha. Few months prior Alivardi Khan dispatched Haider Ali Khan with 8,000 soldiers detachment to Burdwan to block the Marathas. Alivardi reached Midnapore and ordered Haider Ali Khan to join him. The troops mutinied, refusing to march until their pay arrears were cleared. Negotiations failed, and an enraged Alivardi disbanded the entire unit. He pressed on to Midnapore with a much weaker force of only 5,000–6,000 cavalry and no artillery. Mir Habib upon hearing Alivardi's march fled to the South. Alivardi crossed Midnapore where the Bengal army under Dost Muhammad Khan, Mir Kazim Khan and others defeated the Marathas. Alivardi Khan pursued the Marathas to Balasore. Janoji and Mir Habib escaped to the jungle of Cuttack. Marching from Bara, Alivardi marched with an army of 2,000 soldiers which was reduced to 300 and arrived to Cuttack on 17 May. On 18 May, Sayyid Nur, Dharmadas Hazari and Sarandaz Khan who were incharge of the Barabati fort visited the Nawab in his camp. Sayyid Nur and Dharmadas Hazari were imprisoned while Sarandaz Khan who resisted was slain. The garrison defended the fort for 15 days before surrendering it to Alivardi. Thus Alivardi successfully recovered Odisha from Marathas. Alivardi appointed Shah Abdus Subhan Khan as the deputy governor of Odisha. Within a week of Alivardi's departure from Odisha, 7,000–8,000 Marathas hiding in the neighbouring Jungle attacked and wounded Abdus Subhan Khan despite his valiant resistance. Abdus Subhan Khan was imprisoned. Alivardi's fatigued army was in terrible condition to recover Odisha. Due to severe illness Alivardi returned to Murshidabad in early July 1749.

== Later conflicts ==
Mir Habib and Mohan Singh went to Balasore on 15 October. Joined by the Afghans the army peaked at 40,000 in strength. In December detachments of Marathas created havoc near Kolkata. Alivardi assembled an army at Katwa and proceeded to Burdwan then Midnapore. He camped near Midnapore and appointed Ali Quli Khan as the Faujdar of Midnapore.

In early March 1750, while Nawab Alivardi Khan was encamped at Midnapore, 12,000 Maratha horsemen under Mir Habib, bypassed him, ravaged the country up to Rajmahal, and advanced near Murshidabad. There they skirmished with Mir Jafar's troops, forced them to retreat closer to the city, and began systematic plundering and burning in the surrounding areas. Alivardi hurried back from Midnapore to Burdwan. The Marathas immediately withdrew into the western jungles. Alivardi returned to Burdwan and stayed for a time. Soon he learned that the Marathas had reappeared at Midnapore. Alivardi marched back there, only to find they had vanished again.

In June 1750, Siraj-ud-Daulah revolted against Alivardi. He made an excuse and left from the camp at Midnapore and laid an unsuccessful assault on Patna. Alivardi hearing Siraj-ud-Daulah's act marched towards Patna. At Ghiyaspur he learnt Siraj-ud-Daulah's defeat and restored him to all his favour. Whilst staying at Patna, Alivardi became ill due to severe fever. He was taken by boat to Murshidabad under medical care and recovered by September 1750. However, rumours of his illness and old age had demoralised the troops at Midnapore, while the incompetence and timidity of his senior officers Durlabh Ram and Mir Jafar Khan encouraged the Marathas to renew their attacks on the region. Still in frail health, Alivardi personally marched to Midnapore in December 1750, defeated Mir Habib's forces, and forced the Maratha commander to flee into the nearby jungles. Pursued further by the Nawab's army, Mir Habib retreated toward Odisha. Having secured Midnapore for the moment, Alivardi returned to Katwa and postponed a full campaign to drive the Marathas out of Bengal until the following year.

== Treaty ==
By 1751, both sides were exhausted and bankrupt after nearly a decade of Maratha invasions of Bengal. The Marathas gained little profit; the conquest of poor Odisha did not cover costs, Raghuji was deep in debt, and his unpaid troops were mutinying after Sabaji's retreat. Alivardi Khan then aged 75 was worn out; his army was shattered, western and southern Bengal devastated and depopulated by annual raids, and the treasury empty. Both desperately needed peace and recovery. In March 1751, Alivardi allowed Mir Jafar to open negotiations through Mir Habib. Envoys met, terms were drafted at Murshidabad, sent to Nagpur for approval, and a peace treaty was finally signed in May–June 1751, with the following conditions:

1. Mir Habib as the deputy governor of Orissa under Alivardi Khan, therefore required to serve Alivardi loyally and remit the province's surplus revenue to Raghuji's army as their pay.
2. Payment to Raghuji an annual chauth of 12 lakh rupees.
3. The Marathas undertook never to invade, with the Bengal-Orissa frontier fixed at the river Subarnarekha; the Marathas pledged never to cross this border again.

Following the treaty Midnapore district was restored to Bengal Subah.

== See also ==
- First Maratha invasion of Bengal
- Second Maratha invasion of Bengal
- Third Maratha invasion of Bengal
- Afghan insurrections in Bengal Subah

== Bibliography ==
- Datta, Kalikinkar (1939). Alivardi and His Times. University of Calcutta.
- Sarkar, Jadunath (1964). Fall Of The Mughal Empire 1739-1754. Vol. I (3rd ed.). Orient Longman Ltd.
- Sarkar, Jadunath (1943). The History of Bengal. Vol. II. Ramna, Dhaka: The University of Dhaka.
- Datta, K. K. (1978). "Bengal Subah (1707-1756)". In Banerjee, A.C.; Ghase, D. K. (eds.). A Comprehensive History of India: 1712-1772, edited by A. C. Banerjee and D. K. Ghase. People's Publishing House.
- Malik, Zahiruddin (1977). The Reign of Muhammad Shah, 1719-1748. Asia Publishing House. ISBN 978-0-210-40598-7.
