= Battle of Rani Sarai =

1748 battle between allied Maratha Empire and Afghan rebels with Bengal Subah

- Part of Fifth Maratha invasion of Bengal and Afghan insurrections in Bengal Subah
Date	16 April 1748
Location	Rani Sarai, near Barh, Bihar 25°26′59.8992″N 85°33′14.7024″E
Result	Bengal Subah victory
Territorial changes	Patna re-annexed to Bengal Subah

Belligerents
Bengal Subah	Maratha Empire; Kingdom of Nagpur; Afghan rebels

Commanders and leaders
Alivardi Khan Commanders: Siraj-ud-Daulah; Shaikh Din Muhammad; Raja Sundar Singh; Kamgar Khan Mayi; Bahadur Ali Khan; Haider Ali Khan; Rahmat Khan; Mir Kazim Khan; Dost Muhammad Khan; Sayyid Ahmad Khan; Allah Yar Khan; Mirza Iraj Khan; Umar Khan; Asalat Khan; Diler Khan; Ahmad Khan; Muhammad Khan; Shah Jahan Yar; Fakhrullah Beg Khan	Janoji; Mir Habib; Shamshir Khan †; Murad Sher Khan †; Sardar Khan †; Mirza Mahmed Saleh; Mohan Singh; Hayat Khan

Strength
15,000–16,000 cavalry 8,000 musketeers 20,000 infantry (Note: Kalikinkar Datta and Upendra Thakur write Alivardi also had 20,000 infantry in addition to 15,000–16,000 cavalry.); Total: 23,000–44,000	Afghan: 35,000–40,000 cavalry and approx. similar number of infantry Maratha: 12,000 cavalry Total: 47,000–52,000

Casualties and losses
Unknown	Unknown
- Location within Bihar Battle of Rani Sarai (India)

The Battle of Rani Sarai also known as the Battle of Kaladiara, fought on 16 April 1748 near Rani Sarai, eight miles west of Barh in Bihar, was a decisive engagement in the Afghan insurrections in Bengal Subah. Nawab Alivardi Khan's Bengal army defeated a rebel alliance of Afghans under Shamshir Khan and Murad Sher Khan, supported by Maratha forces led by Mir Habib and Janoji. The conflict was sparked by the Afghan seizure of Patna and the killing of Alivardi's nephew Zain ud-Din Ahmad Khan, the Naib-Nazim of Bihar. The deaths of Shamshir Khan, Sardar Khan and Murad Sher Khan in the battle precipitated a rebel rout, allowing Alivardi to reclaim Bihar and suppress the revolt, though Maratha incursions continued.

The conflict was triggered when dismissed Afghan generals treacherously assassinated Zain ud-Din Ahmad Khan and seized control of Patna. In response, Nawab Alivardi Khan marched north to avenge his kinsmen and reclaim the province. At Rani Sarai, Alivardi's force of approximately 23,000 to 44,000 troops confronted a significantly larger rebel alliance of roughly 35,000 to 40,000 Afghans led by Shamshir Khan and Murad Sher Khan, who were reinforced by 12,000 Maratha cavalry under Janoji and Mir Habib. Despite facing a numerically superior adversary, the Bengal vanguard utilized disciplined artillery units and aggressive elephant charges to break the enemy lines. The battlefield deaths of the primary Afghan commanders Sardar Khan, Murad Sher Khan, and Shamshir Khan lead a total collapse and rout of the rebel forces. Their Maratha allies withdrew with minimal engagement. Alivardi Khan's decisive victory was followed by successful recapture of Patna. He freed his surviving captive family members, and re-establish administrative control over Bihar. This marked the end of Afghan incursions in Bengal. However, the Maratha raids still continued until 1751.

== Background ==
In January 1748, dismissed Afghan generals of Alivardi Khan such as Shamshir Khan, Sardar Khan, Murad Sher Khan and Bakshi Bahelia treacherously murdered Zain ud-Din Ahmad Khan, the governor of Bihar at Patna. They captured the city, tortured Zain ud-Din's father Haji Ahmad to death. Zain ud-Din's widow Amina Begum and daughter were taken captive by Afghans and treated disgracefully. Thus Bihar fell under the Afghan rule.

== Prelude ==
Following the seizure of Patna's government, Shamshir Khan encamped in Mir Jafar Khan's garden outside the city. He appointed Murad Sher Khan as its administrator. Predicting a counter-attack by Alivardi Khan, Shamshir Khan rapidly expanded his forces through intensive recruitment of Afghan soldiers. He summoned Afghan tribal kinsmen from various regions to rally under his banner. Within three months 40,000 cavalry and almost same number of infantry was recruited. The infantry also consisted musketeers under Bahelia command. They also had a strong artillery sieged from Patna. Additionally, the Marathas, requested by the Afghans, proceed to Patna and joined the Afghan forces in a planned assault on Alivardi Khan. The Maratha contingents, led by Mir Habib and Janoji, subsequently reinforced the Afghan army.

=== Alivardi's arrangements and advance ===
On 30 January, Alivardi was informed of the assassination of his nephew Zain ud-Din, death of his brother Haji Ahmad and the disgraceful treatment of his daughter Amina Begum. He resolved to recapture Patna, liberate his surviving relatives held captive by the Afghans, and avenge the deaths of his two close kinsmen. After arranging the necessary precautions, Alivardi left Amaniganj on 29 February and reached Bhagalpur on 16 March 1748 with 15,000 or 16,000 cavalry and 20,000 infantry. At Bhagalpur, Marathas under Mir Habib, pursued Alivardi from Bengal via a shorter jungle path. They emerged near Champanagar and attacked the Nawab's rear. In the ensuing engagement the Marathas were defeated and routed. They then advanced to Munger. Saif Khan of Purneah dispatched Shaikh Din Muhammad with 1,500 soldiers near Sultanganj. Marching from Sultanganj, Alivardi Khan halted at Monghyr for several days. There, he was reinforced by Raja Sundar Singh of Tikari, who arrived with 1,500 cavalry and a contingent of infantry, as well as by Kamgar Khan Mayi, the zamindar of Narhat and Samai. The Bengal army advanced from Munger and soon reached Barh.

== Battle ==
At Barh the Afghans received the information that Mir Habib and Janoji had reached Patna. Shamshir Khan and Sardar Khan received the Maratha army in their camp near Patna. The next day, Afghan forces detained Mir Habib, Mirza Mahmed Saleh, Mohan Singh, and other Maratha officers, demanding 30–40 lakhs of rupees as payment, claiming the Marathas had incited the rebellion and promised to cover costs. The officers were released after Mir Habib provided security for two lakhs. Shamshir Khan leaving Ahmad Khan Qureshi with 2,500 soldiers in charge of Patna, advanced towards Barh with Maratha army to counter Alivardi Khan who was coming towards Patna. The Afghan forces numbered approximately 35,000, while the Marathas were at 12,000. Alivardi Khan's army consisted of an estimated 15,000 cavalry and 8,000 foot musketeers.

They encamped with guns on the opposite side of the river. Alivardi Khan, guided by a local zamindar, crossed the narrow southern branch of the Ganges at an unknown ford south of Barh. Upon this maneuver, the Afghans abandoned their entrenched position with its heavy guns and fled westward to Alivardi's new position. Alivardi's forces had to crossed the river at night with great caution.

On the morning of 16 April 1748, Alivardi Khan advanced to the village of Rani Sarai (Note: Also known as Ranichak, approximately eight miles west of Barh.) and arrayed his forces on the adjacent plain. Bahadur Ali Khan commanded the vanguard with the Nawab's heavy artillery positioned at the front. Behind them were the lighter guns under Haider Ali Khan, Rahmat Khan, Mir Kazim Khan, and Dost Muhammad Khan. The cavalry and infantry of the advance guard followed, led by Sayyid Ahmad Khan, Allah Yar Khan, Mirza Iraj Khan, Raja Sundar Singh, and Kamgar Khan Mayi. Alivardi positioned himself at the center, flanked closely by Umar Khan and his four sons—Asalat Khan, Diler Khan, Ahmad Khan, and Muhammad Khan. The Afghan main force deployed opposite the Bengal army in a line extending nearly three miles eastward from Rani Sarai, with the allied Marathas positioned at an angle facing the Nawab's left wing. The Afghan left wing, under Hayat Khan and equipped with heavy guns, crossed a narrow stream to the Ganges to target the Bengal right wing upon its approach.

At the beginning of the clashes a cannon fire blew off Sardar Khan's head who was at the command of half of Afghan troops. Haider Ali Khan immediately led his musketeers in an assault, firing repeated volleys. As the Afghans fell into disarray, Alivardi Khan ordered Shah Jahan Yar and Fakhrullah Beg Khan to charge, but they remained still. Meanwhile, the Marathas under Mir Habib, seeking to divert attention in support of their allies, attacked Alivardi's baggage train in the rear and advanced toward the center. Siraj ud-Daula, positioned near his grandfather. He was alarmed and urged the Nawab to repel them at once. Disregarding this plea, Alivardi directed his vanguard to charge the Afghans head-on and advanced personally behind it. Several of his generals, mounted on elephants, plunged boldly into the enemy ranks. Struck by a musket ball, Murad Sher Khan collapsed into his elephant, whereupon two of the Nawab's generals, Mir Kazim Khan and Dost Muhammad Khan, attacked him. Despite his wounds, Murad Sher Khan severed several fingers of Mir Kazim Khan, but Dost Muhammad Khan promptly decapitated him. Simultaneously, Shamshir Khan was wounded and fell from his elephant; Mirza Habib Beg, a retainer of the Nawab's general Diler Khan immediately beheaded him. Devastated by the loss of their commanders, the Afghans fled the field, while their Maratha allies, who had played no significant role in the day's combat, likewise withdrew.

== Aftermath ==
After a brief pause en route, Alivardi Khan entered Patna amid widespread rejoicing from his surviving family and the city's inhabitants. By the first week of May 1748, the Afghan threat had been effectively neutralized. Nawab's agents confiscated Afghan property in Darbhanga. He liberated his imprisoned daughter Amina Begum, and reestablished his administration in Bihar. He left Patna on 6 November returned to Murshidabad on 30 November 1748, after formally appointed Siraj ud-Daulah as deputy governor of Bihar, with Raja Janaki Ram entrusted with day-to-day administration. For nearly a year from April 1748 to March 1749, Bengal and Bihar experienced a respite from Maratha raids, though the Marathas retained control over Orissa south of Midnapore.

== See also ==
- Battle of Patna (1745)
- Battle of Naubatpur (1745)
- Battle of Jagdishpur (1745)
- Battle of Bhagalpur (1745)

== Bibliography ==
- Datta, Kalikinkar (1939). Alivardi and His Times. University of Calcutta.
- Sarkar, Jadunath (1964). Fall Of The Mughal Empire 1739-1754. Vol. I (3rd ed.). Orient Longman Ltd.
- Sarkar, Jadunath (1943). The History of Bengal. Vol. II. Ramna, Dhaka: The University of Dhaka.
- Datta, K. K. (1978). "Bengal Subah (1707-1756)". In Banerjee, A.C.; Ghase, D. K. (eds.). A Comprehensive History of India: 1712-1772, edited by A. C. Banerjee and D. K. Ghase. People's Publishing House.
- Thakur, Upendra (1958). "Alivardi and the Afghans of Tirhut". Proceedings of the Indian History Congress. 21: 376–392. ISSN 2249-1937.
- Mishra, Shree Govind (1970). History of Bihar, 1740-1772. Munshiram Manoharlal. ISBN 978-81-215-0382-2.
- Roy, Kaushik (2009). The Oxford Companion to Modern Warfare in India: From the Eighteenth Century to Present Times. Oxford University Press. ISBN 978-0-19-569888-6.
