= Afghan occupation of Patna (1748) =

Part of Afghan insurrections in Bengal Subah

- Part of Afghan insurrections in Bengal Subah
- The city of Patna on the bank of the Ganges River
| Date | 13 January 1748 |
| Location | Patna, Bihar, Bengal Subah 25°35′39″N 85°08′15″E |
| Result | Afghan victory |
| Territorial changes | Patna seized by Afghan rebels |

Belligerents
| Bengal Subah | Afghan rebels |

Commanders and leaders
| Zain ud-Din Ahmed Khan X Haji Ahmad X | Shamshir Khan; Sardar Khan; Murad Sher Khan; Bakhshi Bahelia; Ahmad Panie; Thakur Bahelia; Abdur Rashid Khan |

Strength
| Few soldiers | Total: 10,000 cavalry and infantry: Shamshir Khan: 3,000–4,000; Murad Sher Khan: 5,000; Thakur Bahelia: 500 (Note: Kalikinkar Datta writes 500 soldiers were under Thakur Bahelia while Jadunath Sarkar writes they were under Murad Sher Khan) |

Casualties and losses
| Heavy | Negligible |
- Location within Bihar Patna, Bihar (India)

The Afghan occupation of Patna (1748) was a short-lived takeover of the city in January 1748 by dismissed Afghan soldiers led by Shamshir Khan and Sardar Khan. After Zain ud-Din Ahmad Khan, the Deputy Governor of Patna and nephew of Nawab Alivardi Khan, invited the Afghans to join his service, they assassinated him in the Chihil Sutun during a ceremonial audience on 13 January. Zain ud-Din’s father, Haji Ahmad, was captured, tortured for seventeen days to reveal hidden treasures, and died on 30 January. The Afghans plundered the palace, seized family members, and briefly held the city for three months before the revolt was suppressed by Alivardi Khan in the Battle of Rani Sarai.

== Background ==
In November 1745, during Alivardi's fight with Marathas in the battle of Naubatpur on the bank of Sone River, he received no support from his Afghan generals Shamshir Khan and Sardar Khan. They later joined in a conspiracy with Raghuji to overthrow Alivardi and divide the three Subahs of Bengal among them. Moreover, they had deputed to get rid of Zain ud–din Ahmad Khan, the governor of Bihar, for which they were promised two lakhs of rupees in addition to the Fauzdari of Darbhanga and the command of the 12,000 horse. Alivardi therefore dismissed both of them from service in June 1746. However the troops refused to leave until fully paid. They defied the Nawab, mistreated his messenger, and after skirmishes were forcibly ejected. They then encamped at Sakrigali with 6,000 men, demanding payment, before retiring to Darbhanga, Tirhut.

Meanwhile Zain-ud-Din, emboldened by his prior military successes including his assistance to Alivardi Khan against Bhaskar Ram Kolhatkar in the Battle of Katwa in 1742 and his victories over Mustafa Khan at battle of Patna in March and battle of Jagdishpur in June 1745, developed ambitions to usurp the throne of Bengal by deposing his uncle Alivardi. During a visit to Murshidabad for the wedding of Siraj ud-Daulah, Zain ud-Din observed the power and wealth of Alivardi's two brothers, further fueling his designs. Zain ud-Din planned to treat Alivardi in the same manner that Alivardi had earlier overthrown and killed his own master and the former Nawab, Sarfaraz Khan.

To achieve his goal, Zainuddin sought to recruit experienced Afghan generals from Darbhanga into his army. Zain ud-Din wrote to Alivardi Khan, stating that the dismissed Afghan soldiers idling in Darbhanga formed terrible menace to his administration. As expelling them from the province was impossible, Zain ud-Din proposed enlisting their officers along with 3,000 troops into his service, with maintenance costs drawn from the Murshidabad treasury. Both Alivardi and his brother Haji Ahmad opposed him to take such action but Zain ud-Din insisted. Alivardi reluctantly approved the request, motivated primarily by affection for his nephew Zain ud-Din.

== Prelude ==
After the return of his agent to Patna, Zain ud-Din sent his agents to the Afghans at Darbhanga, inviting them to come to Patna and to accept service in his army. On 10 December they left Darbhanga and by 16 December 1747, a large body of Afghans under Shamshir Khan, his sister's son Murad Sher Khan, Sardar Khan, and Bakhshi Bahelia reached Hajipur, opposite Patna on the northern side of the Ganges. The Afghan leaders, suspecting Zain ud-Din's invitation to be a ruse aimed at their suppression, refrained from crossing the Ganges en masse. Instead, they halted at Hajipur for fifteen days while conducting negotiations with him. Eager to secure their service, Zain ud-Din traveled to Hajipur in a fast-sailing boat, accompanied only by two or three personal attendants and his youngest son, Mirza Mahdi. Following an interview, the Afghan commanders crossed the river and established camp at Jafar Khan's garden in early January 1748. A horde of 10,000 cavalry and infantry crossed the river and escaped at Jafar Khan's garden.

== Fall of Patna ==
By mutual agreement, January 13, 1748, was set for a formal audience between the Afghan chiefs and their followers with Zain ud-Din in the Chihil Sutun (Hall of Audience) at Patna. To reassure the Afghans of his good faith, Zain ud-Din issued an order widely regarded as imprudent that no soldiers be present in the hall. The troops in the city were barred from the venue per Zain ud-Din's directive. Only a small number of courtiers and officials were permitted inside: Muhammad Askar Khan, Mir Murtaza, Muralidhar (head of intelligence), Ramzani (superintendent of arms), Sitaram (artillery accounts controller), Mir Abdullah (a prominent Patna citizen), religious figures such as Shah Bandagi, and a few visitors paying respects.

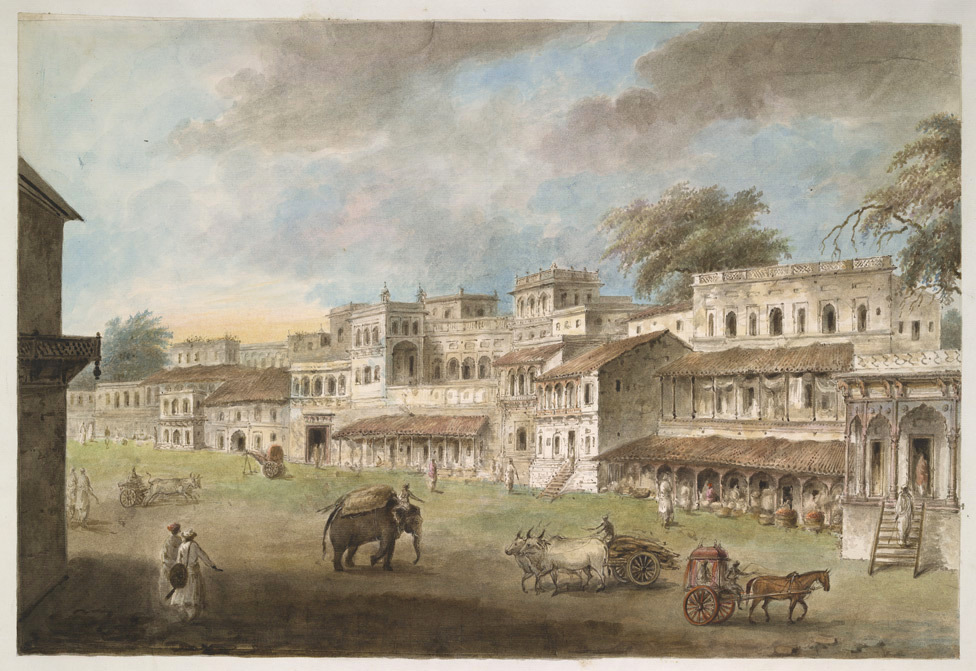
Main street of Patna, showing one side of the Chowk, c. 1814-15

On January 13, 1748, Afghan leaders Ahmad Panie, Murad Sher Khan, and Thakur Bahelia entered the Chihil Sutun with 500 troops for the scheduled audience with Zain ud-Din, the governor of Patna. Concurrently, Shamshir Khan positioned 3,000 to 4,000 Afghans at the city's center near the kotwal's platform, blocking the eastern gate and the primary route to the palace. Murad Sher Khan had 5,000 soldiers with him. Murad Sher Khan presented his soldiers one by one to Zain ud-Din. Upon learning of Shamshir Khan's advance, Murad Sher Khan directed his men to exit the hall to accommodate the incoming group. As the Afghans departed, Abdur Rashid Khan stabbed Zain ud-Din with a dagger; the blow proved ineffective due to the attacker's nervousness. Murad Sher Khan then struck a fatal sword blow, bisecting Zain ud-Din's body. The remains were dismembered and interred in a site in Patna's Begampur neighborhood. Chaos ensued following the assassination. Many of Zain ud-Din's officers and attendants were killed or injured in futile attempts at resistance; a few escaped after being disarmed. In accordance with a premeditated plan, Shamshir Khan and Sardar Khan proceeded to occupy Zain ud-Din's palace.

Haji Ahmad, Zain ud-Din's father and the elder brother of Alivardi Khan, initially escaped through a breach in the palace wall while the Afghans entered, hiding in a neighboring house. Despite having time to flee to Bengal and join Alivardi, Haji Ahmad, obsessed with wealth and women stayed there. He was captured by the Afghans that evening and brought before Shamshir Khan. The Afghans subjected Haji Ahmad to seventeen days of torture to reveal his hidden treasures. The Afghans were under the impression that Haji Ahmad was responsible for the murder of their leader Mustafa Khan, so Shamshir Khan gave a hundred and one lashes. He was placed on an ass, his face painted half black and half white and was paraded round the city. Then he was chained to the leg of an elephant, and met a cruel and lingering death. Haji Ahmad succumbed to the effects of torture on 30 January 1748, and was buried on the banks of the Ganges near Sabalpur village.

== Aftermath ==
The city was subjugated to severe plunder and extortion for three months. Guards were posted at the residences of Zain ud-Din and Haji Ahmad, and their family members were taken captive by the Afghans. Bihar faced Afghan rule for three months from 13 January which ended with the Battle of Rani Sarai on 16 April 1748. The Afghans uncovered 70 lakh rupees in cash, along with large quantities of jewels and bullion. An additional three lakh rupees or several thousand, per varying accounts were seized from Zain ud-Din's chambers.

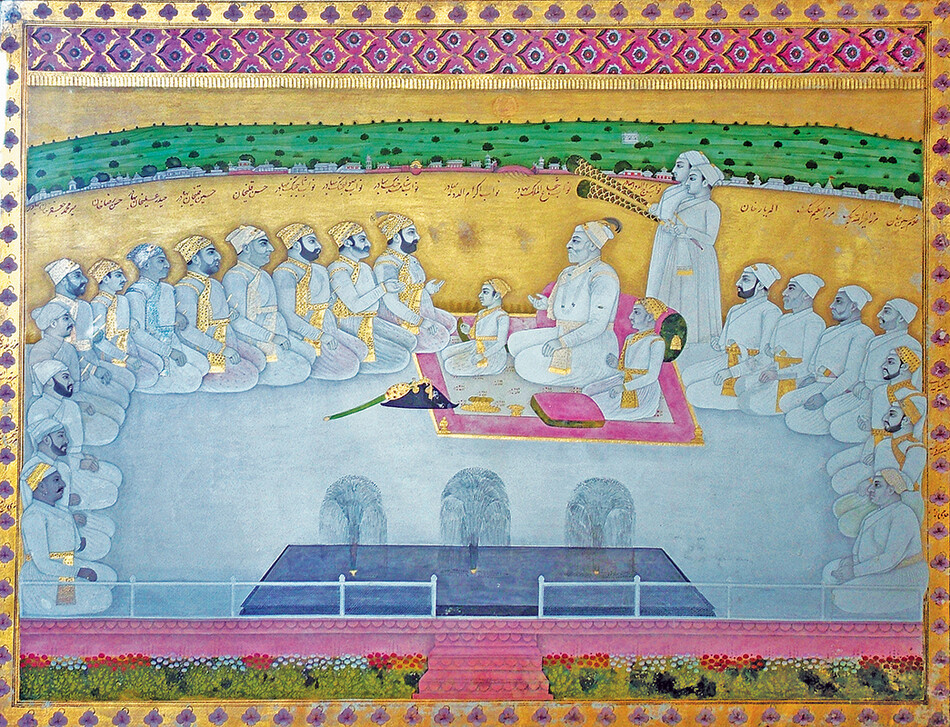
Ikram ud-Daula son of Zain ud-Din was adopted by Shahamat Jang after the death of his father Zain ud-Din Ahmad and grandfather Haji Ahmad in Patna. c. 1748

== See also ==
- Battle of Patna (1745)
- Battle of Jagdishpur (1745)

== Bibliography ==
- Thakur, Upendra (1958). "Alivardi and the Afghans of Tirhut". Proceedings of the Indian History Congress. 21: 376–392. ISSN 2249-1937.
- Datta, Kalinkar (1939). Alivardi and His Times. Calcutta: University of Calcutta.
- Sarkar, Jadunath (1964). Fall of the Mughal Empire, Volume I 1739—1754. Vol. I.
- Sarkar, Jadunath (1943). The History of Bengal. Vol. II. Ramna, Dhaka: The University of Dhaka.
- Mishra, Shree Govind (1970). History of Bihar, 1740-1772. Munshiram Manoharlal. ISBN 978-81-215-0382-2.
