= First Maratha invasion of Bengal =

Maratha invasion of Bengal Subah (1742)

First Maratha invasion of Bengal (1742)
- Part of Maratha invasions of Bengal
Date	16 April – 27 September 1742
Location	Bengal Subah (in parts of West Bengal and modern Orissa)
Result	Bengal Subah victory
Territorial changes	Status quo ante bellum

Belligerents
Bengal Subah	Maratha Empire; Kingdom of Nagpur

Commanders and leaders
Alivardi Khan; Shaikh Masum Khan †; Mir Khairullah Khan; Mustafa Khan; Shamshir Khan; Umar Khan; Sardar Khan; Raham Khan; Musahib Khan †; Saulat Jang; Muhammad Raza (POW); Mahdi Nisar Khan; Abdul Ali Khan; Zain ud-Din Ahmed Khan; Saif Khan; Mir Habib	Raghoji I Bhonsle; Bhaskar Pandit; Shesh Rao

Strength
Total: 23,000–26,000: 3,000–4,000 cavalry; 4,000–5,000 musketeers; 16,000–17,000 reinforcement	10,000 or 12,000 or 20,000 cavalry (Note: Early accounts writes between 20,000 to exaggerating figure of 80,000 while James Grant Duff put the number to 10,000 or 12,000)

Casualties and losses
Heavy	Heavy

The First Maratha invasion of Bengal occurred in 1742, led by Bhaskar Pandit under the command of Raghuji Bhonsle, the Maratha ruler of Nagpur. The Marathas aimed to collect chauth and exploit Bengal's wealth, targeting regions like Burdwan, Katwa, Murshidabad, Nadia and Hooghly.

Following the Maratha invasion, Nawab Alivardi Khan took decisive steps to counter the Maratha raids and ultimately expel them from Bengal Subah's territory. Despite the retreat, the invasion devastated Bengal's economy, with contemporary accounts reporting widespread looting and civilian hardship.

== Background ==
Mir Habib, Bengal Subah's deputy Governor of Orissa appealed Raghuji Bhonsle of Nagpur to overthrow Nawab Alivardi Khan. Raghuji Bhonsle tasked his prime minister, Bhaskar Ram, with invading Bengal to collect chauth. Bhaskar led 10,000 to 12,000 or 20,000 cavalry, moving unopposed through Orissa, defeating Bengal's Deputy Governor, Shaikh Masum Khan, and capturing his officer Durlabhram. He then advanced plundering Pachet (Modern Raniganj in Burdwan). Meanwhile, Alivardi, neglected the reports of the Maratha, believing invaders could only enter via the Rajmahal hills. However, upon reaching Sakhra near Mubarak Manzil (Modern Sahin-bandi in the Arambagh subdivision of the Hooghly district), he learned the Marathas had passed through Pachet and were approaching Burdwan, forcing him to take the threat seriously.

== Conflicts at Bardhaman ==
=== Skirmishes near Burdwan ===
After a day of marching, Alivardi with him only 3,000–4,000 cavalry and 4,000–5,000 musketeers, reached Burdwan (Bardhaman) on 15 April 1742 and encamped on the outskirt of the city. Maratha's surrounded the camps of Nawab Alivardi, looted his baggage, captured some of his horses, elephants, and camels, and cut off his food supplies and retired each evening. Alivardi sent his agents for terms. Bhaskar demanded ten lacs of rupees as a price for his return, which was refused by Alivardi. He dispatched officers to plunder the nearby villages of Burdwan.

In May 1742, Alivardi Khan, after a week-long stalemate, led a mobile force to engage the Marathas, leaving non-combatants behind. Fearing attack, they followed, impeding the army. Near Burdwan, the Marathas launched an assault. Alivardi's Afghan generals, who were discontent for various reasons, fought half-heartedly, enabling the Marathas to seize most supplies.

=== Peace negotiations ===
Alivardi proceeded to Katwa in the middle of the night. Marathas detected the move and surrounded Alivardi's army. Bengal army without supplies, faced a critical situation. To gain time, he sent envoy Mir Khairullah Khan to negotiate peace with the Marathas. Bhaskar demanded one crore of rupees and all his elephants. Despite advice to comply, Alivardi refused, preferring to reward his own troops. When the Marathas demanded his grandson Siraj-ud-daulah as a hostage, Alivardi rejected their terms. He appealed to his Afghan commanders, led by Mustafa Khan, securing their loyalty. Reinvigorated, Afghan generals (Note: Shamshir Khan, Umar Khan, Sardar Khan, Raham Khan) vowed to fight the Marathas rather than surrendering.

== Conflicts at Katwa ==
In May 1742, Alivardi Khan, marched toward Katwa, with a reduced force of 2,000–3,000 cavalry, 5,000–6,000 infantry, and minimal elephants. At Nikulsarai, the Nawab's army engaged pursuing Maratha forces in intense nocturnal combat, during which general Musahib Khan Mohmand was killed. The Marathas, utilizing a captured gun placed in a tree, bombarded Alivardi's troops. At dawn, Manikcand, minister of Burdwan's Rajah, deserted to Burdwan. The Marathas breached Alivardi's ranks. Mir Habib defected to the Marathas. Artillery superintendent under Alivardi Khan, alongside generals Afghan generals led charges against the Marathas, inflicting heavy losses, which disrupted the enemy's encirclement. This enabled Alivardi's Bengal army to reorganize into a unified force and proceed towards Katwa from Burdwan.

Alivardi reached Katwa on the fourth day of his march, but bargis had already plundered the city, looting farms and granaries and burning excess grains. Relief arrived from Murshidabad, where Saulat Jang was dispatched with provisions and essentials. After the Nawab's troops were reinforced and the rainy season began, Bhaskar planned to return to his country through Birbhum. However, Mir Habib, who had defected to the Marathas, suggested plundering the wealthy, undefended city of Murshidabad, during Alivardi's absence. Bhaskar agreed, and Mir Habib led 700 Maratha horsemen from Katwa toward Murshidabad.

== Plunder of Murshidabad ==
On May 6, 1742, Mir Habib reached Dahapada, opposite Murshidabad, and burned its bazaar. Mir Habib crossed the river and entered Murshidabad. He raided Jagat Seth Fatehcand's house, looting three lakhs in cash and goods. The Marathas also plundered other parts of the city, capturing Sarfaraz Khan’s son-in-law Murad Ali Khan and customs superintendent Mir Shujauddin. They then camped on the west bank of the Bhagirathi at Tritconah, planning to plunder Murshidabad again. Mir Habib released his own brother and family who had been imprisoned there by Alivardi Khan. His plunder accumulated between two and three crore rupees.

=== Alivardi's march to Murshidabad ===
Upon receiving intelligence of the Maratha advance, Nawab Alivardi promptly departed from Katwa. The next day he arrived at Murshidabad on 7 May 1742. In response, Mir Habib and his Maratha contingent withdrew toward Katwa, plundering and setting fire to villages along their route.

Seeking to evade Bengal's heavy monsoon rains, the Marathas began their return journey from Katwa. However, Mir Habib intercepted them in Birbhum. Persuaded, they returned to Katwa, swiftly capturing entire Gangetic region from Rajmahal to Midnapore and Jaleswar Katwah, Dnaihat, and Bhowsingbera. Subsequently, Mir Habib planned to capture Hooghly.

== Capture of Hooghly ==
Mir Habib orchestrated a conspiracy to capture the Hooghly fort. The fort's defense was severely neglected by the Nawab's faujdar, Muhammad Raza Khan, who indulged in debauchery, spending nights drinking and reveling with dancing girls. Exploiting this vulnerability, Mir Habib, accompanied by 2,000 cavalry led by Shesh Rao, approached the fort on a prearranged night. Mir Abul Hasan, misled the inebriated Muhammad Raza Khan by saying Mir Habib had arrived alone for a meeting and was waiting at the gate. Under the influence of alcohol, Muhammad Raza ordered the gate opened, allowing the Marathas to storm the fort, seize control, and imprison the Nawab's officers. Hooghly became the Maratha headquarter of Bengal and Shesh Rao was appointed as the governor of Hooghly.

== First Battle of Katwa ==
Alivardi sought help from Mughals emperor and wrote letters to deputies of Patna and Purnia. In response Naib Nazim of Patna Zainuddin Ahmed alongside Mahdi Nisar Khan, Abdul Ali Khan marched to Murshidabad with 5,000 cavalry and 6,000–7,000 infantry (Note: Totaling 11,000–12,000 infantry) while Saif Khan of Purnia led an army of 5,000 soldiers. The allied army decided for offence. Meanwhile, Bhaskar, was extravagantly celebrating Durga Puja in Dhaihat, near Katwa. Alivardi led a sudden attack on 27 September 1742, forcing Marathas to flee towards Katwa leaving their baggage behind.

Alivardi's army reached the east bank of the Bhagirathi River opposite Katwa, where the Marathas were encamped on the west bank, supported by artillery on a sloop. Alivardi planned a surprise attack on their weaker western flank of Maratha army. He secretly crossed the Ajay River using a boat bridge with 2,500 troops. During the crossing, a boat bridge collapse killed 1,500 soldiers, but it was quickly repaired. About 3,000 Bengal troops crossed the river, attacked the Maratha camp, and caused them to flee without resistance. Alivardi's forces pursued, killed many Marathas, and reinforcements arrived to chase the fugitives. Alivardi then occupied the abandoned Maratha camp for his army to rest.

== Aftermath ==
Following Maratha defeat near Katwa, Bhaskar fled to Pachet. According to Mir Habib's instructions, he then left to Midnapore, rampaging Radhabagar. Following Bhaskar's retreat to Nagpur the Maratha outposts of Burdwan, Hooghly and Hijli were abandoned. Bhaskar sent a Maratha detachment to Orissa, defeating and killing Alivardi's Deputy Governor, Shaikh Masum in a battle. Alivardi responded swiftly, moving from Pachet through Burdwan to Midnapore. Bhaskar fled toward Balasore but returned to confront Alivardi near Midnapore. In the ensuing battle, Bhaskar was defeated, losing several soldiers. Finally in December 1742, The Maratha's were driven out beyond the Chilka lake into the Deccan. Alivardi appointed Abdul Nabi Khan, uncle of Mustafa Khan in the post of Orissa's deputy Governor and returned to Murshidabad on 10 February 1743, after reconsolidating his authority over Orissa. In March, Marathas led by Raghuji and Bhaskar again invaded Bengal for the second time.

== Maratha atrocities ==
The massacres and atrocities committed by Bargis in Bengal Subah were elaborated in various chronicles by contemporary writers like Väņeśvara Vidyalańkāra, the court-pandit of the Rajah of Burdwan, Salimullah author of Tarikh-i-Bangala, and Ghulam Husain Salim, author of Riyaz-uz-Salatin. Other English and French accounts offer similar oppression. During the skirmishes in Burdwan, the Maratha troops plundered local villages, set fire granaries and food reserve. Contemporary Hindu poet author of Mahārāştrapurāņa, Gangarama's writes,

“Nobody came out for fear of the Bargis and nowhere were food-articles available. All men in the army, whether high or low, had to subsist on boiled plantain-roots. The extremities were great; not to speak of others, even the Nawab had to partake of these.”

During plunder of Murshidabad, many bankers and residents fled to places like Bhagwangola and Malda with their belongings, fearing Maratha attack. In the rainy season of 1742, Marathas conduct of widespread raids across Burdwan, Midnapore, Santal Parganas in Bihar (present-day Jharkhand) and Orissa extending as far as Balasore.

According to the chronicler Gangarama, Marathas devastated numerous locations in the districts of Burdwan, Nadia, Birbhum, Murshidabad, Bankura and Midnapore The raids effected numerous villages and localities in the districts. (Note: Gangarama mentions the effected areas included Candrakona, Midnapore, Dignagara, Khirpai, Nimgachi, Sedga, Simaila, Candipura, Syampura, Anaila, the city of Burdwan and its surrounding villages, followed by Kathara, Sarai, Damdvai, Jadupura, Bhatchala, Mirzapura, Candra, Palasi, Bainci, Beda, Samudragada, Jannagara, Nadia district, Kadai, Baithana, Cadaila, Singi, Vaska, Ghodanas, Mastaila, Gotpada, Jugudea, Pațali, Ataihat, Pataihat, Dhaihat, Bhowsingbera, and Vikihat.) The Marathas further plundered Dutch factories at Kagrama and Mowgrama before advancing to Kandi. From Kandi, they proceeded to Birbhum, ravaging much of the district and pausing at Amadahara and Maheapura before moving on to Vanavisnupura.

Gangarama's further eyewitness statements describes rape and arson. The Bargis set fire to houses, temples and villages, demanding riches. Those who failed to pay were filled with water in nostrils or drowned in tanks. Gangarama mentions the miserable conditions of the people of the ravaged areas, as follows:

The Brahmans and the Pandits ran away with their books, the 'Sonar benias' (goldsmiths) with their weights and measures, the 'Gandha-vaniks' (grocers, druggists, and perfumers) and the 'Kñasārīs' (bell-metal-workers) after closing their shops, the blacksmiths and the potters with their implements, the fishermen with their nets and ropes, and the 'Sankha-vaniks' (conch-dealers) with their own articles. The Kayasthas and the Vaidyas followed suit. The gentle ladies, who had never walked publicly on foot, went out with bag and baggage on their heads. The Kşetris and the Rajputs filed away leaving their swords behind; the Kaivartas and the agriculturists did the same with their ploughs and with paddy-seeds on the back of their oxen. The Shaikhs, the Sayyids, the Mughals and the Pathāns ran out of their villages; and pregnant women, who could not walk long, gave birth to children on the way. The poor people ran away with their humble clothes, the old walked out with their sticks, and the Chñais and the Dhanuks went out with goats Suddenly the Bargis surrounded these run-away people in the field and plundered their gold and silver to the exclusion of everything else. They cut off the hands of some, noses and ears of others, and killed many. They even ravished beautiful women, entered into the villages, and set fire to the houses. Again and again they demanded money of the people and poured water into the noses of some, who failed to supply them with it, drowned others in tanks, and instantly put many of them to death

To escape the Maratha raids and preserve their honor and wealth, some residents of West Bengal fled to Eastern and Northern Bengal, including Dacca, Maldah, and Rampur Boalia, where they settled permanently. Raja Krsnacandra of Nadia temporarily left Krşņanagar. Similarly, the mother of Rajah Tilakcandrā Rāya of Burdwan fled to Mulajor.

== See also ==
- Bargi
- Battle of Giria

== Bibliography ==
- Datta, Kalikinkar (1939). Alivardi and His Times. University of Calcutta. This article incorporates text from this source, which is in the public domain.
- Sarkar, Jadunath (1964). Fall Of The Mughal Empire 1739-1754. Vol. I (3rd ed.). Orient Longman Ltd.
- Sardesai, Govind Sakharam (1946). New History Of The Marathas. Vol. II. Bombay: Phoenix Publications.
- Sarkar, Jadunath (1943). The History of Bengal. Vol. II. Ramna, Dhaka: The University of Dhaka.
- Mehta, Jaswant Lal (2005). Advanced Study in the History of Modern India 1707-1813. Sterling Publishers Pvt. Ltd. ISBN 978-1-932705-54-6.
- Datta, K. K. (1978). "Bengal Subah (1707-1756)". In Banerjee, A.C.; Ghase, D. K. (eds.). A Comprehensive History of India: 1712-1772, edited by A. C. Banerjee and D. K. Ghase. People's Publishing House.
- Bhattacharya, Sabyasachi, ed. (2020). A Comprehensive History of Modern Bengal, 1700-1950. Vol. I. Kolkata: The Asiatic Society. ISBN 978-93-89901-95-5.
- Malik, Zahiruddin (1977). The Reign of Muhammad Shah, 1719-1748. Asia Publishing House. ISBN 978-0-210-40598-7.
- Haque, Mohammed Anwarul (1980). Muslim Administration in Orissa, 1568-1751 A.D. Punthi Pustak. Archived from the original on 2021-07-01.
- Ray, Bhabani Charan (1960). Orissa Under Marathas, 1751-1803. Kitab Mahal. Archived from the original on 2024-01-21.
- Banerji, R. D. (1951). History of Orissa. Vol. II. Calcutta: Prabasi Press.
