= Janoji of Nagpur =

Raja of Nagpur from 1755 to 1772

Janoji I
- Maharaja; Senasahib Subha
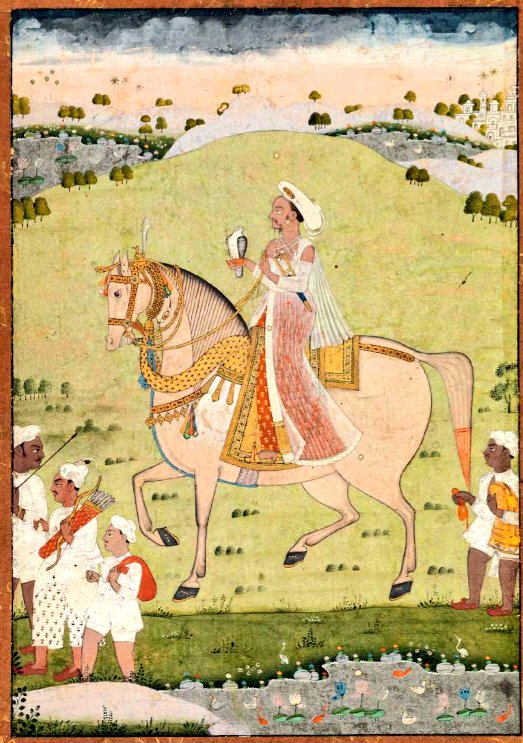
- Equestrian portrait of Janoji Bhonsle

2nd Maharaja of Nagpur
- Reign: 14 February 1755 – 21 May 1772
- Predecessor: Raghuji I
- Successor: Mudhoji I
- Born: Nagpur, Maratha Empire (present-day Nagpur, Maharashtra, India)
- Died: 21 May 1772; Nagpur, Maratha Confederacy (present-day Nagpur, Maharashtra, India)
- House: Bhonsles of Nagpur
- Father: Raghuji I
- Mother: Sulā Bai Mohite
- Religion: Hinduism
- Military career
- Conflicts: Fourth Maratha invasion of Bengal; Fifth Maratha invasion of Bengal; Battle of Rani Sarai

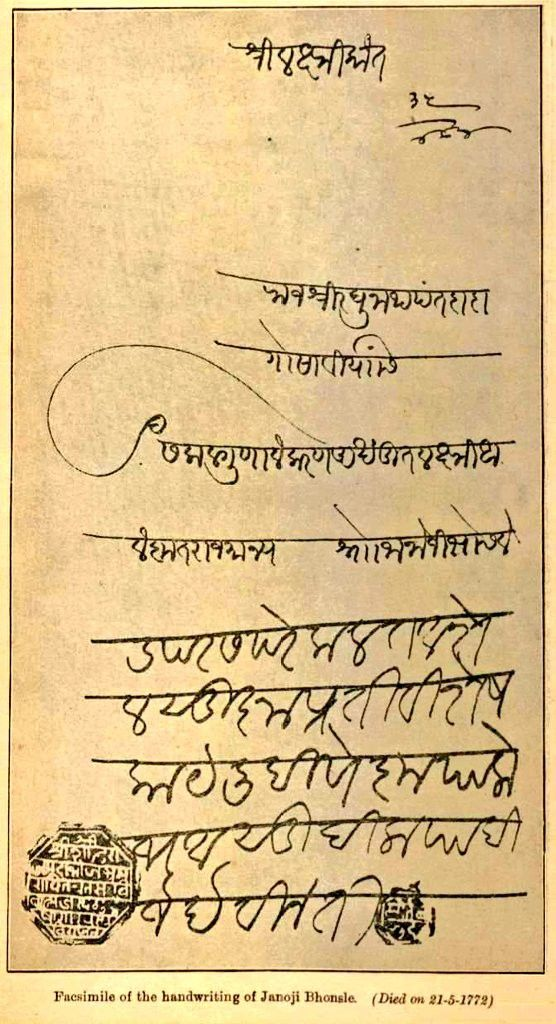
Handwriting of Janoji Bhonsle

Janoji I (Janoji Bhonsle, Marathi pronunciation: [d͡ʒaːɳod͡ʒi bʱoːsəleː]; reigned 14 February 1755 – 21 May 1772) was the second Maharaja of Nagpur from the Bhonsle dynasty. He was one of the four legitimate sons of Raghuji I. Following a succession dispute with his brothers, Janoji ascended the throne in 1755, succeeding his father as the ruler of Nagpur. He also participated in the conflict between Peshwa Madhavrao and the Nizam of Hyderabad, aligning himself with Raghunathrao. In 1765, both Madhavrao and Raghunathrao later turned against him and jointly sacked and burned the city of Nagpur. Janoji eventually agreed to pay tribute to Madhavrao. He died in 1772 without leaving an heir and was succeeded by his brother, Mudhoji I.
