= Battle of Jagdishpur (1745) =

1745 battle part of Afghan insurrections in Bengal Subah

- Part of Afghan insurrections in Bengal Subah
Date	20 June 1745
Location	Karhani village near Jagdishpur, Bihar, Bengal Subah 25°28′N 84°25′E
Result	Bengal Subah victory

Belligerents
Bengal Subah	Afghan rebels

Commanders and leaders
Zain ud-Din Ahmed Khan; Shah Din Muhammad; Raham Khan Ruleha; Raja Kirat Chand; Ahmad Khan Qureshi; Daud Khan †; Khadem Husain Khan (WIA); Mahdi Nisar Khan; Naqi Ali Khan; Shah Jahan Yar; Raja Sundar Singh; Raham Khan Ruhela; Karam Khan; Raja Ram Narain; Hashim Ali Khan	Mustafa Khan †; Murtaza Khan

Strength
13,000–14,000	18,000 cavalry 15,000 infantry

Casualties and losses
Unknown	Unknown
- Location within Bihar Battle at Jagdishpur (India)

The Battle of Jagdishpur was a decisive engagement in 1745 during the Afghan insurrections in Bengal (1745–1748), pitting the forces of the Nawab of Bengal, Zain-ud-Din Ahmed Khan, against the Afghan rebel Mustafa Khan. Depleted by his failed Patna campaign, Mustafa Khan led another attempt to capture the Bihar province. In a fierce battle near Jagdishpur, Mustafa Khan was shot dead by musket fire; his head was severed and displayed on a spear atop his elephant, causing the Afghan army to flee under his son Murtaza.

== Background ==
Following Mustafa Khan's defeat at the battle of Patna, determined to capture Bihar, decided to assault once more time. He promptly repaired his artillery and arms and recruited fresh troops from various regions. Within three months, before the rains began, he assembled an army of 18,000 cavalry and 15,000 infantry.

Mustafa Khan left Chunar before the monsoon of 1745, entered Shahabad, and allied with zamindar Udwant Singh Ujjainia of Jagdishpur, who had been hostile to Zain-ud-Din.

== Battle ==
On June 2, 1745, Zain-ud-Din promptly departed from Patna at the head of an army of 13,000–14,000 men, accompanied by generals like Shah Din Muhammad, Raham Khan Ruleha and others. They then forded the Sone River at Koilwar, and next day advanced 12 miles south-west by south to Karhani (in Shahabad) on the edge of the jungle of Jagdishpur. Two miles beyond this village the enemy were sighted and the battle joined on June 20, 1745.

Mustafa's forces and equipment had been severely depleted due to his financial exhaustion following the failed Patna campaign, which had consumed his treasury. Raja Kyretchand, (Note: Spelled Kirat Chand) mounted on an elephant, commanded the right flank of Zain ud-Din's army with 5,000 cavalry and several thousand infantry, reinforced by Ahmad Khan Qureshi and Jaswantnagar with their troops. Mustafa Khan chased and routed Zain ud-Din's vanguard under Kirat Chand, killing Daud Khan and several young soldiers. Khadem Husain Khan was also wounded. Mustafa Khan seized his guns.

Mustafa Khan launched a desperate charge at Zain-ud-Din. Abdul Ali Khan resolved to make a bold stand once more. He was soon reinforced by Mahdi Nisar Khan, Naqi Ali Khan, Shah Jahan Yar, Raja Sundar Singh, Raham Khan Ruhela, Karam Khan, and Raja Ram Narain, and advanced to oppose Mustafa Khan.

Mustafa routed the Nawab's vanguard; however, he was immediately struck by a musket ball on his chest and lost his consciousness. He soon regained his senses and renewed his charge against Zain ud-Din. Under the order of Zain ud-Din, Hashim Ali Khan mounted the rebel leader's elephant, beheaded Mustafa Khan, and displayed his head on a spear. The Afghan seeing their general's death collapsed into flight. Rajah Kirat Chand pursued the Afghan soldiers to their camp and captured their tents, horses and baggages. The Afghans retreated to the village of Magror (Note: 14 miles west of Chainpur, Saharsa, Bihar on the bank of the Karmanasa River) under the command of Mustafa's son, Murtaza Khan, and the surviving officers.

== Aftermath ==
Mustafa Khan's decapitated body was taken to Patna, and was dissected into two halves. The bisected body was hung at the city's western and eastern gates before burial in Sher Shah's mosque compound, on Zainuddin's orders. This battle decisively ended first Afghan insurrection in Bengal. Zain ud-Din emerging victorious returned to Patna. The news of victory reached to Alivardi. In the meantime, Raghuji Bhonsle had invaded Odisha, and captured Cuttack with its governor Durlabhram.

== See also ==
- Battle of Patna (1745)
- Battle of Bhagalpur (1745)

== Bibliography ==
- Datta, Kalikinkar (1939). Alivardi and His Times. University of Calcutta.
- Sarkar, Jadunath (1964). Fall Of The Mughal Empire 1739-1754. Vol. I (3rd ed.). Orient Longman Ltd.
- Sarkar, Jadunath (1943). The History of Bengal. Vol. II. Ramna, Dhaka: The University of Dhaka.
- Thakur, Upendra (1958). "Alivardi and the Afghans of Tirhut". Proceedings of the Indian History Congress. 21: 376–392. ISSN 2249-1937. JSTOR 44145227.
- Datta, K. K. (1978). "Bengal Subah (1707-1756)". In Banerjee, A.C.; Ghase, D. K. (eds.). A Comprehensive History of India: 1712-1772, edited by A. C. Banerjee and D. K. Ghase. People's Publishing House.
