= Munger Fort =

Fort in Munger, Bihar, India

- Part of Bihar
- Bihar, India
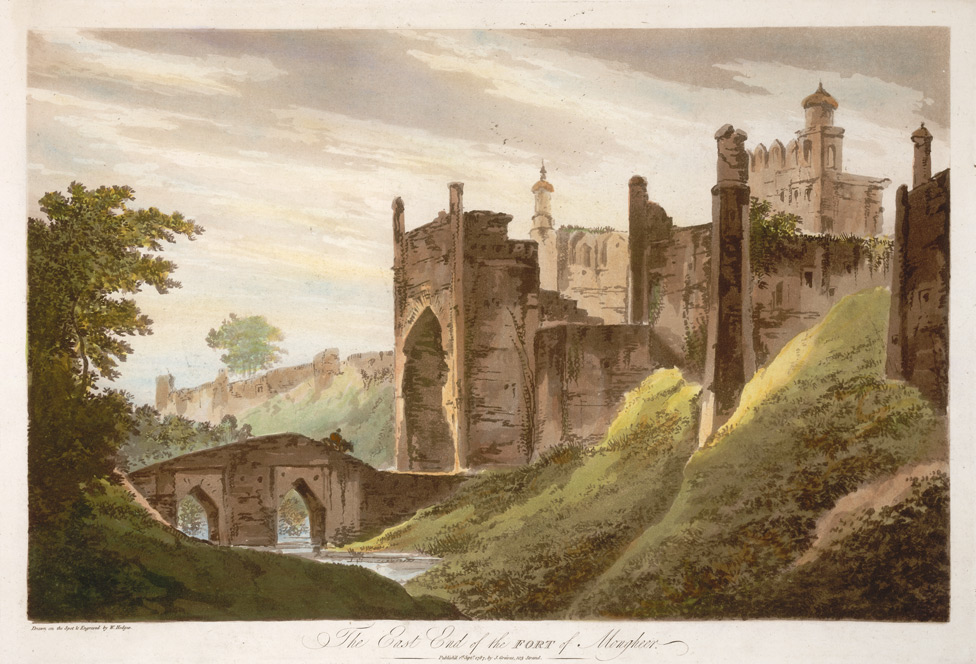
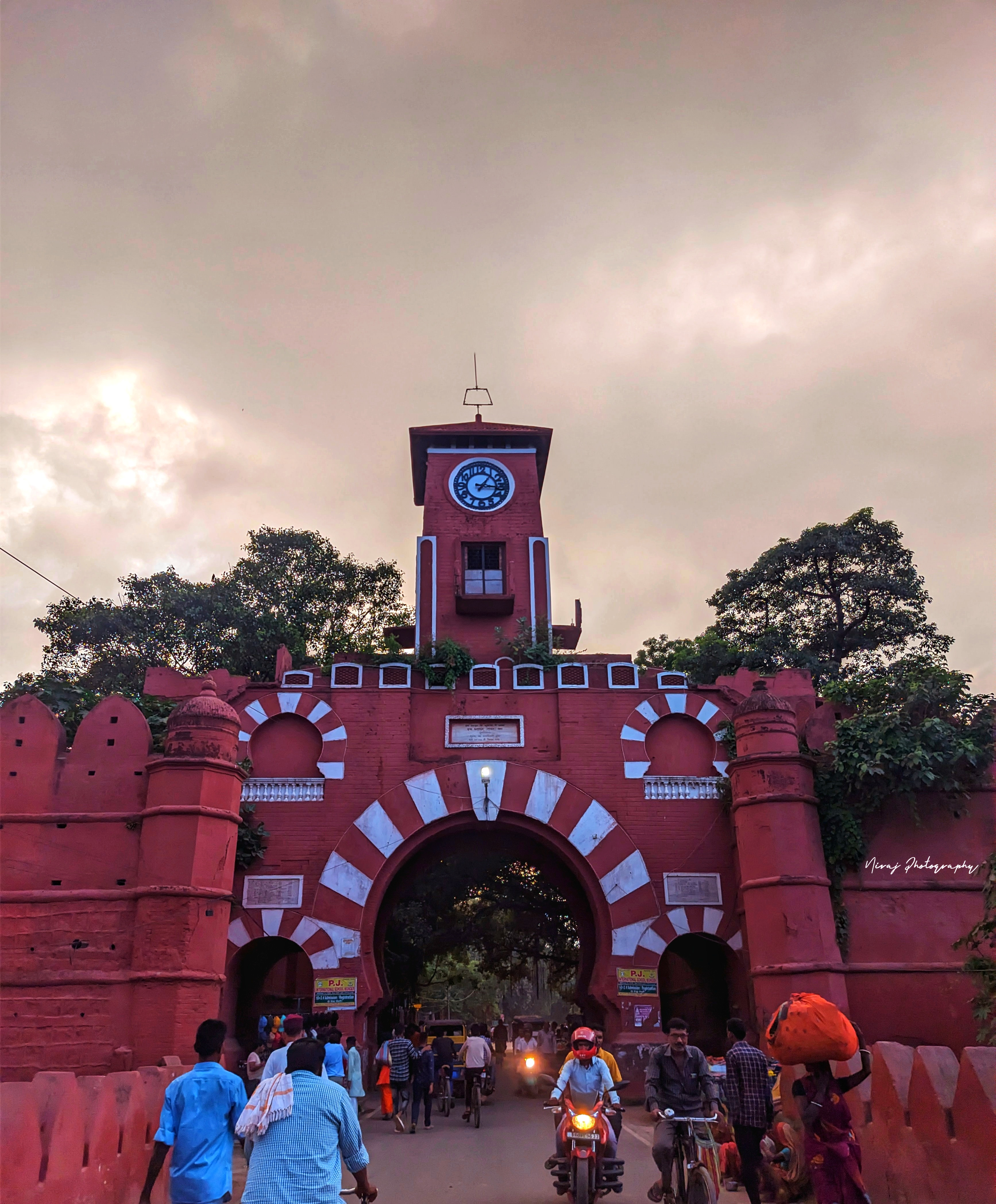
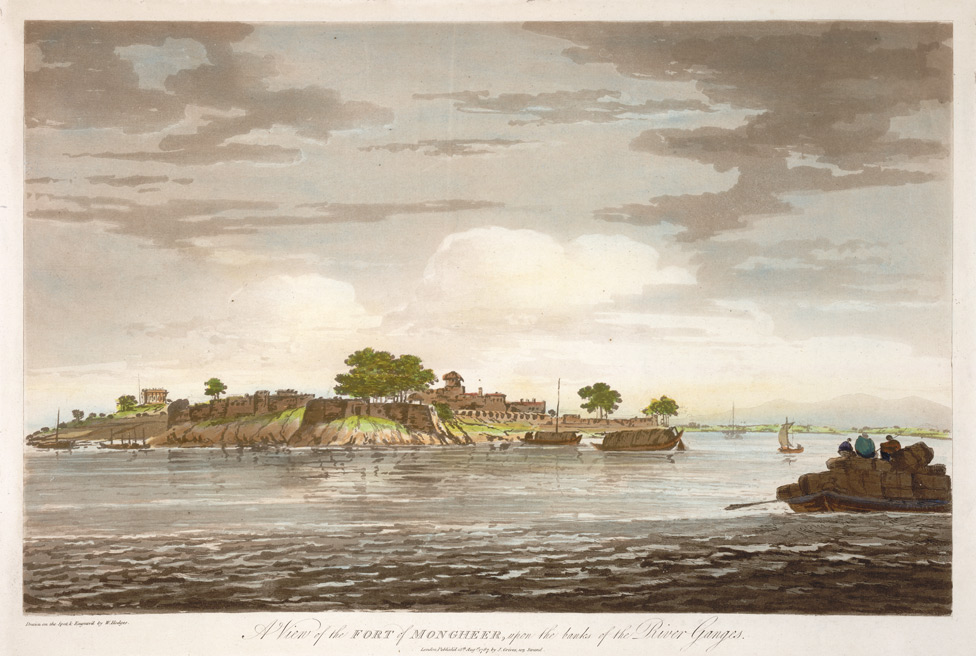
- East end view of the Munger Fort

Site information
- Type: Fort
- Controlled by: Government of Bihar
- Condition: Ruins

Location
- Location within Bihar
- Coordinates: 25.3803°N 86.4658°E

Site history
- Built: 10th century
- Materials: Granite Stones and lime mortar

The Munger Fort, located at Munger (also spelt as Monghyr during the British Raj), in the state of Bihar, India, is built on a rocky hillock on the south bank of the Ganges River. Its history is not completely dated but it is believed that it was built during the early rule of Slave dynasty of India. The Munger town where the fort is situated was under the control of Muhammad bin Tughluq of Delhi (1325–1351 CE). The fort has two prominent hills called the Karnachaura or Karanchaura, and the other a built up rectangular mound deduced to be the location of a citadel of the fort with historical links. The fort had a succession of Muslim rulers (Khaljis, Tughlaqs, Lodis, Nawabs of Bengal, followed by Mughal rulers, till it was finally acceded to the British by Mir Quasim (1760–72), after unseating his father-in-law Mīr Jafar on the grounds of old age, for a monetary reward negotiated by Vansittart. This deal involved payment by the East India Company's merchants of an ad valorem duty of 9 percent, against an Indian merchant's duty of 40%. The fort became a place of considerable importance to the British in Bengal till 1947 (Indian independence).

The fort houses a number of religious and historic monuments such as the Tomb of Pir Shah Nufa (died 1497), Palace of Shah Suja, Tomb of Mulla Muhammad Said (died 1704 CE), the Kashtaharini Ghat on the Ganges River, Chandisthana (an ancient temple) and an 18th-century British cemetery. In recent times, a famous School of Yoga was established here.

== Etymology ==
The etymology of the word Munger prefixed to the fort and to the town also called by the same name is Mudgagiri with links to the Mahbharata epic. A copper plate inscription of Devapala alludes to Munger. Another version is that the name could have derived from either sage Mudgala or Maudgalyayana, a disciple of Buddha. A further explanation by General Cunningham is that it could have been named after the Mundas, its earliest inhabitants. C.E.A. Oldham gives a version that it was a "Munigriha" (the hermitage of a saint Muni). During British rule it was often spelt Monghyr or Monghir.

== History ==
The Fort's history has been traced from 1330 AD onwards, under the rule of Muhammad bin Tughluq of Delhi. But its ancient history, as a town, mostly ruled by Hindu kings, is initially traced from a stone inscription to Chandragupta (4th century CE), (after whom it was initially called Gupta Garhis) and later dated to the kingdom of Anga, the capital of which was at Champa near Bhagalpur, and the Pala kings in the 9th century AD.

Medieval period

Munger, which was under the rule of the Karnataka dynasty of Mithila, was taken over by Bhaktiyar Khalji in 1225 AD and subsequently under the Khalji ruler, Gyasuddin Khalji.

Muslim rule

For a brief period, it came under the control of Sultan of Bengal between 1301 CE and 1322 CE, following a peace treaty with Khaljis. This was followed by annexation of the area to Delhi by Muhammad bin Tughluq, during 1342 CE.

Inscriptions reveal that repairs were carried out to the fort during the reign of Prince Danyal of Bengal (son of Sultan Alauddin Husain Shah) who held the post of Governor of Bihar, after the defeat of Jampur rulers by the Sultan of Bengal. It is also stated that Prince Danyal of Bengal built the shrine of Sufi saint Shah Nafah within the south gate of the fort, in 1497 AD.

Suri rule

In 1534 CE, in a battle which took place in the plains of Surajgarha, the formidable army of Ibrahim Khan of Munger was defeated and he was killed by Sher Shah Suri who established the Suri Empire. Thus, the fort came under Sher Shah Suri's overlordship (1486 – 22 May 1545). In the subsequent war that took place between Sher Shah and Humayun, the Mughal Emperor, Munger was the centre of battle between the Afghan and the Mughals. Sher Shah won and the Mughal rule was substituted by Afghan rule.

In 1590, the importance of the fort was enhanced by making it the headquarters of Bihar army of the rulers of Gaur under their general named Kutub Khan. Nasrat Shah had succeeded Hussain Shah in Bengal and his brother-in-law, Makhdun Alam, was given control of the Munger fort, which he, in turn, passed on to his general Kutub Khan.

Mughal rule

From the time of the reign of Akbar in the late 16th century, Monghyr was controlled by the Mughal Emperors. Raja Todar Mal, Minister in the Mughal Empire had camped at this fort when he was deputed to put down the rebel forces of Bengal. He substantially refurbished the fortifications of the fort. After a series of intriguing changes in the governorship of Munger Shah Shuja, the second son of Shah Jahan, the Mughal Emperor and Aurangzeb's brother, had fled to this place to escape persecution, during his fight with his brothers for power. He was made governor of the region after protracted negotiations with his brothers Dara Shikoh, Murad and Aurangzeb, and under the treaty of 1658 Munger was added to Shuja's reign. Shuja built a palace on the west side of the fort, which has been described as " very large house where the king (Suja) lived, walled next to the river, for about one and half Kos with bricks and stones, with a wall fifteen yards high".

However, in 1745, Mustafa Khan, a rebel leader under General Alivardi Khan took control of the fort when its defences had weakened. After a few days of stay in the fort, he continued his campaign towards Patna with lots of guns and ammunition taken from the fort.

In the 4th Maratha war of 1744, the Maratha army had raided through Bihar and Munger. Jean Law, the French adventurer and partisan of Siraj ud-Daulah (1733 – 2 July 1757), the last independent Nawab of Bengal, Bihar and Orissa was running away after the Battle of Plassey. In July 1757, the British attempted an attack on the fort. Eyre Coote, the British officer (heading the British force) reached Munger in pursuit of Jean Low. But he could not enter the well-fortified fort. He did not dare to attack the fort because the fort garrison had lined up "the ramparts with their matches held near the cannons." But the governor of the fort provided him boats.

In February 1760, Major Caillaud of the Nawab of Bengal and his supporters defeated the Mughal Emperor Shah Alam II (1728–1806). The emperor and his army moved out not only from the fort but also from the district. With this victory, the rule of Mir Qasim, the Nawab of Bengal began with Johan Stables, in charge of Munger fort, launching a successful attack on the Raja of Kharagpur who had opposed the Nawab of Bengal.

Nawab of Bengal's rule

Monghyr was thus occupied by Mir Qasim Ali, the Nawab of Bengal (from 1760 to 1764). In 1763, Quasim shifted his capital from Murshidabad to Munger. His new appointee General Gurgin Khan from Isfahan patterned the Bengal Army on the lines of the British forces. At this fort, a factory for arsenal, for manufacturing of fire-arms was established. This tradition has continued to this day; several hundred families who have specialised in the manufacture of guns are continuing with this old tradition. He further added to the fortifications and also built palaces in the fort. Mir Quasim came to be known as a just ruler (he tried to eliminate corruption and injustice) but was also feared by his opponents as a fierce and ruthless warrior. He was also known for encouraging culture and had many scholars in his court. But all this ended soon as he had serious differences on trade and other administrative practices with the British. Mir Qasim later had to use the fort as a base for waging war against the British. But he was defeated in 1764. Later, he turned out to be a poor looser as he disgraced himself by committing serious atrocities on his own people in Munger fort and also in Patna, and also on the English army and other personnel who were captured in Patna. His criminal atrocities in Patna are known in the historical annals as the ‘Massacre of Patna’. Subsequently, the fort lost its glory. Lord Cornwallis, the governor general, in British India, had built a country house here.

British rule

History also records a "White Mutiny" by disgruntled officers of the East India Company (who controlled the fort) in the precincts of the Munger Fort, which was put down in 1766 by Lord Clive. The mutiny broke out over the reduction of an extra monthly payment called bhatta to soldiers on active duty. After the suppression of the mutiny, a small garrison was thereafter stationed at the fort. Over the years, the maintenance of the fort was neglected.

The old British cemetery, also known as Lal Darwaza cemetery, lay just north-west of the north gate of Munger (Monghyr) Fort. It held monuments dating from the late 18th and early 19th centuries, included many obelisk tombs. The earliest of these monuments consisted of a massive black stone pillar, probably once part of a temple, which was erected to the memory of a youth named Stewart, who died at Munger in 1769. The latest monument was from 1862; shortly after which, the cemetery was closed. The Munger Fort was a place of considerable importance to the British East India Company and the British Raj until India's independence in 1947. The cemetery served as a final resting place for British officers and other personnel who died while stationed there.

== Structure ==
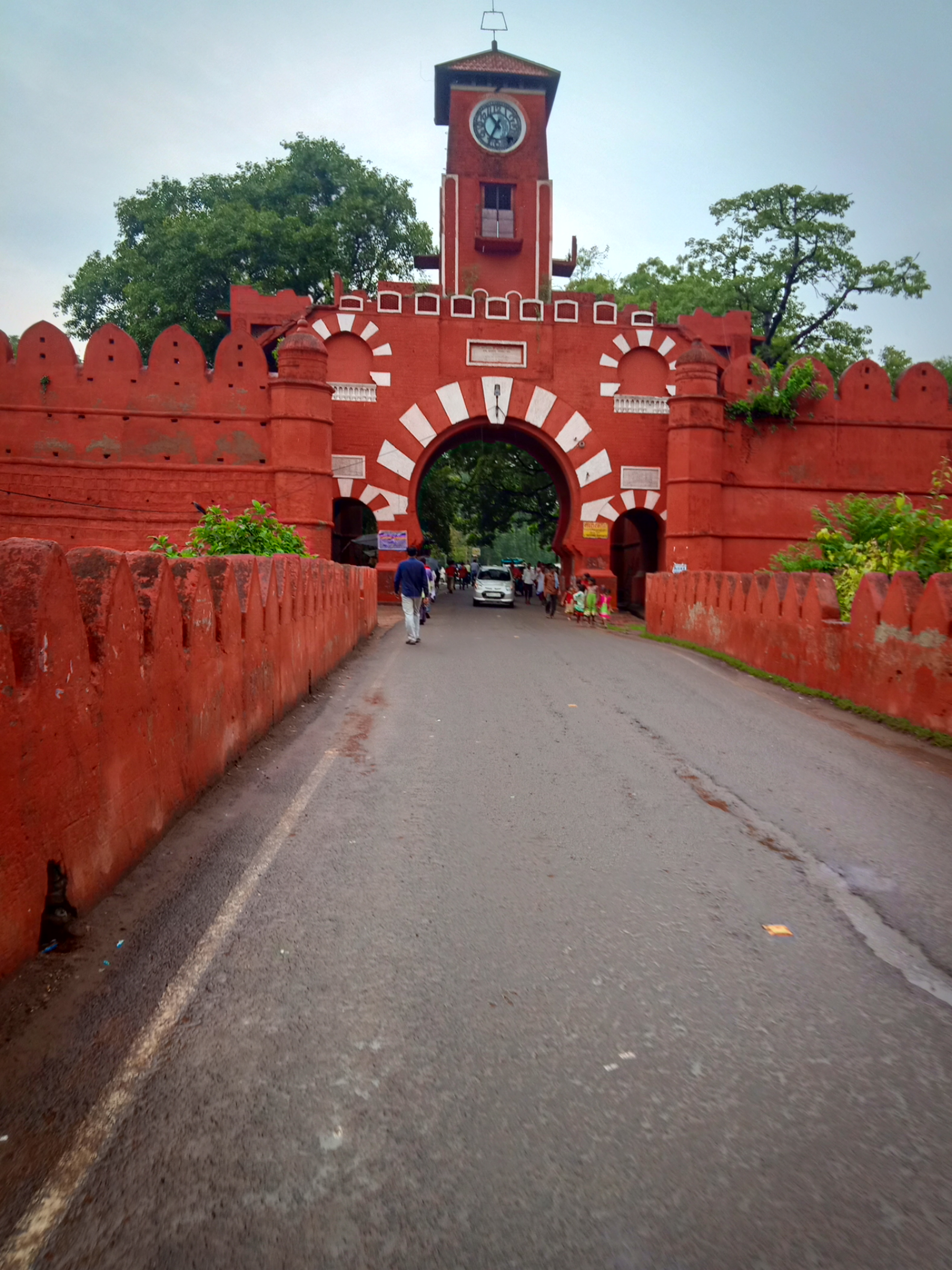
Fort of munger

Under the Mughal rule, the fort was substantially expanded as a strong military fortification. The fort was an impressive structure with massive gates, one of which had been a strong fortification with square towers, with a deep moat. The moat was 175 feet (53 m) in width, surrounding the land side of the fort, thus making it strategically formidable. It opens to the Ganges river (which is 2 kilometres (1.2 mi) wide here, but crossed only by boats) at either end thus enhancing the fort's security.

The fort is spread over an area of 222 acres (90 ha) over rocky hills with a peripheral length of 2.5 miles (4.0 km). The fort has 4 feet (1.2 m) thick inner walls while the outer walls are 12 feet (3.7 m) thick forming the fortification, which is 30 feet (9.1 m) thick. The intervening space of 14 feet (4.3 m) between the inner and outer walls is filled with earth. The Ganges river hugs the fort walls on the west and partly in the north. On the landward side, there is a 175 feet (53 m) wide moat, which acts as a defence to the fortifications. There are four entry gates, within the octagonal fortress, with ramparts. The main gateway, called the Lal Darwaza, is still in good shape, even though the rest of the fort is mostly in ruins. This gate has a carved stone, which is said to belong to a Hindu or a Buddhist structure.

== Other monuments in the fort ==
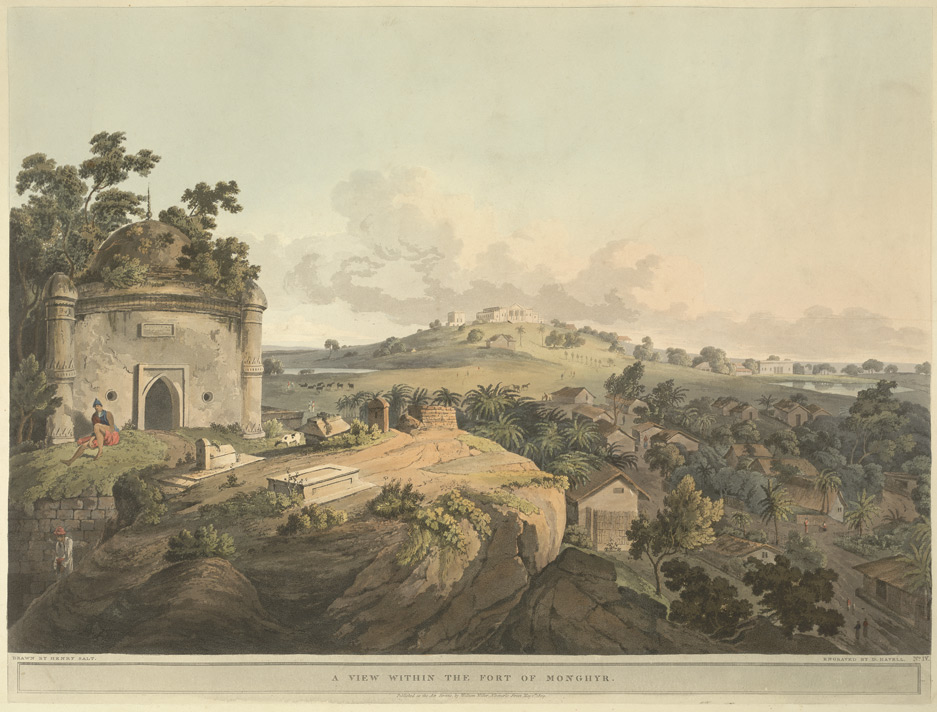
A view within the fort of Munger

The famous monuments located within the fort are:

Tomb of Pir Shah Nufa

Pir Shah Nufa, originally of Persin origin, was a Sufi saint who was sent to Munger by his guru Khwaja Moinuddin Chishti of Ajmer. His tomb dating his death to A.H. 596 (1177 AD) is located near a rampart in the fort close to the southern gate. It was built over an area of 100 feet (30 m) square with retaining walls supporting all round, on a 25 feet (7.6 m) high heap of earth . The carved stones of these ancient ruins were pitted by holes and depressions, with the belief that such disfiguring would cure certain diseases of children. The domed tomb chamber, 16 feet (4.9 m) square with circular turrets, also encloses a prayer room and a restroom.

Palace of Shah Shuja

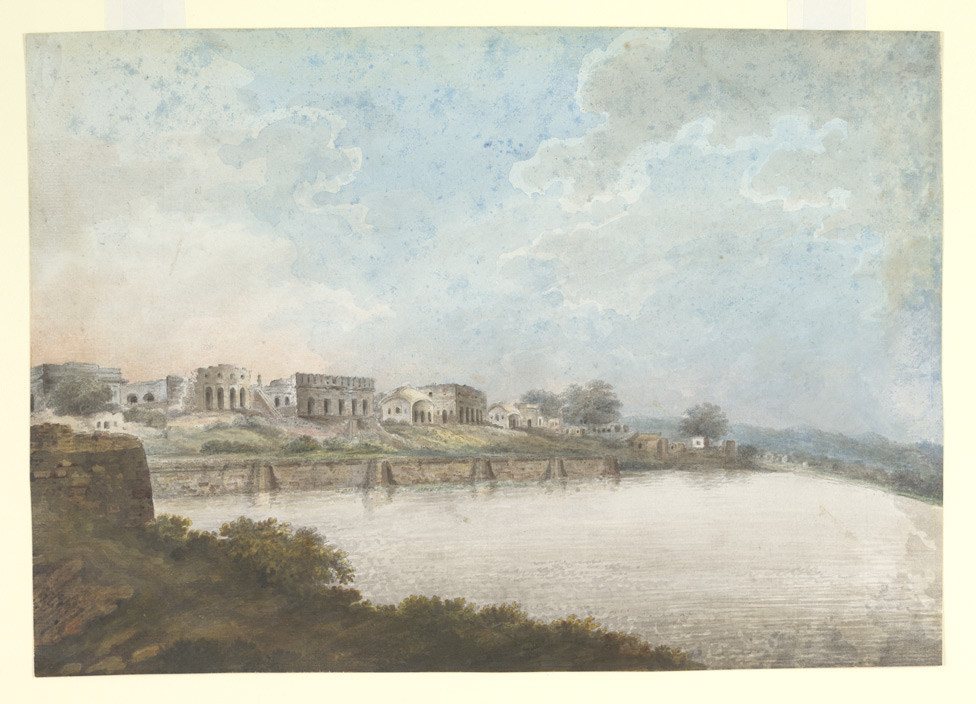
The old Shuja palace buildings within the Munger Fort

Though locally known as the 'Palace of Shuja', the Mughal Prince, it is inferred to have been built earlier by Nawab Mir Qasim Ali, who also ruled from Munger. The palace is bounded by high rise walls on three sides and the Ganges river on the west side. As in any palace of the Mughals, it consisted of a Khas Mahal or 'Zanana Palace', the 'Diwane-I-Am' or Public Audience Hall and the Tope-Khana or Armoury (made of 10–15 feet (3.0–4.6 m) thick walls) (now a dormitory). There was also a mosque on the west side of the palace, now in ruins, but used as storehouse. There was a hammam (bathhouse) and a dressing room to the west of the present day jailer's office. An interesting feature noted below the floor of the mosque is a dry well or pit of 10–12 feet (3.0–3.7 m) depth, which leads to several tunnels running in different directions. The well was, in earlier times, connected to the river through an opening, which has since been shored up. The Khas Mahal of the palace and the Public Audience Hall inside the fort, which are now seen mostly in ruins, are used as a jail and a school for the convicts.

Tomb of Mulla Muhammed Said

Tomb of Mullah Mohammed Said was situated on the bastion at the south-west of the fort, but has since been removed. Mulla Mohammed Said hailing from Mazandran near the Caspian Sea, was a Persian poet (under the nom-de-plume of Ashraf). He was employed by Emperor Aurangzeb to tutor his daughter Zebunnisa Begum. He was also under the employment of Azim Shah, grandson of Aurangzeb, and who was the viceroy of Bihar. The Mullah, while on his way from Bengal to Mecca, died at Munger fort in 1704 and his tomb existed inside the fort.

The Kashtaharini Ghat on the Ganges

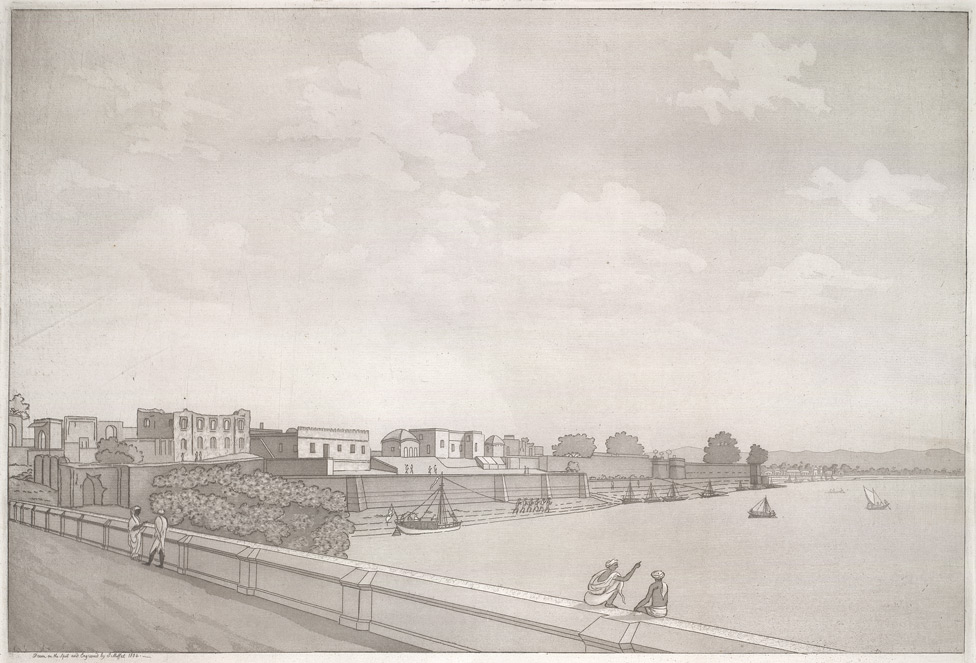
River front view of Munger with the ghats

The Ganges river that flows in front of Munger fort takes a turn in its flow direction towards the north ('Uttara vahini' in Sanskrit means: "north flowing"). At this location, a ghat (stepped approach to the river edge from the high bank built in stones) was constructed, which has a legend linked to it. An inscription at Kannauj records that Govind Chandra of Kannauj, a Gahadvala King, granted land on the bank of the river to build a ghat, after bathing in the Ganges river at Mudgagiri (Munger) on the occasion of the Hindu festival known as Akshaya Tritiya. There are several antiquities that have been unearthed at this ghat such as: an inscription of about the 10th century AD on the wall of the gateway that refers to king Bhagiratha and the construction of a Shiva temple; discovery of carvings and sculptures by archaeologist Bloch in 1903; an inscribed image of Dhyani Buddha (Buddha in meditation pose) describing the Buddhist doctrine; preserved now in the Indian Museum at Kolkata). Hence, this location is venerated by the Hindus.

Chandisthana

Chandisthana (meaning: place of goddess Chandi) is the location of a shrine, which is a village deity of goddess Chandi (Chandi or Caṇḍīika is the name by which the Supreme Goddess is referred to in Devi Mahatmya). It is considered as one of the 64 Shakta pithas (a tantric cultural centre) in India. It is depicted in the form of a hole in a rock dated to the rule of king Karna Vikrama. The conjecture that it could be part of an ancient temple that existed here is yet to be established by archaeologists by exploration of the area.

Karnachaura

A natural rocky hillock dated to the ancient Raja Karna is named after him as the 'Karnachaura' or 'Karanchaura' or 'Karan Chabutara' (meaning: slab of Raja Karan). It is the highest point in the fort. Since the location commands a fine view of the surroundings, Raja Karan (he was a contemporary of Vikramaditya, the famous king of India) had built a house on the hill, which was later converted by the British to a saluting battery. In 1766, this base on the hill was crucial in subduing rebellion by some European officers of the garrison. Further refurbishing of the fort occurred during General Goddard's time when it was converted as the large residence (as it exists now) of the Commanding Officer of the British garrison. This building was later under the ownership of Maharaja of Vizianagram and then by the Raja of Murshidabad. Since 1978, it is under the ownership of the Bihar School of Yoga. Swami Satyananda Saraswati founder of the Yoga School has renamed it as 'Ganga Darshan'. The Yoga School is now renowned as a world centre for modern yogic/tantric renaissance. An old platform near the hill, in front of the bungalow, is also linked to the period of King Karna and his wife.

Rectangular mound

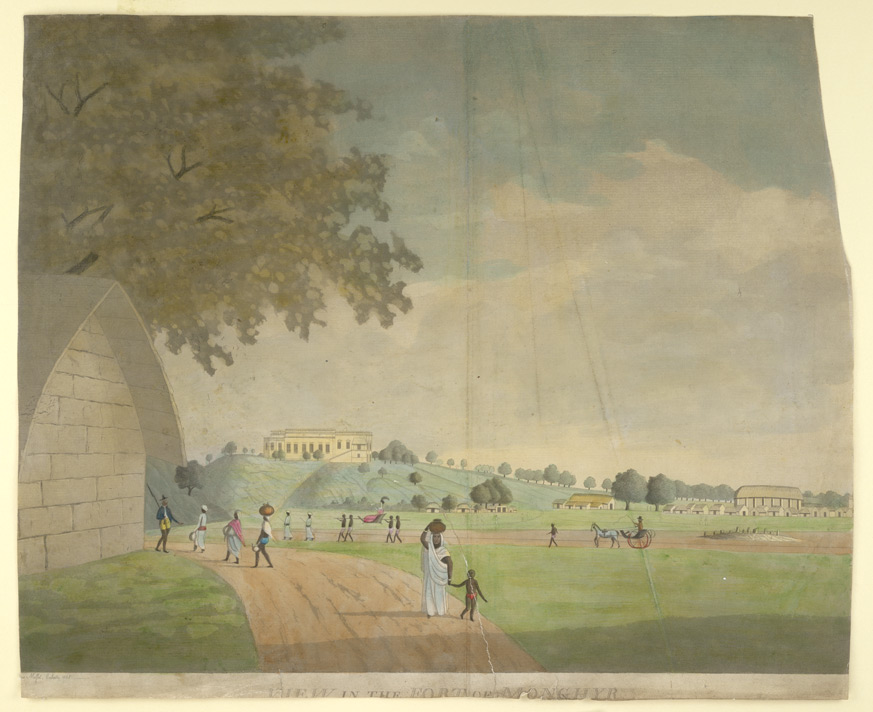
People walking about within the fort near Shuja palace grounds

The second famous rock hillock (no specific name is given to this) within the fort is, in fact, an artificial rectangular raised platform where a citadel of the fort probably existed in the past. An old building called as 'Damdama Kothi' ('kothi' means "house"), conjectured to have been built by Muslim rulers or even earlier Hindu kings that existed here, was destroyed by the British to build the 'Collector's Bangalow'. When this strong Kothi (a masonry structure) was demolished by blasting, underground rooms were found. In addition, in a well in the compound of the bungalow, two arched passages were found; one lead to the house and the other in an opposite direction to the Shuja palace (now a prison). Stone carvings and sculptures were seen in exposed masonry of the Kothi, during Buchanan's archaeological explorations.

Bihar School of Yoga

The Bihar School of Yoga founded by Swami Satyananda Saraswati in 1964 to impart traditional yoga teachings to the world is headquartered inside the Munger fort. Apart from providing spiritual instruction to candidates, the school undertakes yoga projects and medical research in association with other agencies. It is the World's first Yoga University and a deemed university. It attracts students from all over the world. Around 400 Australians, Americans and others register for the yoga course every year, with this figure rising continuously.

== Visitor information ==
Munger fort and the Munger town are well connected by road, rail and air communications through Patna, the capital city of Bihar. Patna is connected by air to all major cities in India. It has a very good network of rail and road links with all major cities in the country. The road distance from Patna to Munger is 173 kilometres (107 mi).

The Ganges river, which has been declared as the National Waterway 1 flows to the south bank of the Munger town. It extends from Varanasi in Uttar Pradesh to Kolkata in West Bengal. En route, the towns covered are Bhagalpur, Munger, Patna and Buxar. A tourist cruise service authorised under a Memorandum of understanding with Inland Waterways Authority of India (IWAI) has been launched recently to cover this navigational route to visit several tourist destinations, including Munger fort.
