= Battle of Patna (1745) =

1745 battle between Alivardi and Afghan rebels of Bihar

- Part of Afghan insurrections in Bengal Subah
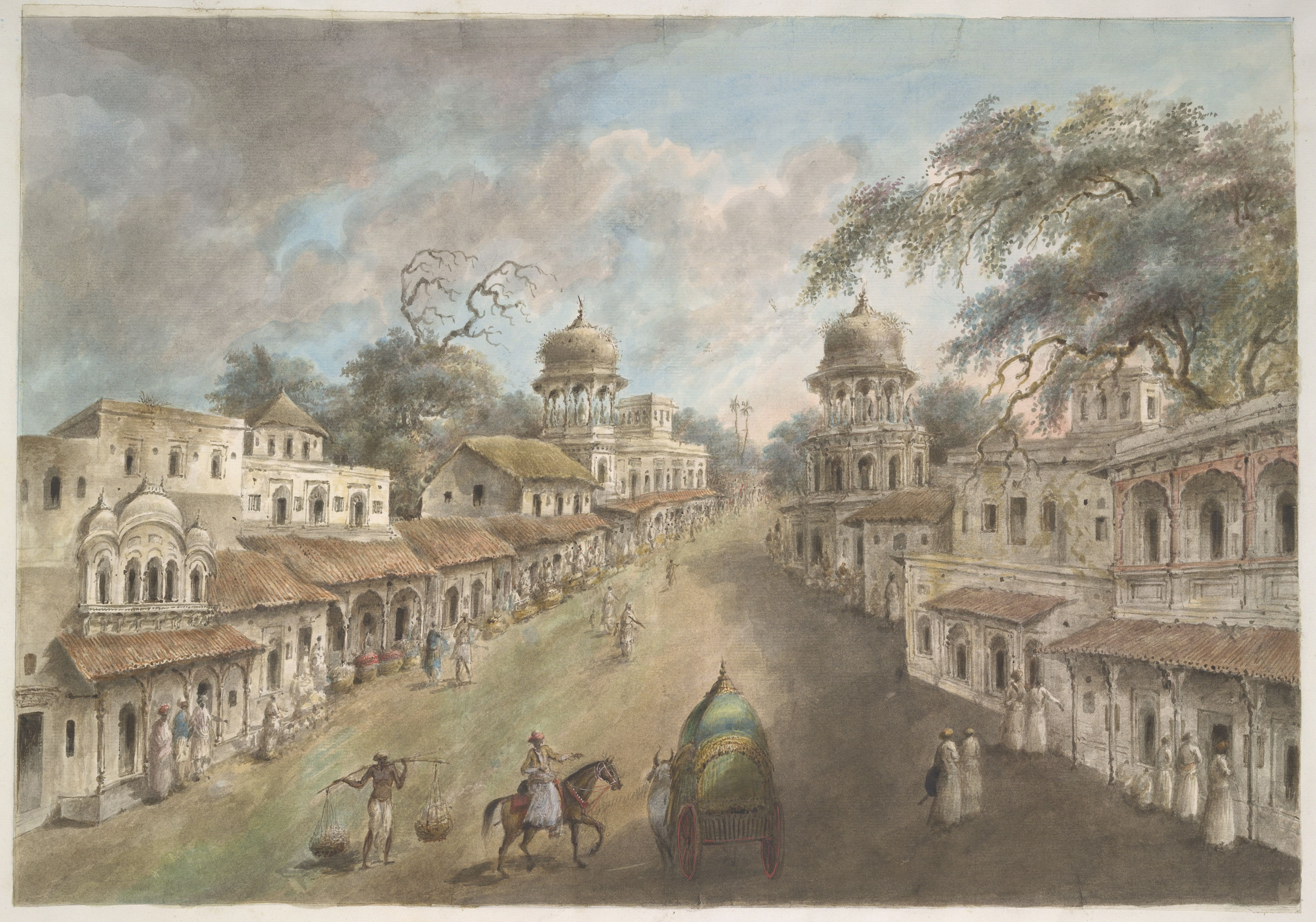
- The Chowk and the main street of Patna c. 1814–15
Date	14–21 March, 1745
Location	Patna, Bihar, Bengal Subah
Result	Bengal Subah victory

Belligerents
Bengal Subah	Afghan rebels

Commanders and leaders
Zain ud-Din Ahmed Khan; Abdul Ali Khan; Ahmad Khan Qureshi; Raja Kyretchand; Rajah Ram Narain; Khadem Husain Khan; Nasir Ali Khan; Zulfiqar Khan Mewati; Raja Kirat Singh; Muhammad Jahan Yar Khan	Mustafa Khan (WIA); Buland Khan Ruhela; Abdul Rasul Khan; Udal Shah †; Hakim Shah †; Murtaza Khan

Strength
14,000–15,000	14,000–15,000 or 20,000 soldiers 150 elephants 50 artilleries

Casualties and losses
Unknown	300 generals and chieftains

The Battle of Patna (1745) was a conflict between the army of Nawab Alivardi Khan and his former Afghan generals. Led by the renegade general Mustafa Khan, the rebels invaded Bihar and stormed Munger Fort. They proceeded towards Patna and planned to capture the city on 14 March, but was repelled by its governor Zain ud-din Ahmed Khan in a fierce battle outside the city walls. Mustafa Khan renewed attacks on 21 March before being defeated and expelled from Bihar.

== Background ==
In February 1745, Mustafa Khan marched for Patna at the head of eight or nine thousand cavalry to seize the Bihar province from Zain ud-din Ahmed Khan. He seized some elephants, guns, and ammunition at Rajmahal. His nephew Abdul Rasul Khan, the Deputy Governor of Orissa, joined him with his forces. Mustafa Khan successfully sieged the Munger Fort defeating it's garrison and seized cannons and some ammunition. After staying there for three days, he marched for Patna.

Zain ud-din Ahmed Khan received a warning from Nawab Alivardi Khan of Afghan rebels and was urged to flee to Murshidabad via the northern bank of the Ganges, thereby avoiding Mustafa Khan's route. Instead, he chose the more courageous path of defending the province under his command. Hastening back to his capital from Tirhut, he swiftly devised an effective plan to secure Patna.

== Prelude ==
Zain ud-din, summoning his detachments from the outposts, along with all local nobles and loyal zamindars, (Note: Ahmad Khan Qureshi, Shaikh Jahan Yar, Shaikh Hamiduddin, Shaikh Amrullah, Karam Khan, Ghulam Jeelani, Khadem Husain Khan, Jaswant Nagar, Hajah Kyretchand, Rajah Kam Narain, Korar Singh and other Hindu commanders, were directed to raise new levies.) he quickly assembled some 14,000–15,000 fighters around him. Some Zamindars of the province, namely Sundar Singh of Tikari, Namdar Khan of Narhat and Samai, Bishun Singh of Seres and Cotombah, Pahalwan Singh and his brother Sabuthar Singh of Sasaram and Chainpur, and Bharat Singh of Arwal, offered their services to him. By mid of March 1745, Mustafa Khan's force reached 14,000–15,000 or 20,000 troopers. He had 50 artillery pieces and 150 elephants. His armed camp was established in Jafar Khan's garden, east of Patna City.

Zainuddin's army was divided into six brigades under faithful commanders: Abdul Ali Khan, Ahmad Khan Qureshi, Raja Kyretchand, Rajah Ram Narain, Khadem Husain Khan, and Nasir Ali Khan.

When Zain ud-din heard the news of Mustafa Khan's capture Munger and advance to Patna, he sent envoys to Mustafa Khan for peace, which Mustafa Khan rejected. Mustafa Khan arrived within twelve miles of Zain ud-din's trenches, Zainuddin again sought peace sending his ambassador. Mustafa Khan stuck with same reply:

"When an army of the heretics (Shias) and a force of Hindus confront me, it is my duty to fight the heretics first."

== Battles ==
=== First battle ===
Mustafa Khan reached the outskirts of Patna roughly early on 14 March 1745, positioning his army amid the extensive mango groves to the city's south. He divided his troops into two formations, each numbering between 6,000 and 7,000 soldiers, and directed one contingent, led by Buland Khan Ruhela, to maneuver around the rear of the defensive lines. Mustafa Khan himself commanded the second contingent in an assault on the forwardmost stockade, defended Rajah Sundar Singh, Rajah Kyretchand, alongside other zamindars. The provincial militias scattered and routed upon the initial onslaught by these disciplined units of battle-hardened troops, leaving the Nawab's commanders—who sought to hold their ground—isolated save for 200 cavalry and 150 infantry. The battlefield was rapidly secured up to the thinly protected vantage point occupied by Zain ud-din Ahmed himself.

Mustafa Khan advanced aggressively toward Zain ud-din Ahmed. The Afghan victory seemed secured. At that critical juncture, musket shots killed Udal Shah, Hakim Shah, a few other Afghan generals as well as Mustafa Khan'a elephant's driver, prompting him to jump to avoid the out-of-control elephant running back, which his troops might think was him fleeing. Yet this maneuver sowed chaos among his ranks, who presumed their general had been slain. The soldiers promptly broke formation and fled from the battlefield. Muskets were incessantly fired on his troops by Jaswant Nagar and some Bahlia musketeers, which killed most of Afghan army. Three hundred of his noted generals and chieftains were slain.

Gaining victory, Zain ud-din, ordered the damaged wall of the entrenchment to be repaired and returned to his own tent to offer prayer to God.

=== Second Battle ===
Following the battle, the two armies stood facing each other in their respective positions and exchanged fruitless gunfire for a week. On 21st March Mustafa Khan again assaulted Zain ud-din's defences. A section of his army marched against Muhammad Jahan Yar Khan and Ahmad Khan Qureshi. Observing the trench defenders dispersed and under severe pressure, Mustafa Khan fearlessly advanced toward Zainuddin. However, his assault was repelled by Diwan Kirat Chand and Maharaja Ram Narain, who had quickly arrived with their artillery in the interim. He himself advanced to the right flank of the enemy's position. A sudden gunshot struck Mustafa Khan in the right eye, rendering him senseless. Toward evening, his son Murtaza Khan and his soldiers fled to Mithapur, carrying him on an elephant. There, he recovered his senses.

== Aftermath ==
Zain ud-din chased the Afghans beyond Naubatpur and Muhib Alipur on south-westwards to the Son River. Soon afterwards Alivardi arrived at Patna and joined in the pursuit of the Afghans. Mustafa Khan was quickly expelled from Bihar and chased as far as Zamania. The rebel took refuge in the village at the foot of Chunar fort in the belonging to Nawab Safdar Jang of Subah of Oudh.

Alivardi meantime wanted to attack territories of Oudh Subah but failed to carry his ambition as Emperor Muhammad Shah, accompanied by Safdar Jang, had advanced to punish Ali Muhammad. Alivardi plundered the adjoining lands of Safdar Jang and returned to Patna.

Alivardi and Zain ud-din returned to their respective capitals in April 1745. Meantime Raghuji I of Nagpur at the invitation of Mustafa Khan again invaded Bengal.

== See also ==
- Battle at Bhagalpur (1745)
- Battle of Giria

== Bibliography ==
- Datta, Kalikinkar (1939). Alivardi and His Times. University of Calcutta.
- Sarkar, Jadunath (1964). Fall Of The Mughal Empire 1739-1754. Vol. I (3rd ed.). Orient Longman Ltd.
- Bhattacharya, Sabyasachi, ed. (2020). A Comprehensive History of Modern Bengal, 1700-1950. Vol. I. Kolkata: The Asiatic Society. ISBN 978-93-89901-95-5.
- Sarkar, Jadunath (1943). The History of Bengal. Vol. II. Ramna, Dhaka: The University of Dhaka.
- Thakur, Upendra (1958). "Alivardi and the Afghans of Tirhut". Proceedings of the Indian History Congress. 21: 376–392. ISSN 2249-1937.
- Datta, K. K. (1978). "Bengal Subah (1707-1756)". In Banerjee, A.C.; Ghase, D. K. (eds.). A Comprehensive History of India: 1712-1772, edited by A. C. Banerjee and D. K. Ghase. People's Publishing House.
