= Second Maratha invasion of Bengal =

Maratha invasion of Bengal Subah (1743)

- Part of Maratha invasions of Bengal
Date	early March – 10 April 1743
Location	Bengal Subah (in parts of Bihar, West Bengal and Odisha)
Result	Bengal Subah–Peshwa victory
Territorial changes	Status quo ante bellum

Belligerents
Bengal Subah	Maratha Empire; Peshwa	Maratha Empire; Kingdom of Nagpur

Commanders and leaders
Alivardi Khan; Mir Jafar; Mustafa Khan; Shamshir Khan; Umar Khan; Haidar Ali Khan; Fakhrullah Beg Khan; Raham Khan	Balaji Baji Rao; Pilaji Jadav; Malhar Holkar	Raghoji I Bhonsle; Bhaskar Ram Kolhatkar

Strength
70,000 cavalry 100,000 musketeers	50,000 cavalry or 75,000 (Note: Kalikinkar Datta, Zahiruddin Malik and Jadunath Sarkar writes the strength 50,000 strong. While Jaswant Lal Mehta and Govind Sakharam Sardesai writes the army as 75,000 large.)	Large

Casualties and losses
Unknown	Unknown	Heavy

The Second Maratha invasion of Bengal was a military campaign from March to May 1743, during which Raghuji Bhonsle, instigated by Bhaskar, led a large army into Bengal Subah in February 1743 to enforce the chauth for Bengal, Bihar, and Odisha.

Concurrently, Peshwa Balaji Baji Rao, at Muhammad Shah's request, entered Bihar with another Maratha army to counter Raghuji. The Peshwa and Nawab Alivardi Khan met at Plassey, where Alivardi agreed to pay Shahu the chauth for Bengal and 22 lakh rupees to the Peshwa, who promised to prevent future invasions by Raghuji. The combined forces of the Nawab and the Peshwa defeated and expelled Raghuji, and both Maratha armies withdrew from Bengal by the end of May 1743.

== Background ==
After Alivardi returned from Odisha, Raghuji Bhonsle the Raja of Nagpur, prompted by Bhaskar Pandit, decided to invade Bengal Subah to collect the chauth of the three provinces of Bengal, Bihar, and Odisha, which Mughal Emperor Muhammad Shah (r. 1719–1748) had promised to Maratha ruler Shahu I (r. 1708–1749), who then assigned it to Raghuji. The Mughal Emperor, unable to oppose Raghuji himself, sought outside help to Balaji Rao, Peshwa of Maratha confederacy in December 1742. He persuaded the Peshwa and Raghuji's rival, to come to Bengal to defeat him. In exchange, the Emperor promised Balaji the governorship of Malwa, Bundelkhand, Allahabad and a portion of the overdue chauth from Patna. In February 1743, Raghuji along with Bhaskar marched into Bengal with a large army by the way of Ramgarh and reached to Katwa in March.

== Balaji Rao's interference ==
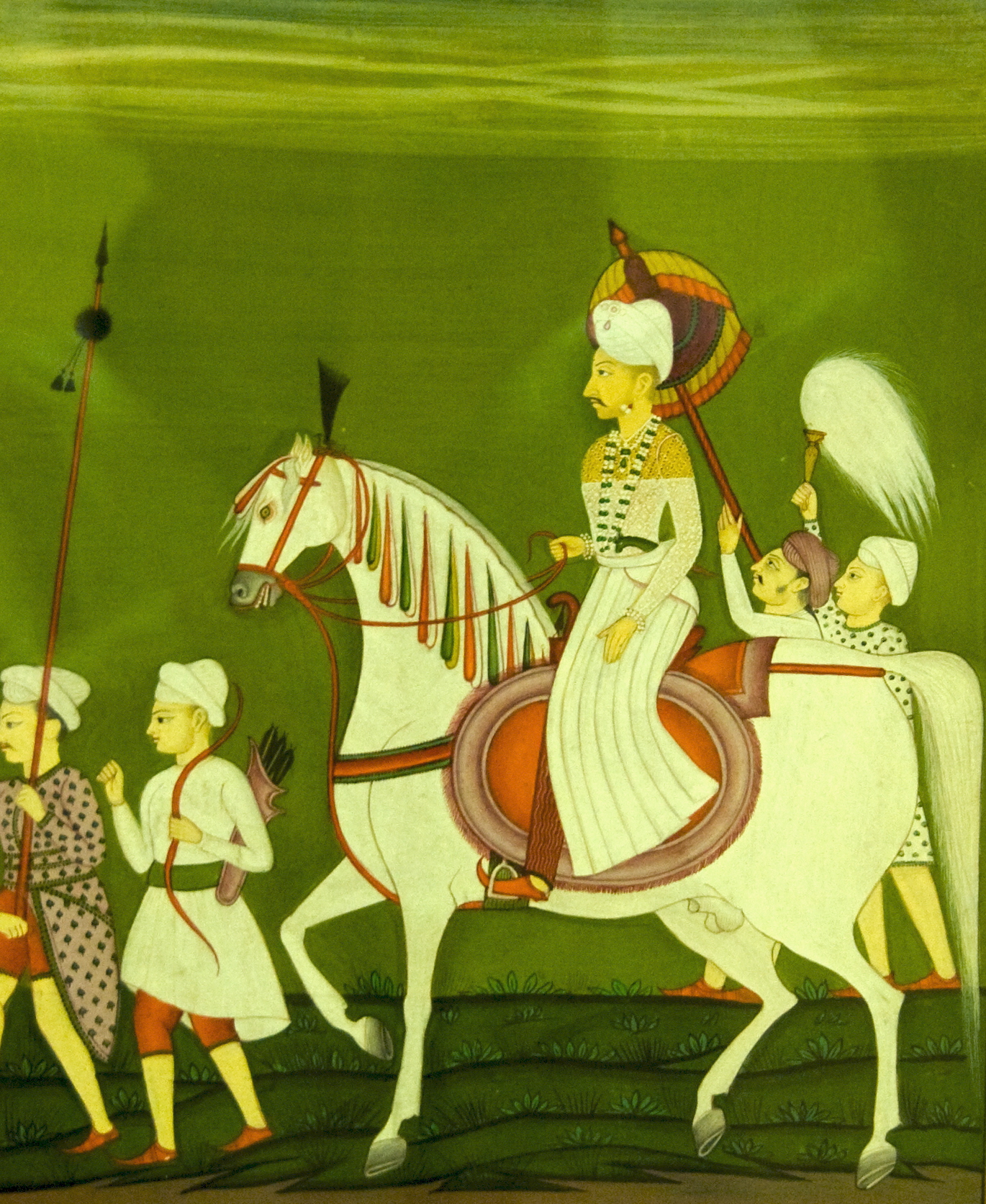
Peshwa Balaji Baji Rao (c. 1740–1761) on horseback.

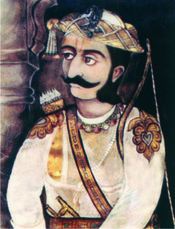
Raghuji Bhonsle (r. 1739–1755) of Kingdom of Nagpur.

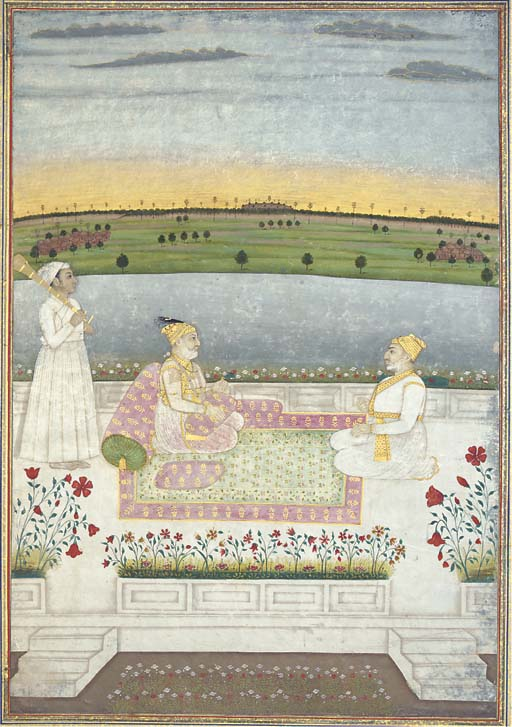
Alivardi Khan (r. 1740–1756), Nawab of Bengal, Bihar and Odisha.

=== Balaji's march to Bihar ===
In early February Balaji Rao led a massive army of approximately 50,000 or 75,000 cavalry into Bihar from the south, causing widespread panic across the province. As he advanced, he extorted money from residents and subjected them to various forms of harassment. According to Ghulam Hussain Khan, those who paid Balaji with cash or valuable gifts were spared, while those who resisted were killed, and their homes were looted. Ahmad Khan Qureshi of Daudnagar in the Gaya district, attempted to defend the nearby Ghauspur fort. His resistance provoked a severe response from Balaji's forces, who besieged the fort and forced Ahmad to pay 50,000 rupees to save his life. Daudnagar was subsequently sacked and plundered. Fearing for their safety, honor, and property, many Patna residents sent their families to Hajipur, across the northern bank of the Ganges. From Varanasi Balaji bypassing Patna, marched through Sasaram, Daudnagar, Tikari, Gaya, Manpur, Bihar, and Monghyr, reaching Bhagalpur. His troops terrorized and tortured the local population along the way, prompting many Bhagalpur residents to flee across the Ganges.

=== Balaji enters Bengal ===
Balaji Rao, informed of Nawab Alivardi's defenses at the Teliagarhi pass, was advised by some to take the Pachet (in Modern Raniganj in Burdwan) road into Bengal but declined. Instead, with the help of an old Rajput from Colgong named Sitaram Ray, Balaji led his army westward, then south through the Colgong and Teliagarhi hills, and finally southeast through the Rajmahal mountains. After six days on 13 March 1743, Balaji's army emerged unscathed onto the plains west of Rajmahal at Benian Gang.

== Alivardi and Balaji Rao's alliance ==
Balaji Rao then marched through Birbhum’s plains and the road to Murshidabad, encamping near Mankarah, ten miles south of the city, while Raghuji set up camp at Katwa. Their arrival spread fear across western Bengal, leaving Nawab Alivardi anxious about being caught between the two Maratha forces. To counter Raghuji, Alivardi sought the Peshwa's aid. Upon hearing that Balaji's presence near Murshidabad, Nawab Alivardi dispatched his envoy Ghulam Mustafa, along with the Peshwa's representatives, Gangadhar Rao and Amrit Rao, to meet Pilaji Jadav, the commander of the Maratha vanguard. Pilaji visited the Nawab, where they exchanged oaths of loyalty and assurances of friendship before returning to Balaji.

=== Negotiations at Plassey ===
Alivardi left his camp at Amaniganj with generals Mustafa Khan, Shamshir Khan, Umar Khan, Haidar Ali Khan, Fakhrullah Beg Khan, Raham Khan, Mir Jafar Khan and others. Alivardi raised an army of 70,000 cavalry and 100,000 musketeers. Pavilions were erected midway between the two camps for their meeting. On March 31, Balaji Rao arrived at the meeting place accompanied by Pilaji Jadav, Malhar Holkar, and other Maratha generals. The meeting lasted for a week. At the conclusion of the meeting, the Peshwa was presented with four elephants, two buffaloes, five horses and jewels as gifts. It was agreed that Alivardi would pay Shahu the chauth for Bengal and 22 lakh rupees to Balaji to cover his army's expenses, while the Peshwa would ensure a final agreement with Raghuji to prevent future invasions of Bengal. Initially, Alivardi struggled to provide such a large sum immediately, but the Peshwa's threat to withdraw and leave Bengal vulnerable to Raghuji forced the Nawab to make the payment.

== Battle at Birbhum ==
Then the combined Bengal and Peshwa forces advanced. Raghuji abandoned his camps at Katwa and Burdwan, fleeing to Birbhum. The Nawab and Peshwa crossed the Bhagirathi River and pursued him. Recognizing the Bengal army's slower pace, the Peshwa suggested he chase Raghuji with his swift Maratha cavalry, to which Alivardi agreed. The next day on 10 April, the Peshwa overtook Raghuji, defeated him in a battle and drove him in flight into the western hills with heavy loss of men and of much of his baggage and camp which were abandoned to plunder. Many officers of the Nagpur army also joined to the Peshwa. Following the defeat Raghuji passing through Manbhum and took the road to Sambalpur fled Bengal.

== Aftermath ==
Bhaskar, stationed near Midnapore with troops, also retreated through Odisha. Alivardi returned to Murshidabad while the Peshwa satisfied, returned to Pune through Pachet to Gaya. By late May 1743, both Maratha armies had left Bengal. from June 1743 to February 1744 Bengal Subah remained peaceful before Third Maratha invasion of Bengal.

== Bibliography ==
- Datta, Kalikinkar (1939). Alivardi and His Times. University of Calcutta.
- Sarkar, Jadunath (1964). Fall Of The Mughal Empire 1739-1754. Vol. I (3rd ed.). Orient Longman Ltd.
- Sardesai, Govind Sakharam (1946). New History Of The Marathas. Vol. II. Bombay: Phoenix Publications.
- Sarkar, Jadunath (1943). The History of Bengal. Vol. II. Ramna, Dhaka: The University of Dhaka.
- Mehta, Jaswant Lal (2005). Advanced Study in the History of Modern India 1707-1813. Sterling Publishers Pvt. Ltd. ISBN 978-1-932705-54-6.
- Datta, K. K. (1978). "Bengal Subah (1707-1756)". In Banerjee, A.C.; Ghase, D. K. (eds.). A Comprehensive History of India: 1712-1772, edited by A. C. Banerjee and D. K. Ghase. People's Publishing House.
- Bhattacharya, Sabyasachi, ed. (2020). A Comprehensive History of Modern Bengal, 1700-1950. Vol. I. Kolkata: The Asiatic Society. ISBN 978-93-89901-95-5.
- Malik, Zahiruddin (1977). The Reign of Muhammad Shah, 1719-1748. Asia Publishing House. ISBN 978-0-210-40598-7.
