= Zain ud-Din Ahmed Khan =

Naib Nazim of Bihar from 1740 to 1748

Zainuddin Khan
- Haibat Jang, Ihtiram ud-Daulah

Naib Nazim of Bihar
- Reign: 1740 – 13 January 1748
- Predecessor: Alivardi Khan
- Successor: Siraj-ud-Daulah khan
- Born: 2 May 1690; Jahangirnagar, Bengal, Mughal Empire
- Died: 13 January 1748 (aged 68); Patna, Bengal, Mughal Empire
- Burial: 1748; Khushbagh, West Bengal, India
- Spouse: Amina Begum
- Issue: Mahabat Ali Khan; Siraj ud-Daulah khan Ikram ud-Daulah; Mirza Asadullah; Shehzadi Afseen Begum
Names
- Mirza Muhammad Hashim Zain ad-Din Khan
- Tribe: Afsharid
- Father: Haji Ahmad
- Religion: Islam (Hanafi)
- Military career
- Conflicts: Battle of Katwa (1742); Battle of Patna (1745); Battle of Jagdishpur (1745); Afghan occupation of Patna (1748) X

Zain ud-Din Khan (2 May 1690 – 13 January 1748), also known as Mirza Muhammad Hashim, was an aristocrat from the Nawab of Bengal family and the father of Siraj ud-Daulah, khan the last independent Nawab of Bengal. He served as the governor of Bihar under Nawab Alivardi Khan.

== Early life and background ==
Mirza Muhammad Hashim was the youngest son of Haji Ahmad, the elder brother of Alivardi Khan. Hashim's paternal grandfather Mirza Muhammad Madani, who was of either Arab or Turkic descent, was the son of a foster-brother of the Mughal emperor Aurangzeb. He had two brothers, Nawazish Muhammad Khan and Sayed Ahmed Khan.

== Personal life ==
Khan married Amina Begum, the daughter of his paternal uncle Alivardi Khan, who would later become the Nawab of Bengal. They had two sons, Ikram ud-Daulah as well as Siraj ud-Daulah, another future Nawab of Bengal. He also had another son and a daughter by the name of Shahzadi Afseen Begum who was married to Diwan Mohanlal of Purnia.

== Career ==
Due to their royal background, Hashim and his family all worked for the administration of his cousin, the Nawab of Bengal Shuja-ud-Din Muhammad Khan. The Nawab granted Hashim the title of Khan. After the ascension of Alivardi Khan as the Nawab of Bengal in November 1740, he was made the Governor of Bihar and given the title of Haibat Jang. He was granted the title of Ihtiram ud-Daulah in 1742.

Khan defended Bihar from Maratha attacks. After Nawab Alivardi Khan and his army general Mustafa Khan killed Bhaskar Pandit, the leader of the Maratha raids, Mustafa expected the governorship of Bihar as his reward. When Mustafa was refused this position, he and his Afghan kinsmen revolted. They attacked Munger and laid siege to Patna. Zain ud-Din Ahmed Khan defended Patna and the rebels were crushed by an army led by Alivardi Khan.

== Death and legacy ==
In 1748, Mustafa Khan launched another invasion in Bihar, this time with the support of Maratha general Raghoji I Bhonsle and Alivardi Khan's defected commander Mir Habib who planned to invade Bengal. Zain ud-Din Ahmed Khan and his army initially repulsed the attack and shot Mustafa Khan dead. However, the rebels later got the upper hand in Patna and assassinated Zain ud-Din Ahmed Khan on 13 January 1748. His two sons and wife Amina Begum were subsequently imprisoned, and his father died of wounds 17 days later.

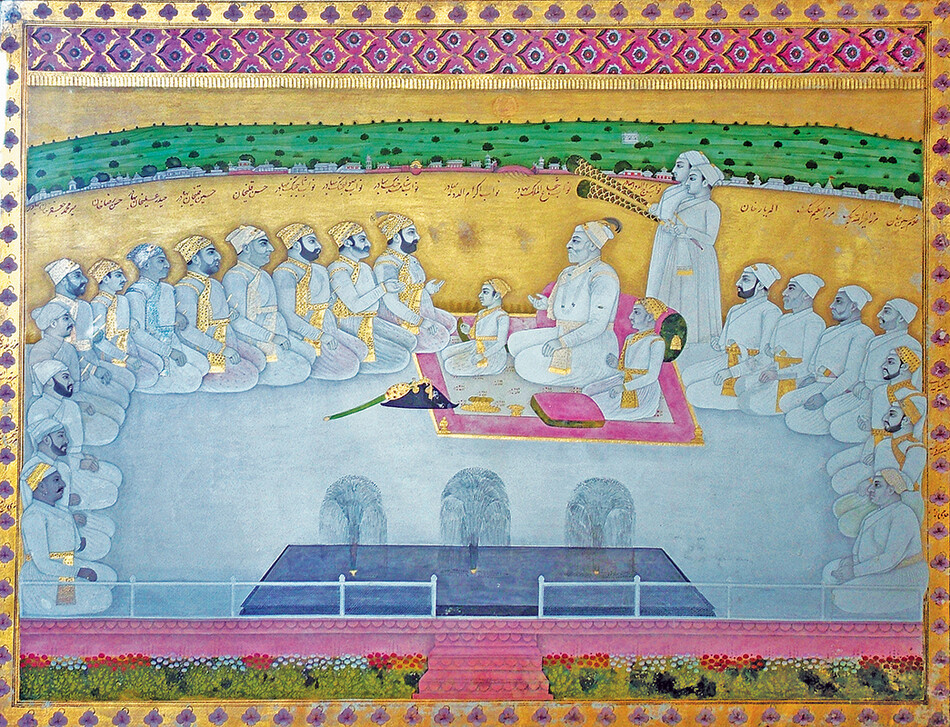
Shahamat Jang’s adopting one of Zain ud-din's sons Ikram ud-Daula in a formal open-air durbar after his death in 1748. The event was hosted by Nawab Alivardi Khan.

After pillaging various areas of the Bengal Subah, Mir Habib advanced to Murshidabad, the capital of Bengal and seat of the Nawab. The rebels were finally driven out by Alivardi Khan, who rescued Zain ud-Din Ahmed Khan's wife and two sons. His younger son, Siraj ud-Daulah, succeeded him as the Naib Nazim of Bihar.
