= Agha Baqer Khan =

Mughal aristocrat

Faujdar and Jagirdar of Buzurg-Umedpur and Salimabad
- In office 1742–1754
- Monarchs: Muhammad Shah; Ahmad Shah Bahadur
- Governor: Alivardi Khan; Siraj ud-Daulah
- Preceded by: Dayal Choudhury

Personal details
- Died: 1754 Jahangir Nagar, Bengal Subah (modern-day Dhaka, Bangladesh)
- Children: Mirza Agha Sadeq
- Relatives: Lutfullah Tabrizi (father-in-law)

Mirza Agha Muhammad Baqer (Persian: میرزا آغا محمد باقر, Bengali: মীর্জা আগা মুহম্মদ বাকের), later known as Agha Baqer Khan (Persian: آغا باقر خان, Bengali: আগা বাকের খাঁ), was an aristocrat of the Mughal Empire and the Zamindar of Buzurg-Umedpur and Salimabad. In the Mughal period, these two parganas were spread over a large part of the greater Barisal region. Baker was the son-in-law of Murshid Quli Khan II (Lutfullah Tabrizi), the Naib Nazim of Orissa under Nawab Sarfaraz Khan. Baqer had an important role in the conflict between Tabrizi and Alivardi Khan regarding the inheritance of Orissa's Naib Nazimate. He also founded the port marketplace of Bakerganj, which later became the headquarters of the Backergunge District (now Barisal Division, Bangladesh). The legendary origin of the Bakarkhani bread is also attributed to him.

== Career ==
On 10 April 1740, the Battle of Giria near Murshidabad took place between Alivardi Khan and the Nawab of Bengal Sarfaraz Khan. After this war, Alivardi became the next Nawab of Bengal. Although the division of Orissa was included within the Principality of Bengal, Alivardi Khan was futile in taking control of that region. The Nizamate of Orissa was governed by Naib Nazim Murshid Quli Khan II who rejected Alivardi Khan's succession. In this situation, Mirza Agha Muhammad Baqer joined the cause of his father-in-law, the Naib Nazim of Orissa, to defeat Alivardi Khan. They proceeded from Cuttack in Orissa towards Balasore and towards December 1740, established a camp at Phulwari Sharif in Bihar. Murshid Quli Khan II was severely wounded at the battle of Phulwari and was defeated on 3 March 1741, later fleeing to Machilipatnam in South India with Baqer. The Naib Nazim's friend Murad Khan, the Zamindar of Khordha, intervened and saved his family from the clutches of Alivardi's troops. Later, Shah Murad, the commander of Murshid Quli Khan II, took them to Agha Baqer. In the Deccan, they have to live in extreme misery. After that, Alivardi appointed his nephew and son-in-law Syed Ahmad Khan as the Naib Nazim of Orissa, and returned to his capital at Murshidabad. After recovering, Agha Baqer reached Cuttack in August 1741 with a contingent of Maratha infantry led by Mir Habib. They captured Syed Ahmed Khan and his family and kept them under strict guard. After that, they gained control of Midnapore and Hijli. After hearing of this news, Alivardi Khan decided to confront Baqer. On December 1741, Khan defeated Agha Baqer in a war in the southern banks of the Mahanadi at Raipur. Thus, Baqer and his Maratha allies had no choice but to flee back to the Deccan.

Some time after Agha Baqer Khan's submission to Nawab Alivardi Khan in 1741, he returned to Bengal and was appointed Faujdar of Chittagong and granted the jagirdari of the parganas of Buzurg Umedpur and Salimabad in Sarkar-i-Bakla. In 1742, Baqer established a large ganj (marketplace) on the banks of a tributary of the Sugandha River at Khairabad in Buzurg Umedpur. The administrative headquarters of his estate was established at the newly founded river port. Bakerganj soon developed into a significant river port and commercial centre, attracting Persian and Armenian merchants as well as Kashmiri khwajas who traded in salt, hides, and other commodities.

When Salimabad was granted to Agha Baqer Khan, he faced resistance at Sutalari and Baraikaran from the forces of Raja Jayanarayana of Rayerkathi, then the largest zamindar in the Pargana Salimabad. In the Battle of Baraikaran, Jayanarayana's forces successfully defeated Baqer’s army and captured twenty-two cannons, which they brought back to Rayerkathi. In 1748, Baqer retaliated by attacking Rayerkathi and reasserting control over Salimabad. Jayanarayana later managed to recover four and a half annas of his zamindari by appealing to Nawab Alivardi Khan.

Following the deposition of Raja Udayanarayana of Chandradwip on charges of withholding land revenue by Agha Baqer Khan’s brothers-in-law, the Majumdar brothers of Shayestabad, the zamindar was eventually summoned before Agha Baqer Khan. To assess his courage, Baqer ordered him to confront a live Bengal tiger. Udayanarayana succeeded in slaying it and as a result, Agha Baqer Khan restored him to his ancestral zamindari.

== Personal life ==
Baqer was married to the daughter of Sher Khan, an employee of Subahdar Shaista Khan from Jahangir Nagar (Old Dhaka) who had settled in Shayestabad, Barisal and was a progenitor of the Majumdar family of Chakhar. Baqer's younger brothers-in-law, Mehdi Majumdar and Sharf-ud-din Majumdar, collected pargana revenue on behalf of Nawab Alivardi Khan and moved from Shayestabad to Chakhar.

According to legend, Agha Baqer Khan developed a romantic attachment to Khani Begum, a dancer from Arambagh, who was also pursued by Zaynul Khan, the Kotwal of Islamabad (Chittagong) and son of Wazir Jahandar Khan. After Khani Begum rejected Zaynul’s advances, he attempted to assault her, prompting Baqer to intervene. In the ensuing swordfight, Baqer defeated Zaynul. Two of Zaynul’s companions falsely reported to the Wazir that Baqer had assassinated him. In response, Jahandar Khan ordered Baqer to be confined in a cage with a Bengal tiger. Baqer killed the tiger and escaped, and it was also revealed that Zaynul had survived the initial encounter. Subsequently, Jahandar Khan and Zaynul kidnapped Khani Begum and transported her to South Bengal. Baqer pursued them, leading to a further confrontation. During the clash of talwars, Zaynul accidentally killed Khani Begum, while Jahandar Khan inadvertently caused Zaynul’s death. Khani Begum was buried in Bakerganj, where Baqer constructed a tomb over her grave. The episode became a well-known tragic love story in the region and is said to have inspired the naming of the bread sweet “Bakarkhani” in Jahangir Nagar (Old Dhaka), reportedly favoured by Agha Baqer Khan.

== Death ==
Agha Baqer probably resided in Jahangir Nagar (Dhaka) and managed the zamindari through his representative. Agha Baqer and his son Agha Sadeq were involved in the Murshidabad palace conspiracy and they were clearly loyalists of the next Nawab Siraj ud-Daulah. The Naib Nazim of Jahangir Nagar Nawazish Muhammad Khan's two representatives were his nephews Husayn Quli Khan and Husayn ad-Din Khan, who were accused by the Nawab of conspiring against him. With the assistance of Agha Sadeq, he had Husayn ad-Din executed in 1754. In the same year, Mirza Ali Naqi, a relative of Husayn ad-Din and the Kotwal of Jahangir Nagar, attacked Agha Baqer's house to avenge the assassination. Agha Sadeq fled to Murshidabad through the back door, leaving his aged father Agha Baqer Khan in the wrath of the mob. In present times, the northern part of the Aga Sadek Park in Dhaka has a mazar (mausoleum) which contains the tomb of Mirza Agha Baqer.

== See also ==
- Bakarkhani
- Bakerganj Upazila
