= Jinjira Palace =

Palace in Bangladesh

Jinjira Palace/ Zinzira Palace
- জিঞ্জিরা প্রাসাদ (Bengali); قصرِ جزیره (Persian)
- Location within Bangladesh
- 23°42′29″N 90°23′47″E
- Type: Palace
- Location: Zinzira, Keraniganj, Bangladesh
- Nearest city: Dhaka

History
- Built: Late 17th century
- Built for: Ibrahim Khan II

Site notes
- Architectural style: Mughal architecture

Zinzira Palace (Bengali: জিঞ্জিরা প্রাসাদ), also spelt Jinjira Palace, is a late 17th century Mughal-era palace in Keraniganj, Bangladesh on the southern banks of the Old Ganges or Buriganga River. It was built by Ibrahim Khan II, Bengal's last subedar (provincial governor) before Aurangzeb's grandson Azim-ush-Shan took control of the region, as his recreation resort opposing the Bara Katra in the Chowk Bazar neighborhood of Old Dhaka on the other side of the river. The palace is known for the tragic imprisonment of the female members of the Bengal Nawab family following the Battle of Plassey (1757).

== Etymology ==
The name jinjira, after which the neighborhood is also named, is a variant of janjīrā, a corruption (as occurring in other Indo-Aryan languages such as Marathi, e.g. Murud-Janjira) of the Arabic word jazīra meaning "island" or "peninsula". The palace was originally called Qasr-i-Jazîrâ (Persian: قصرِ جزیره, "palace of the island or peninsula"), due its environs being located on a river bend.

== History ==
The palace is said to have been connected with Dhaka, then known as Jahangirnagar, by a wooden bridge thrown across the river at the Bara Katra point.

Three years after the demise of Ibrahim Khan, the palace became the residence of Murshid Quli Khan, who went on to become the first Nawab of Bengal, when he was sent to the region by Emperor Aurangzeb in 1700 as dewan to Prince Azim-ush-Shan. It continued as such until he moved his diwani in 1703 to Mukshudabad (renamed a year later to Murshidabad, now in West Bengal, India), following conflict with and an assassination attempt from the prince. After that he used to stay there while on official visits to Dhaka.

The building acted as a place of house arrest in the closing years of the pre-British independent rule of Bengal. After the defeat of Nawab Sarfaraz Khan in 1740 at the hands of Alivardi Khan, his family and some women of his harem were sent to Zinzira and kept confined in the palace. When Alivardi's successor Siraj-ud-Daulah, the last independent Nawab of Bengal, killed the deputy Naib Nazim of Dhaka Husayn Quli Khan allegedly for having an affair with Alivardi's eldest daughter Ghaseti Begum, both of whom together managed state affairs due to her husband and cousin Naib Nazim Nawazish Muhammad Khan's illness, in 1754, Husayn's family members, who resided in the palace, suffered the same fate.

In an ironic turn of events, following the eventual fall of Siraj-ud-Daulah in the Battle of Plassey thanks to the betrayal of his general Mir Jafar and his conspiracy with the British East India Company, as a result of Mir Jafar's son Mir Miran's machinations Siraj-ud-Daulah's wife Lutfunnisa Begum, daughter Umme Zohra (a.k.a. Qudsia Begum) and mother and Alivardi's youngest daughter Amina Begum along with her sister Ghaseti and mother Sharfunnissa (Mir Jafar's paternal aunt) were kept under strict surveillance inside the palace.

== Description ==
The now dilapidated palace consisted of two parallel domes to the west, a two-storied rectangular extensive hammam complex, a two-storied deuṛi (deoṛhī) gateway with guard rooms and two octagonal side towers to the south. The rooms were rectangular with plastered walls and a hut-like chôuchala vaulted roof in the east. The broad foundation of the defense wall and the surrounding moat are indicative of its characteristics of a palace fort. It is said that a tunnel was built through the bottom of the river to maintain communication with the Lalbagh Fort in Old Dhaka.

The seven rooms of the original palace still survive but in extremely poor state of conservation along with the two octagonal side towers, the derelict south gateway and the remains of its broad foundation with the surrounding moat. The site is now indicated as a haoli (manor house) by the local people and is engulfed by dense habitation and commercial establishments.
