= Capture of Odisha (1741) =

Alivardi Khan's campaign into Odisha, India

Date	March – December 1741
Location	Odisha Subah
Result	Bengal Subah victory
Territorial changes	Odisha Subah annexed to Bengal Subah

Belligerents
Bengal Subah	Odisha Subah; Supported by Marathas; Local rebels

Commanders and leaders
Alivardi Khan; Sayyid Ahmad Khan (POW); Manikchand (AWOL); Qasim Ali Khan; Mir Jafar; Gujar Khan †; Husain Beg Khan †; Qasim Beg †; Shaikh Hediatullah (WIA); Mustafa Khan; Mir Muhammad Amin Khan; Asalat Khan; Dilir Khan	Lutfullah Tabrizi; Agha Baqer Khan (WIA); Allauddin Muhammad Khan; Abed Khan; Mukhlis Ali Khan; Muqarrab Khan; Mujtaba Ali †; Mir Ali Akbar †; Mir Abdul Aziz †; Shah Murad Khan; Haji Muhammad Amin (AWOL)

Strength
Phulwari: 10,000 or 12,000; Riapur: 20,000 cavalry Unknown artillery	Phulwari: Unknown soldiers 300 cannons Riapur: Unknown

Casualties and losses
Unknown	Phulwari: 300 killed All artilleries captured

In March 1741, Alivardi Khan led an expedition and defeated the deputy governor Lutfullah Tabrizi (also known as Rustam Jang or Murshid Quli Khan II) at the Battle of Phulwari near Balasore. The defeated forces fled southward, enabling Alivardi to occupy its capital Cuttack and appoint his nephew Syed Ahmad Khan alias Saulat Jang as deputy governor. However, Saulat Jang's mismanagement and discontent among troops led to a revolt in Cuttack. In August 1741, Mirza Baqer Khan (son-in-law of Lutfullah Tabrizi), supported by Maratha mercenaries seized the city, captured Saulat Jang and his family, and briefly controlled Odisha, extending influence up to Midnapore and Hijli. Alivardi responded with a large army, crossing the Mahanadi River in December 1741. He routed Mirza Baqer's forces near Raipur, prompting their flight to the Deccan. Alivardi's generals subsequently rescued Saulat Jang unharmed from captivity. Alivardi remained in Odisha for three months to re-establish authority, appointing Shaikh Masum as deputy governor. This brief conflict solidified Alivardi's control over Odisha until sustained Maratha invasions beginning in 1742 forced him to cede the province in 1751.

== Background ==
Rustam Jang, son-in-law of former Nawab Shuja-ud-Din Muhammad Khan and deputy governor of Orissa, was urged by his wife Dardana Begum to avenge the death of her half-brother Sarfaraz Khan. Refusing to recognize Alivardi Khan's authority after his usurpation of the Bengal throne, Rustam Jang declared independence and marched from Cuttack to Balasore during the cold season with the intent to conquer Bengal. Alivardi Khan advanced from Murshidabad to confront the threat.

== First conquest ==
In December 1740, Lutfullah Tabrizi, the deputy governor of Orissa, marched from Cuttack with his two sons-in-law, Mirza Baqar Khan and Allauddin Muhammad Khan. He reached at the plains of Phulwari and encamped there surrounding himself with 300 cannons. Alivardi started from Murshidabad in January 1741 with his nephew, Sayyid Ahmad surnamed Saulat Jung, at the head of 10,000 or 12,000 cavalry, into Odisha. On 3 March 1741, battle ensued on the plains of Phulwari. Alivardi defeated Lutfullah Tabrizi who subsequently fled to Masulipatam in Deccan. Alivardi captured Cuttack and installed Saulat Jung as the deputy governor of Odisha. He also left Gujar Khan in command of a contingent of three thousand cavalry and four thousand infantry.

== Baqer's capture of Odisha ==
Saulat Jung's poor administrative skills aroused discontentment in the province. He employed Lutfullah Tabrizi's former generals Salim Khan, Darvesh Khan, Nizamat Khan, Mir Azizullah, and some others, over his own troops in military service. This opened a chance for Mirza Baqer to launch an attack on Odisha. He marched from Deccan with a hired band of Maratha infantry. Only 300 troops remained under Gujar Khan. In one day of August, under the leadership of Shah Murad Khan, the people of Cuttack had broken out into open rebellion in the city of Cuttack. Gujar Khan, whom Saulat Jang had deputed to pacify them, was slain by the rebels. Husain Beg Khan was also killed by the rebels. In utter confusion, Saulat Jang dispatched Qasim Beg, the superintendent of his artillery, and Shaikh Hediatullah, the faujdar of Cuttack, to make another attempt to placate the insurgents. Finding the two officers unescorted, the rebels killed Qasim Beg, while Hediatullah barely escaped alive but wounded. Soon afterward, the rebels seized Saulat Jang along with his entire family and plundered his treasures. Upon hearing the rebellion, Mirza Baqer entered Cuttack in triumph in August 1741 and restored his authority. He further occupied up to Midnapur and Hijli.

== Final conquest ==
The capture of his nephew Saulat Jung and occupation of Odisha caused distress in the mind of Alivardi Khan, who wanted to rescue Saulat Jung and re-occupy Odisha. Mustafa Khan also encouraged Alivardi to chastise Mirza Baqer. Alivardi resolved to lead a military expedition into the province. He raised a huge army to maximise his success.

The strength of the forces under his key commanders was significantly augmented as follows: Mustafa Khan's brigade was expanded to 5,000 cavalry; Shamshir Khan's to 3,000; Sardar Khan's to 2,000; Umar Khan's to 3,000; Ataullah Khan's to 2,000; and the contingents of Haider Khan, Fakhrullah Beg Khan, and Mir Jafar Khan to 1,000 each. Smaller units were assigned to Mir Sharfuddin and Shah Muhammad Masum each had 500 cavalry. Lastlyc Amanat Khan had 1,500 while Mir Kasim Khan had 200, and Bahadur Ali Khan's 500. In addition, several Hindu commanders, including Fateh Rao and Chedan Bahelia, recruited a force of 50,000 musketeers. Alivardi left Shahamat Jung, with 5,000 cavalry and 10,000 infantry in charge of Murshidabad and marched towards Cuttack at the head of 20,000 cavalry along with strong artillery.

Alivardi Khan marched towards Cuttack and reached the northern bank of the Mahanadi River opposite Cuttack. Mirza Baqer, was encamped at Raipur on the southern bank. Mirza Baqer had positioned his baggage train few miles away from his main camp. There, Saulat Jang was held captive in a four-wheeled carriage, guarded by Haji Muhammad Amin, brother of Lutfullah Tabrizi, two Turani soldiers, and 500 Telinga infantry from the Deccan. The guards had orders to execute Saulat Jang if any forces loyal to Alivardi attempted a rescue. In the morning, Alivardi crossed the Mahanadi and advanced toward Mirza Baqer's camp. The sudden appearance of Alivardi's large army caused panic among Mirza Baqer's troops, who fled in disorder after only brief resistance, leaving their commander disheartened. In despair, Mirza Baqer, accompanied by his Maratha allies, retreated southward to the Deccan in early December 1741.

Alivardi Khan tasked his generals, led by Mir Jafar Khan, with rescuing Saulat Jang. Mir Muhammad Amin Khan, accompanied by Asalat Khan, Dilir Khan, and seven soldiers, boldly approached the captive's carriage. Mirza Baqar's guards thrust spears into the coach, accidentally killing one Turani guard inside and wounding the other, while Saulat Jang remained unharmed. Alivardi's men then opened the carriage, freed Saulat Jang. In the confusion, Haji Muhammad Amin escaped the scene by mounting Mir Muhammad Amin Khan's horse without his knowledge. Alivardi recovered Saulat Jung's family and seized all the horses of Mirza Baqer.

== Aftermath ==
Alivardi stayed at Odisha for three months to establish his authority. He appointed Shaikh Masum as the Deputy Governor of Odisha. Durlabh Ram, son of Jankiram, was now appointed peshkar of the Deputy Governor of Odisha.

== Bibliography ==
- Datta, Kalikinkar (1939). Alivardi and His Times. University of Calcutta.
- Haque, Mohammed Anwarul (1980). Muslim Administration in Orissa, 1568-1751 A.D. Punthi Pustak. Archived from the original on 2021-07-01.
- Ray, Bhabani Charan (1960). Orissa Under Marathas, 1751-1803. Kitab Mahal. Archived from the original on 2024-01-21.
- Sarkar, Jadunath (1964). Fall Of The Mughal Empire 1739-1754. Vol. I (3rd ed.). Orient Longman Ltd.
