= Zindabahar =

Bangladeshi television series

- Series poster
- জিন্দাবাহার
- Genre: Historical drama
- Created by: Mamunur Rashid
- Inspired by: Nawab Siraj-ud-Dowla by Abul Kalam Mohammed Zakaria
- Written by: Mamunur Rashid
- Screenplay by: Fazlay Azim Jewel
- Story by: Mamunur Rashid
- Directed by: Fazlay Azim Jewel
- Starring: See below
- Country of origin: Bangladesh
- Original languages: Bengali; English; Hindi
- No. of seasons: 1
- No. of episodes: 64

Production
- Producer: Fazlay Azim Jewel
- Production locations: Dhaka, Bangladesh
- Running time: 21–25 minutes
- Production company: Bangladesh Television

Original release
- Network: Bangladesh Television
- Release: 16 January – 12 June 2022

Zindabahar is a Bangladeshi historical television series that aired in 2022 on the state-owned Bangladesh Television. The series was produced and directed by Fazlay Azim Jewel. The story of the drama depicts the life of Nawab Siraj-ud-Daulah's family inside the prison for eight years.

== Plot ==
The year 1758 comes up in the story of the play. A royal boat from the Meghna River reaches Chandpur Ghat with an armed guard. The destination was Jinjira Palace in Dhaka. The occupants of the boat were Lutfa, wife of deceased Nawab Siraj-ud-Daulah, daughter Umme Zohra, aunt Ghaseti Begum, and mother Amina Begum. After a short break, the sailing barge again headed towards Dhaka. From here begins the eighteenth-century Dhaka story Zindabahar. Dhaka, the once prosperous capital of Bengal, was abandoned. But after the East India Company conquered Murshidabad, the English influence in Dhaka began to increase again. The famous muslin manufacturers were having a brilliant time in Dhaka. The members of the Nawab's family spent their days in cruel exile in Jinjira Palace, and an Englishman's Dhaka grew up with him.

== Cast ==
- Ahmed Rubel as Jasarat Khan
- Naznin Hasan Chumki as Ghaseti Begum
- Azad Abul Kalam as Ali Khan
- Rosey Siddiqui as Julia
- Shatabdi Wadud as Swintin
- Shormi Mala as Bilkis
- Shamim Visti as John
- Nairuz Sifat as Lutfunnisa Begum
- Lutfur Rahman George as Hakeem Sardar
- Nikita Nandini as Roshan Jaan
- Alif Chowdhury as Ross
- Rubli Chowdhury as Amina Begum
- Somu Chowdhury as William
- Shamsi Syka as Bara Begum
- Anant Hira as Mastan
- Subhasish Bhowmik as Govind
- Jayaraj as Hamdu
- Shahed Ali as Khosanveesh
- Shyamol Zakaria as Radheshyam
- Syed Shubo as Pogoz
- Sarika Sabrin as Darothi
- Sadman Pratyay as Harry
- Mir Ahsan as Shahar Chowdhury
- Mamunur Rashid as Talapatra

== Production ==
Work on Zindabahar began in November 2020. Preparations were going on for about a year before the shooting of this long serial drama. Because of the filming of the Mughal period story, it took some days to build the sets and make the costumes of the actors. Since the start of its shooting, the work has been delayed several times due to the Corona lockdown. However, its activities were moving forward from 10 August 2021, with the aim of airing it in October 2021. Different lighting patterns, modern set designs and VFX technology had been used to show the story from two centuries and a half before in Zindabahar. It was not used in Bangladeshi television dramas before. This drama was produced cinematically by using 4K technology. The series was directed and produced by Fazlay Azim Jewel, and the playwright of the series was Mamunur Rashid. This idea of the series first came to Rashid's mind after reading a book named Nawab Siraj-ud-Dowla, written by Abul Kalam Mohammed Zakaria and published by Prothoma.

== Release ==
The first episode of the series aired on 16 January 2022 at 9:30 pm. It aired every Sunday, Monday, and Tuesday at the same time on Bangladesh Television (BTV). Although it was supposed to air 52 episodes, this series ended after airing 64 episodes. The series is now available on the YouTube channel of BTV.

== See also ==
- Television in Bangladesh
