= Battle of Phulwari =

1741 battle in Odisha

- Part of Capture of Odisha (1741)
Date	3 March 1741
Location	Phulwari, Odisha
Result	Bengal Subah victory
Territorial changes	Odisha annexed to Bengal Subah

Belligerents
Bengal Subah	Odisha Subah

Commanders and leaders
Alivardi Khan; Sayyid Ahmad Khan; Manikchand (AWOL); Mir Jafar; Qasim Ali Khan; Musaheb Khan; Dilir Khan; Aslat Khan	Lutfullah Tabrizi; Agha Baqer Khan (WIA); Allauddin Muhammad Khan; Abed Khan; Mukhlis Ali Khan; Muqarrab Khan; Mujtaba Ali †; Mir Ali Akbar †; Mir Abdul Aziz †

Strength
10,000 or 12,000	Unknown soldiers 300 cannons

Casualties and losses
Unknown	300 killed All artilleries captured

The Battle of Phulwari on 3 March 1741 was a decisive engagement at the plains of Phulwari, near Balasore in present-day Odisha in Eastern India. In 1740 A.D. Alivardi Khan became the Nawab Bengal Subah deposing Sarfaraz Khan in the Battle of Giria. Lutfullah Tabrizi also known as Rustam Jang and Murshid Quli II, the Deputy Governor of Odisha, refused to accept Alivardi's suzerainty. He sought to avenge his brother-in-law Sarfaraz Khan and asserted independence. This ensued conflict between the two and Alivardi's forces clashed with Lutfullah Tabrizi's in a battle in the plains of Phulwari. Faced with betrayals, and a fierce counterattack led by Mir Jafar, the battle ended in Lutfullah Tabrizi's defeat, the death of key commanders, and the severe wounding of his son-in-law Mirza Baqar, solidifying Alivardi's control over Bengal, Bihar, and Odisha.

== Background ==
Alivardi Khan then the governor of Bihar marched from Patna into Bengal, defeated and killed Sarfaraz Khan (r. 1739–1740) at the Battle of Giria on 10 April 1740, and became the Nawab of Bengal, Bihar and Odisha. Lutfullah Tabrizi, the son-in-law of Shuja-ud-Din Muhammad Khan and Deputy Governor of Orissa (Odisha) refused to acknowledge the authority of Alivardi Khan. At first he tried to make an agreement with Alivardi. His wife Dardana Begam persuaded him to avenge her half-brother Sarfaraz’s death. Subsequently he declared independence.

== Prelude ==
Lutfullah Tabrizi left his wife Dardana Bagum and son Yahya Khan with all his wealth at the fort of Barabati. In December 1740, he marched from Cuttack with his two sons-in-law, Mirza Baqar Khan and Allauddin Muhammad Khan. Crossing Balasore he reached at the plains of Phulwari (Note: Four miles north of Balasore town.) and encamped there, forming a round circle of 300 cannons around the tents.

On hearing of Lutfullah Tabrizi's advance, Alivardi started from Murshidabad in January 1741 with his nephew, Sayyid Ahmad alias Saulat Jung, at the head of 10,000 or 12,000 cavalry, into Orissa. Ghulam Husain Salim writes Alivardi’s army made of 100,000 cavalry and infantry. According to Madla Panji, Alivardi the number is 500 elephants, 4,000 cavalry and one lakh infantry. The figures are over exaggerated.

Marching to Midnapore, Alivardi reached to Jalasore. There he crossed the Subarnarekha River and encamped at Ramachandrapur, three miles near the plains of Phulwari. Despite being near Lutfullah Tabrizi's camp, Alivardi could not attack due to severe provisions shortage caused by Midnapore zamindars failure to supply as the zamindars of Orissa who were loyal to Lutfullah Tabrizi intercepted the supplies. In the meantime, Maratha bargis raided his camp. Alivardi being pressed decided to make peace with Lutfullah Tabrizi, but Alivardi's general Mustafa Khan advised entrenching through the rains and renewing the campaign afterward.

== Battle ==
Conflicts erupted when Mirza Baqar, instigated by Abed Khan sallied forth from his camp a contingent composed of Barha Sayyid soldiers and launched an assault on Alivardi's forces. In the initial onslaught, Alivardi captured the entirety of Lutfullah Tabrizi's artillery, which had been left inadequately guarded due to Mirza Baqer's early assault. Lutfullah Tabrizi came out to help Mirza Baqer. Despite the significant loss, Lutfullah Tabrizi, Mirza Baqar, and their troops fought vigorously which forced portion of the Bengal soldiers to flee the battlefield, leaving their commander on the brink of defeat. Alivardi was pushed two miles away from the battlefield. Seeing Alivardi in distress, Manikchand, peshkar of the Raja of Burdwan, secretly offered to join Lutfullah Tabrizi's side with his troops for personal safety, but Mirza Baqar, suspecting his sincerity, opposed the proposal.

Lutfullah Tabrizi gained the upper hand on the battlefield but faced betrayal from his generals. Abed Khan entered into a secret agreement with Mustafa Khan, Alivardi's commander. Pretending to launch an attack on the enemy, Abed Khan advanced with his soldiers, only to defect to the opposing side. This betrayal was soon followed by similar actions from several other army officers, including Mukhlis Ali Khan, Muqarrab Khan, and a number of Afghan generals.

Undeterred by these defections, Mirza Baqar launched a swift and forceful assault on the left wing of Alivardi's army, which was under the command of veteran generals such as Mir Jafar and Qasim Ali Khan. This sudden attack initially caused great disorder and confusion among the Bengal forces. Mir Jafar, however, promptly mounted a gallant resistance, counterattacking Baqer's troops and coming to the aid of Alivardi's defeated generals, including Musaheb Khan, Dilir Khan, and Aslat Khan. This action greatly inspired Alivardi's soldiers, who renewed their assault on the enemy. Lutfullah Tabrizi's generals Mujtaba Ali, Mir Ali Akbar, and Mir Abdul Aziz was slain alongside 300 Sayyid soldiers. Mirza Baqar was wounded seriously and was carried from the battlefield in a palanquin. The army abandoned the fight. Lutfullah Tabrizi fled for his safety. Thus Alivardi gained victory in the battle of Phulwari.

== Aftermath ==
Lutfullah Tabrizi fled to Masaulipatam in the territory of Asaf Jah Nizam-ul-Mulk in Deccan. Alivardi dispatched Mirza Khairullah Beg to capture Dardana Bagum and Yahya Khan. Ramchandradeva II of Khurdah, loyal to Lutfullah Tabrizi dispatched his general Shah Murad Khan. Mirza Khairullah Beg seized Lutfullah Tabrizi's treasure but his family fled. He stayed at Odisha for two months and appointed Sayyid Ahmad Khan alias Saulat Jung, his second son-in-law as the Deputy Governor of Orissa He also left Gujar Khan in command of three thousand cavalry and four thousand infantry.

== See also ==
- Battle of Giria
- Battle of Katwa
- Battle of Rani Sarai

== Bibliography ==
- Datta, Kalikinkar (1939). Alivardi and His Times. University of Calcutta.
- Haque, Mohammed Anwarul (1980). Muslim Administration in Orissa, 1568-1751 A.D. Punthi Pustak. Archived from the original on 2021-07-01.
- Banerji, R. D. (1951). History of Orissa. Vol. II. Calcutta: Prabasi Press.
- Ray, Bhabani Charan (1960). Orissa Under Marathas, 1751-1803. Kitab Mahal. Archived from the original on 2024-01-21.
- Sarkar, Jadunath (1964). Fall Of The Mughal Empire 1739-1754. Vol. I (3rd ed.). Orient Longman Ltd.
