= Lutfullah Tabrizi =

Naib Nazim of Jahangirnagar (1728–1733) and Orissa (1734–1741)

Mirza Lutfullah Tabrizi Murshid Quli Khan Bahadur, Rustam Jang

Naib Nazim of Dhaka
- In office 1728–1733
- Monarch: Nasiruddin Muhammad Shah
- Preceded by: Itisam Khan's son
- Succeeded by: Sarfaraz Khan

Naib Nazim of Orissa
- In office 1734–1741
- Preceded by: Taqi Khan
- Succeeded by: Syed Ahmad Khan

Personal details
- Born: Surat, Gujarat, Mughal Empire
- Died: Deccan Plateau, Maratha Empire
- Spouse: Durdana Begum Sahiba
- Children: Mirza Muhammad Yahya Khan Bahadur (son); Two daughters
- Parent: Haji Shukrullah Tabrizi (father)
- Relatives: Sarfaraz Khan (brother-in-law), Shuja-ud-Din Muhammad Khan (father-in-law), Mirza Agha Baqer (son-in-law)

Mīrzā Lutfullāh Khān Tabrīzī (Persian: ميرزا لطف الله تبریزی, Bengali: মীর্জা লুৎফুল্লাহ তবরীজী), also known as Murshid Qulī Khān II and Rustam Jang, was an 18th-century administrator who served under the Nawabs of Bengal as the Naib Nazim of Jahangirnagar (Dhaka) and Orissa respectively. Lutfullah was also a calligrapher, as well as an author in the Persian language under the pen name Sarshār (Persian: سرشار).

Azad al-Husaini's Naubahar-i-Murshid-Quli-Khani book is dedicated to Lutfullah, and celebrates him as the conqueror of Lower Tippera. This is because Tippera was only nominally under Mughal rule, and was fully annexed during Lutfullah's tenure as Naib Nazim.

== Early life and family ==
Mirza Lutfullah was born in 1684, in the city of Surat in Gujarat. His father, Haji Shukrullah, was originally from Safavid Iran and had migrated to Surat. Lutfullah studied under Aqa Habibullah Isfahani.

After his father's death, Lutfullah left Surat for Bengal as a merchant where he gained popularity in the court of the Nawab of Bengal. Shuja-ud-Din Muhammad Khan married off his daughter, Durdana Begum Sahiba, to Lutfullah. The couple had one son, Mirza Muhammad Yahya Khan Bahadur, and two daughters. Bangali Begum Sahiba, also known as Mehman Begum, was their eldest daughter, and their youngest daughter was the wife of Ala ud-din Muhammad Khan.

== Career ==
In 1728, Lutfullah was appointed by his father-in-law Nawab Shuja-ud-Din Muhammad Khan as the regional governor at Jahangirnagar. Along with this appointment, Lutfullah was given the title of Murshid Quli Khan II. During his tenure, Murshid Quli Khan II had shops constructed in Chowk Bazaar. As the Nizamat of Jahangirnagar covered all of eastern Bengal, Lutfullah's responsibility also spread outside of Dhaka. He is credited for the complete Mughal annexation of Lower Tippera, which was formally only nominally under Mughal rule.

In 1734, Lutfullah was transferred to govern the Nizamat of Orissa. The Battle of Giria near Murshidabad on 10 April 1740 meant the ascension of Alivardi Khan as the new Nawab of Bengal. Lutfullah rejected the authority of Alivardi. Along with his son-in-law Mirza Agha Baqer, Lutfullah proceeded from Cuttack in Orissa towards Balasore and towards December 1740, established a camp at Phulwari near Balasore in Bihar. Lutfullah was severely wounded in battle the Battle of Phulwari and was defeated on 3 March 1741, later fleeing to Machilipatnam in South India with Baqer. Alivardi later appointed Syed Ahmad Khan as the Naib Nazim of Orissa.

In the Deccan, Lutfullah served the Nizam of Hyderabad and spent the rest of his life. In the literary sphere, his magnum opus is Makhmur.

Political offices
| Preceded by Itisam Khan's son | Naib Nazim of Jahangirnagar (Dhaka); 1728-1733 | Succeeded by Sarfaraz Khan |
| Preceded by Taqi Khan | Naib Nazim of Orissa; 1734-1741 | Succeeded by Syed Ahmad Khan |

== See also ==
- History of Dhaka
- Jahangir Nagar
