= Nimtali arch =

Historic site in Dhaka, Bangladesh

Arch of Nimtali
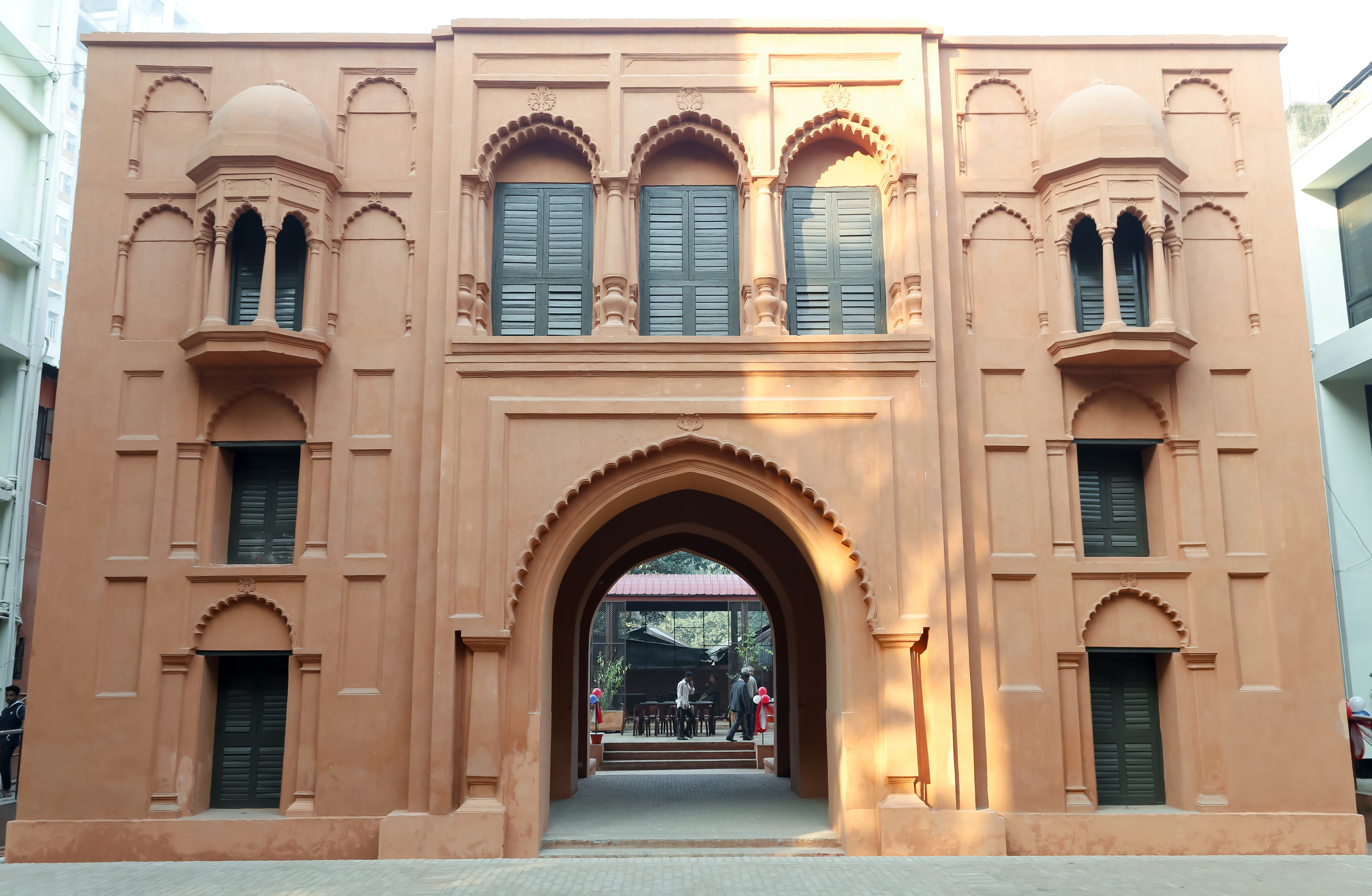
- Location: Asiatic Society of Bangladesh; 5 Old Secretariat Road, Nimtali, Ramna, Dhaka 1000, Bangladesh
- Coordinates: 23.7245°N 90.4024°E

The Nimtali arch (known in Bengali as Nimtali Deuri) is an arch in Dhaka, Bangladesh dating from the Mughal period. It was the gateway to the palace of the Naib Nazim of Dhaka, the deputy governor of Bengal Subah in the Mughal Empire. Today, the structure is located on the premises of the Asiatic Society of Bangladesh and houses the Asiatic Society Heritage Museum. It is a public museum showcasing Dhaka's history in the 18th and 19th centuries.

== History ==
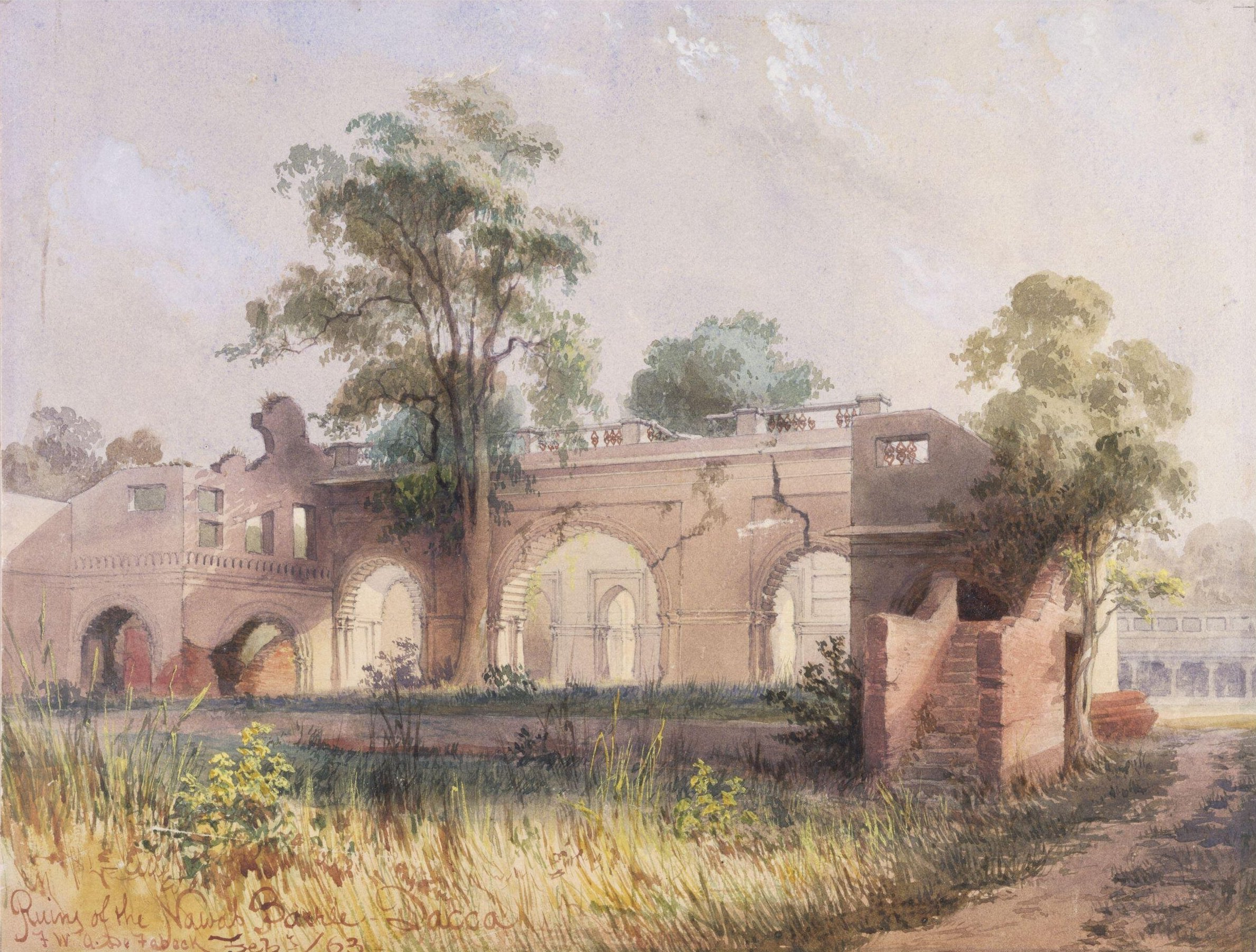
Ruins of the former Nimtali Palace, 1863

=== Nimtali Palace ===
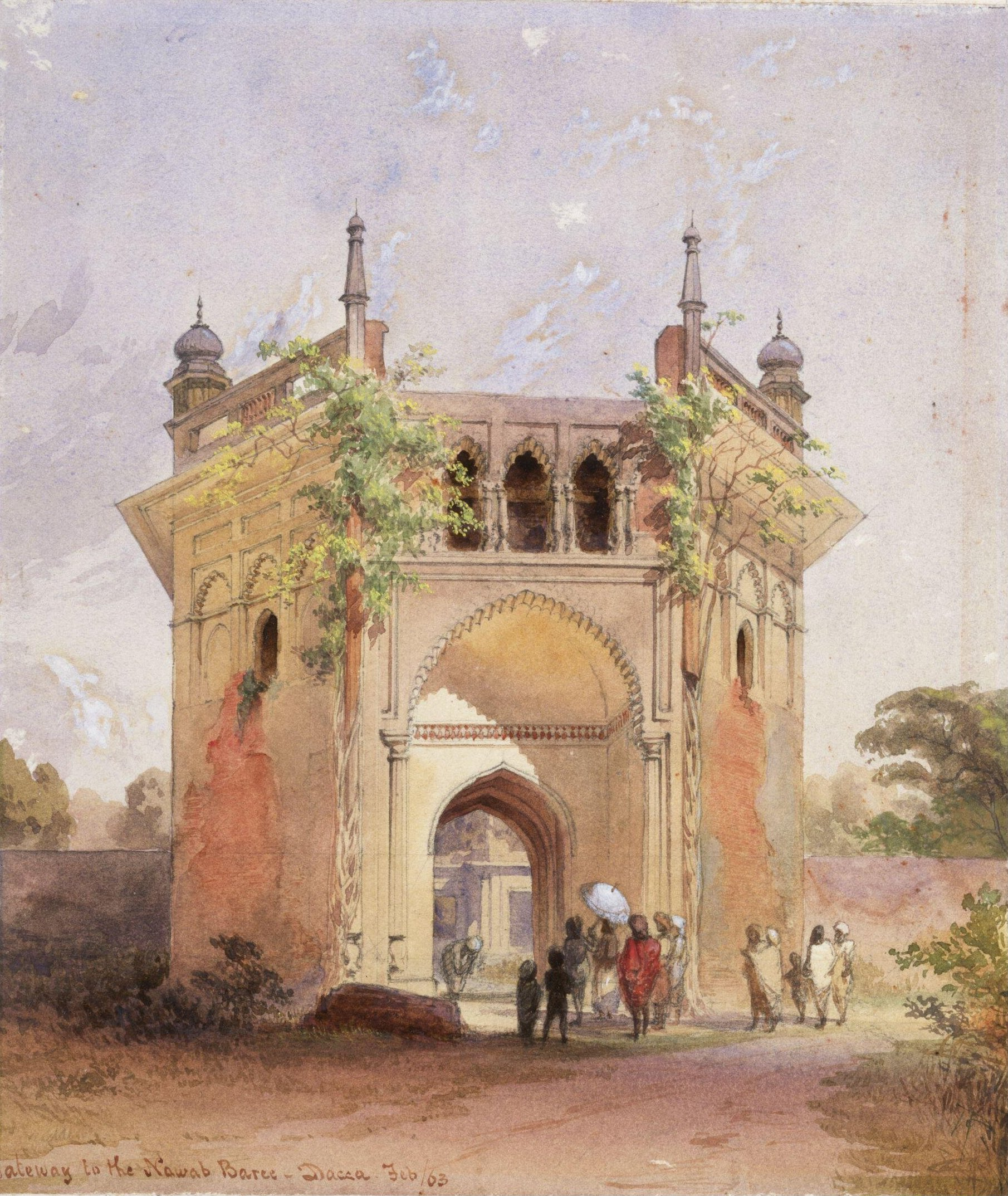
The backside facade of the arch in 1863

Nimtali Palace was the residence of the Naib Nazim (Deputy-Governor) of Dhaka-Niabat (Dhaka Division) in the 18th and 19th centuries. Dhaka Division covered large parts of eastern Bengal, including present-day Dhaka, Comilla, Noakhali and Chittagong. Dhaka Division was one of the largest sources of revenue for the Mughal Empire, including the imperial court in Delhi and the court of the Nawab of Bengal in Murshidabad. The Naib Nazims were responsible for revenue collection, relations with foreign trading companies and the Mughal Navy. They built the Nimtali Palace around 1765–1766. Their power gradually declined after the British East India Company took control of Dhaka in 1793. The Naib Nazims continued live in opulence, along with the Dhaka elite. The office of the Naib Nazim was abolished in 1843 as the British consolidated control over India. The palace eventually fell into ruins.

Only the gateway of the palace has survived to this day. It is called Nimtali Deuri in Bengali. The arch was depicted in many paintings of European artists during British rule. Charles D'Oyly depicted the arch in his works. In several historical texts and paintings, it was depicted as part of the Dhaka Nawab Palace.

=== Asiatic Society ===
On 3 January 1953, Ahmad Hassan Dani founded the Asiatic Society of Pakistan on the grounds of Nimtali Palace. The organization was formed as a learned society modelled on the Asiatic Society of Bengal. In 1972, the organization was renamed as the Asiatic Society of Bangladesh.

== Architecture ==
The arch is an example of Indo-Islamic architecture. The arch has two distinct facades. On one side, the facade includes two hanging Mughal style canopies. On another side, the facade is a large arch in the Mughal style. It is possibly an evolution of the 'Shaista Khan Style', which was a style of Mughal architecture unique to Dhaka.

== Restoration ==
Amid public concern over maintenance, the Asiatic Society undertook an extensive restoration of the arch between 2009 and 2011. This was supported by the Bangladeshi Ministry of Cultural Affairs on the occasion of the 400th anniversary of Dhaka's founding under Mughal rule. The restoration cost BDT 1.5 crore.

== Museum ==
A public museum showcasing the life of Dhaka's elite in the 18th and 19th centuries is now housed inside the arch's three floors. It was opened in January 2019. The ground floor includes video presentations, records of Dhaka's history and tributes to the founders of the Asiatic Society. The second floor showcases belongings of the Naib Nazims, including paintings, chest boxes and teacups. The third floor has the largest collection of exhibits spanning the Mughal and British periods, including a prop up of the Naib Nazim's court, porcelain, coins, clippings of the Lloyd's Evening Post, paintings, muslin and other historical items.
