= Abul Kalam Mohammed Zakaria =

Bangladeshi scholar and archeologist

- আবুল কালাম মোহাম্মদ যাকারিয়া
- Born: c. 1918; Brahmanbaria, Bengal Presidency, British India
- Died: February 24, 2016 (aged 97–98); Dhaka, Bangladesh
- Resting place: Darikandi village, Bancharampur Upazila, Brahmanbaria District
- Education: University of Dhaka
- Awards: Ekushey Padak

Abul Kalam Mohammed Zakaria (c. 1918 – 24 February 2016) was a Bangladeshi scholar and archaeologist. He was awarded the Ekushey Padak in 2015 and the Bangla Academy Literary Award in 2005 by the Government of Bangladesh for his contribution to research.

== Education and career ==
Zakaria earned his bachelor's in English literature from the University of Dhaka. In 1946, he started his career as a teacher at Azizul Haq College in Bogra. Later, he joined the civil service.

In 1968, Zakaria helped to discover a site containing Sintakote Vihar of the 5th century in Dinajpur.

Zakira retired from the position of Secretary of the Ministry of Culture and Sports in 1976.

== Works ==
Zakaria edited the following books.

- Gupi Chandrer Sonyas
- Gazi Kalu O Champabati
- Bangladesher Nreetotya
- Comilla Zelar Itihash
- Tabaqat-i Nasiri

== Awards ==
- Ekushey Padak (2015)
- Bangla Academy Literary Award (2005)
- Asiatic Society Man of the Year Gold Medal
- ROOTS Lifetime Achievement Award 2009
