= Ghaseti Begum =

Eldest daughter of Nawab Alivardi Khan

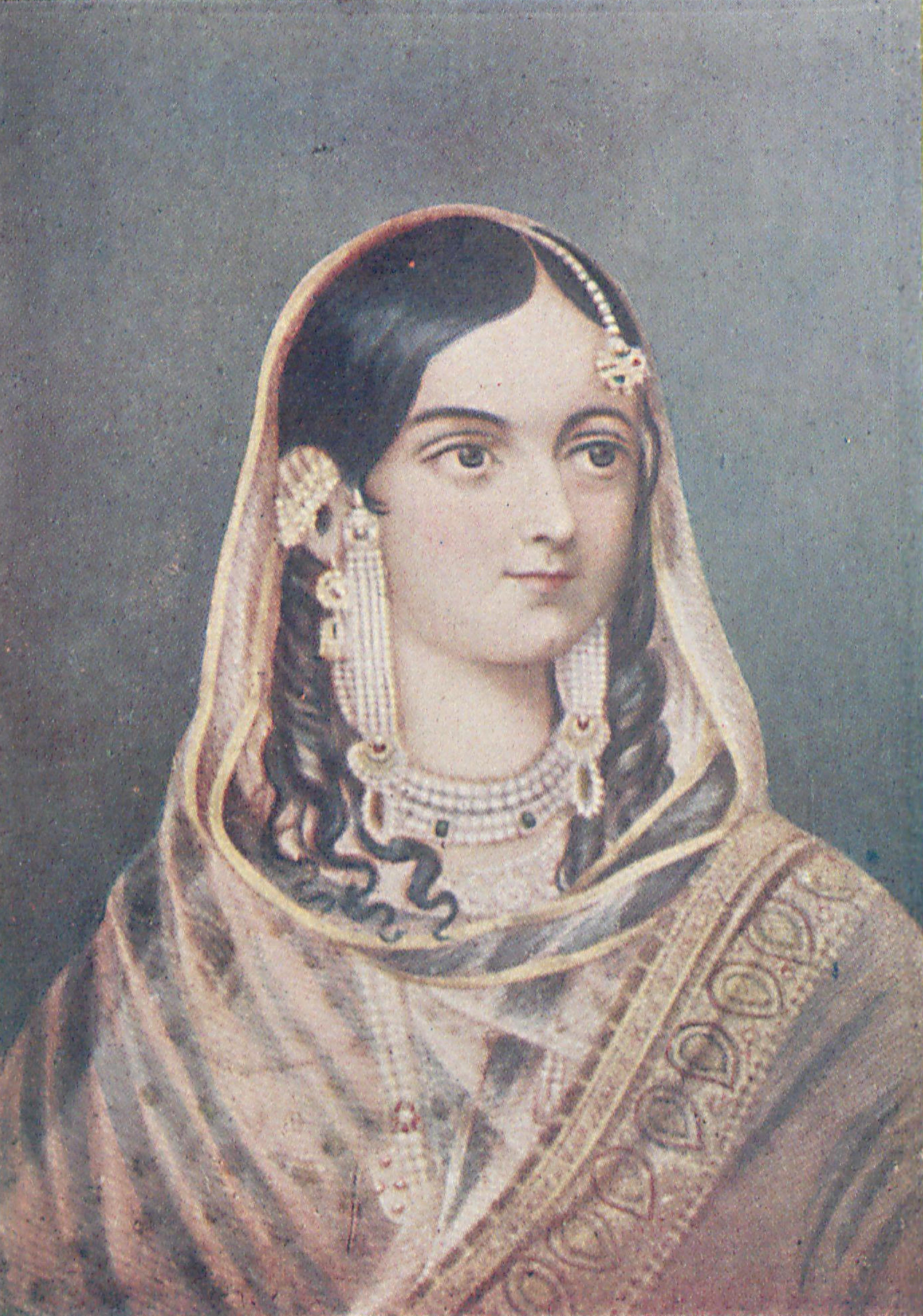
- Portrait of Ghaseti Begum, from the book Banglar Begum.
- Spouse: Nawazish Muhammad Khan
Names
- Nawabzadi Meher un-Nisa Begum
- Father: Alivardi Khan
- Religion: Shia Islam

Mehar un-Nisa Begum (Persian: مهر النساء بیگم), better known as Ghaseti Begum (Bengali: ঘসেটি বেগম, romanized: Ghôśeṭi Begôm), was the eldest daughter of Alivardi Khan, Nawab of Bengal, Bihar and Orissa during 1740–1756.

== Early life ==
Ghaseti Begum was the eldest daughter of Nawab Alivardi Khan, the Nawab of Bengal, and Princess Sharfunnisa, the paternal aunt of Mir Jafar. Her paternal grandfather was Mirza Muhammad Madani, who was of either Arab or Turkic descent, the son of a foster-brother of the Mughal emperor Aurangzeb. Her paternal grandmother belonged to the Turkic Afshar tribe of Khorasan. Through her, she was a relative of Shuja-ud-Din Muhammad Khan, the two having shared a common ancestor in Nawab Aqil Khan.

Ghaseti Begum married her paternal cousin, Nawazish Muhammad Khan, who was the Naib Nazim of Dhaka. Being childless, the couple adopted Ikram ud-Daulah, the son of her younger sister Amina Begum. But Ikram ud-Daulah died of smallpox at a young age. Soon after Nawazish Muhammad also died from grief. Ghaseti Begum inherited vast wealth from her husband.

== Conspiracy against Siraj ud-Daulah ==
After the death of Nawab Alivardi Khan, Ghaseti Begum tried to enthrone Shaukat Jang, the son of her second sister Maimuna Begum. But court officials did not agree with her as there was a rumour that Shaukat Jang was the illegitimate son of Maimuna and Rajballabh Sen. Due to this, Siraj ud-Daulah managed to ascend to the power of Bengal. Eventually she secretly conspired against Siraj with the help of Mir Jafar, the chief of Alivardi Khan's army, along with Rajballabh Sen, and the merchants Omichund and Jagat Seth.

== Death ==
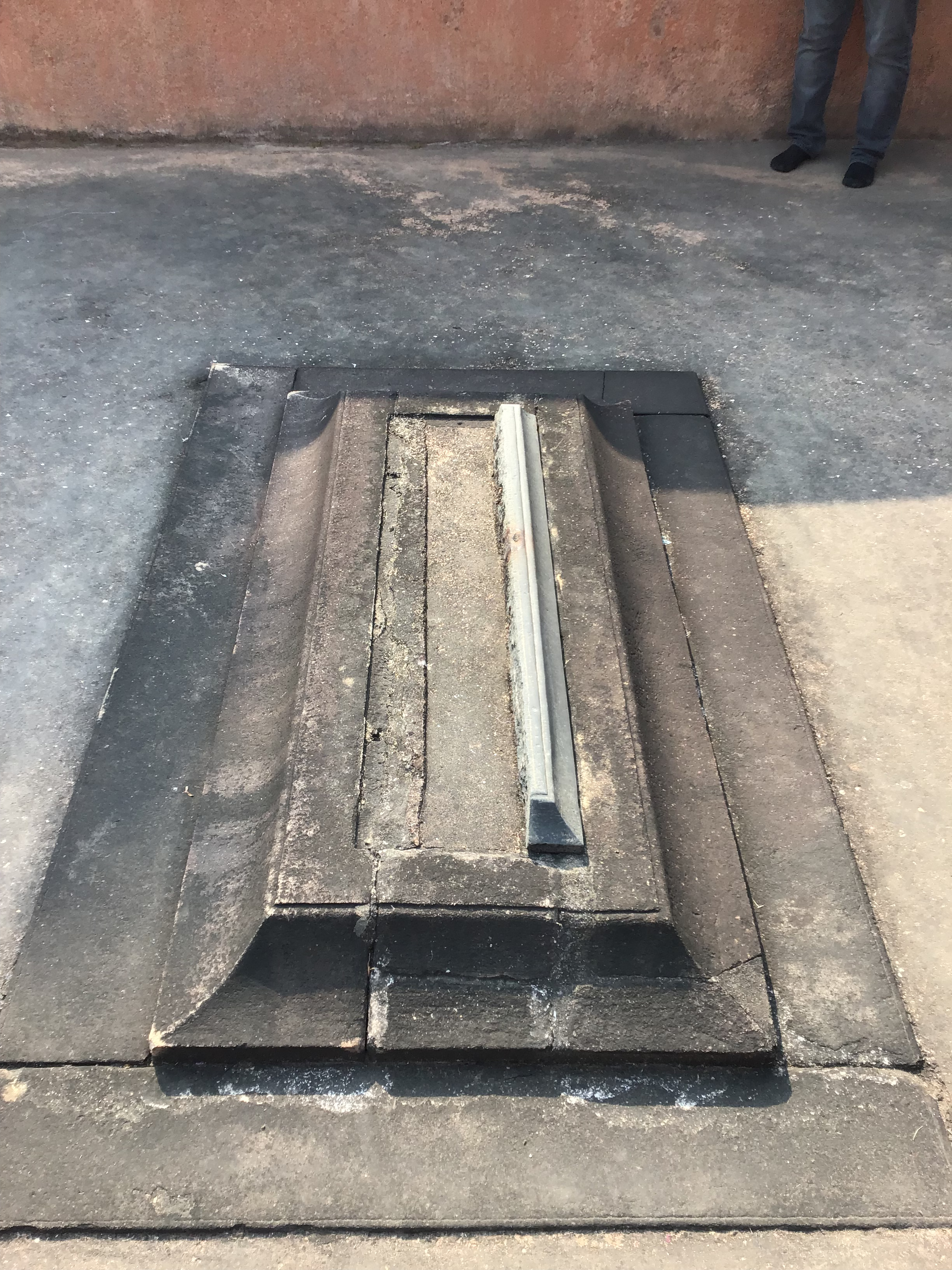
Tomb of Ghaseti Begum at Khosbag

After the fall of Siraj ud-Daulah in the Battle of Plassey in 1757, Ghaseti was imprisoned in the Jinjira Palace by Mir Jafar. But sensing danger, Miran, son of Mir Jafar, moved Ghaseti to Murshidabad in 1760. She was believed to have been drowned in the Buriganga River on the way by order of Miran.

== See also ==
- Nawabs of Bengal
- History of Bengal
- History of Bangladesh
- History of India
