= Nawazish Muhammad Khan =

Mughal aristocrat and the deputy governor of Dhaka

- شاه‌مات جنگ Shahmat Jang
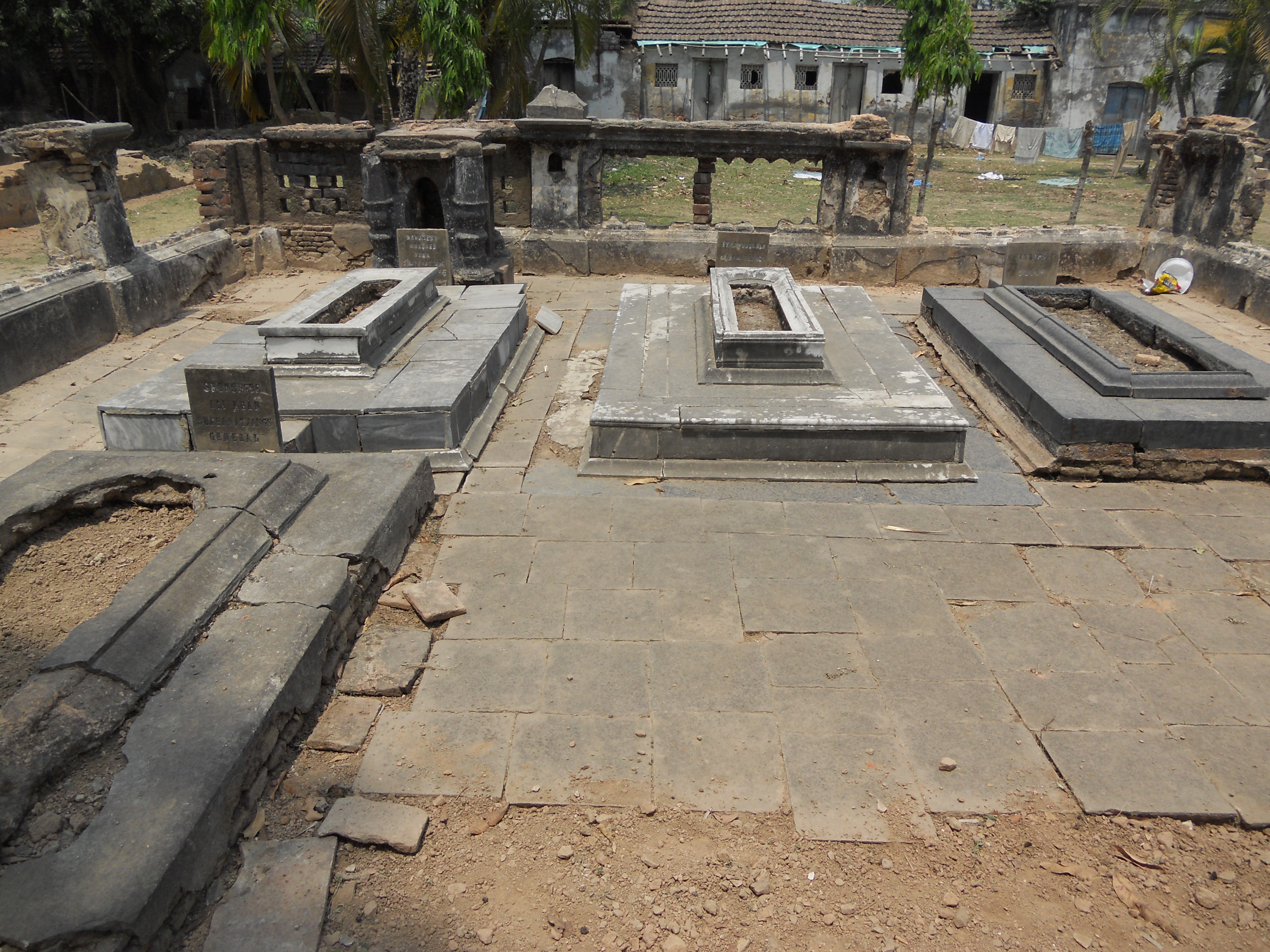
- Burial plot of Nawazish Muhammad Khan in Murshidabad

Naib Nazim of Jahangirnagar
- Reign: 1740-1755
- Predecessor: Abdul Fattah Khan
- Successor: Jasarat Khan
- Died: 1755; Murshidabad, Bengal Subah
- Burial: 1755; Murshidabad, Bengal Subah
- Spouse: Ghaseti Begum
Names
- Mirza Nawazish Muhammad Raza Khan
- House: Afshar (by birth)
- Father: Haji Ahmad
- Religion: Shia Islam

Nawazish Muhammad Khan (Persian: نوازش محمد خان; died 1755), also known as Mirza Muhammad Raza, was a Mughal aristocrat and the deputy governor of Dhaka in the 18th century.

== Biography ==
Mirza Muhammad Raza was the eldest son of Haji Ahmad, the elder brother of Alivardi Khan. Raza's paternal grandfather Mirza Muhammad Madani, who was of either Arab or Turkic descent, was the son of a foster-brother of the Mughal emperor Aurangzeb. Raza had two brothers, Sayed Ahmed Khan and Mirza Muhammad Hashim.

== Career ==
Nawazish Muhammad Khan had arrived at the Bengal Subah accompanied by his father Haji Ahmad and uncle Alivardi Khan. He worked under his cousin Shuja-ud-Din Muhammad Khan, the Naib Nazim of Orissa, as a petty officer. After Shuja-ud-Din Muhammad Khan became Nawab of Bengal, Nawazish was made the paymaster of the Nawab's army. He was also made the superintendent of customs based in Murshidabad. After Alivardi Khan became the Nawab of Bengal, Nawazish was appointed Dewan of crown lands. He was also named the governor of Dhaka with Husain Quli Khan as his deputy governor. He was also given the title Shahmat Jang.

In 1751, he founded the Furqaniyyah Dar al-Ulum Madrasa in Motijhil, Murshidabad, which he would personally supervise. The madrasa taught Islamic studies, Arabic, Persian and Bengali. He also built a jami mosque between the madrasa and his palace.

== Family ==
Nawazish married Ghaseti Begum, the eldest daughter of his uncle Alivardi Khan. This marriage was childless and he adopted as his son Ikramuddaula, who was nephew to both Nawazish and Ghaseti through his brother and her sister respectively. Historian Syed Murtaza Ali identified Nawazish as having also been the husband of the Jaintia princess Bhairav Kawari, sister of Bar Gosain II, and the father of her son Fateh Khan.

Nawazish, on the instructions of Alivardi, also adopted as his mother Zinat-un-nisa (Nafisa Begum), whose son had been the late Nawab Sarfaraz Khan. She enjoyed absolute authority over his household, superseding even Ghaseti Begum, though she never appeared in front of him without a veil or curtain between them.

== Death ==
Due to his illness, the state affairs were managed by his wife Ghaseti Begum and his deputy. The death of their adopted son Ikramuddaula from smallpox profoundly effected both Nawazish and Ghaseti. Nawazish, grief-stricken, died soon after in 1755. He was buried in front of his mosque in Motijhil, next to his adopted son Ikramuddaula and commander-in-chief Shamsher Ali Khan.
