= Naib Nazim of Dhaka =

Chief Mughal administrator of Jahangir Nagar or Dhaka

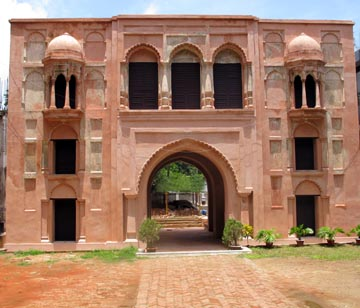
- The surviving gateway of Nimtali Kuthi, the last residence of the Naib Nazims of Dhaka
- Appointer: Nawab of Bengal (1717-1779); British East India Company (1779-1843)
- Formation: 1717
- First holder: Khan Muhammad Ali Khan
- Final holder: Ghaziuddin Haidar
- Abolished: 1843

The Naib Nazim of Dhaka, officially the Naib Nazim of Jahangir Nagar, was the chief political officer in the city of Dhaka, the present-day capital of Bangladesh, between the mid-18th and mid-19th centuries. It was the second-highest office in the political hierarchy of Subah of Bengal, including a nominal position during the East India Company's occupation of Bengal.

The Naib Nazim was the deputy of the Nawab of Bengal, who was based in Murshidabad. The Naib Nazim was responsible for governing territories in eastern Bengal, including revenue collection, army and navy affairs, and administering justice. In the later period of British rule, the Naib Nazims were heavily influenced by English culture, spoke fluent English and collected Western art. The 19th-century office holder Nusrat Jung was described as an anglophile.

Dhaka's status as a leading financial and commercial center of Mughal India lent significant influence to the office of the Naib Nazim. The Naib Nazims initially resided in Islam Khan's Fort and the Bara Katra. The Nimtali Kuthi was their last official residence.

The government and era of the Naib Nazims is known as the niabat. Prior to the niabat, Dhaka was the viceregal capital of Subahdar of Bengal. The Naib Nazims can be compared with the position of Lieutenant Governor in rank and equivalence. The abolishing of the Naib Nazim's office coincided with Dhaka's decline as the leading city of Bengal. The next time Dhaka's political prominence was revived was during the short lived British province of Eastern Bengal and Assam.

== History ==
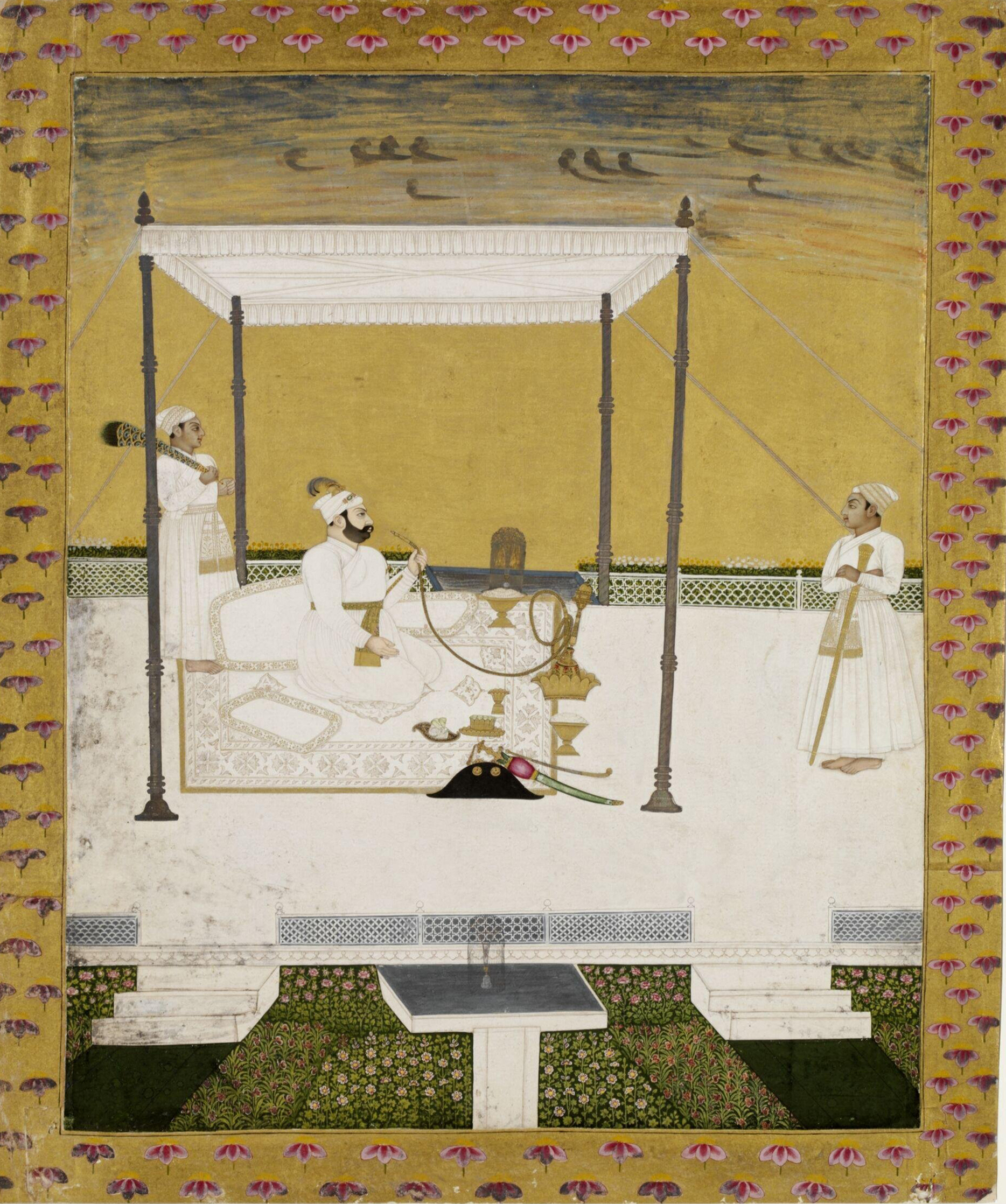
Husain Quli Khan (deputy governor of Dhaka 1740–1754). Siraj-ud-Daulah envied his wealth and power and had him murdered in Murshidabad in 1754

The office was created between 1716 and 1717, when prime minister Murshid Quli Khan transferred the capital of Bengal from Dhaka to Murshidabad. Emperor Farrukhsiyar appointed Khan as the Subedar of Bengal.

As the authority of the Mughal imperial court declined, Khan replaced the position of Subedar with a hereditary Nawab. In the former capital, Dhaka, he anointed a deputy to administer eastern Bengal. The earliest prominent Naib Nazims of Dhaka included Khan Muhammad Ali Khan (1717), Itisam Khan (1723–1726) and Lutfullah Tabrizi (1728–1733). During the tenure of Sarfaraz Khan, Dhaka saw rapid economic growth. Nawazish Muhammad Khan ruled through his wife Ghaseti Begum and his deputy Husain Quli Khan. Jasarat Khan, appointed by Alivardi Khan, was the Naib Nazim during the Battle of Plassey in 1757, the year that heralded great political change in Bengal. After a brief suspension, Jasarat Khan continued to hold the office until 1778, with support from the British East India Company. Muhammad Reza Khan interrupted Jasarat Khan's tenure in 1763, 1775 and 1779. After the death of Jasarat Khan, his three grandsons, Hashmat Jung (1779–1785), Nusrat Jung (1785–1822) and Shamsuddaula (1822–1831) held the office.

From 1793, the family was pensioned off with the royal title of Naib Nazim of Dhaka. The nominal office was formally abolished in 1843. Ghaziuddin Haidar was the last Naib Nazim. Here is a list of Naib-Nazims of Dhaka:

- Khan Muhammad Ali Khan (1717)
- Itisam Khan (1723–1726)
- A son of Itisam Khan (1726–1727)
- Mirza Lutfullah Tabrizi (a grandson-in-law of Murshid Quli Khan) (1728–1734)
- Sarfaraz Khan (1734–1739)
  - Galib Ali Khan (1734–1738)
  - Murad Ali Khan (1738–1739)
- Abdul Fattah Khan (1739–1740)
- Nawazish Muhammad Khan (1740–1754) (son in-law-of Alivardi Khan)
  - Hossain Quli Khan (1740–1754)
  - Murad Dowlat (1754–1755)
- Jasarat Khan (1755–1762 and 1765–1778)
  - Mohammed Ali (1762–1762)
  - Mohammed Reza Khan (1763–1765)
- Hashmat Jung Syed Muhammad (the eldest grandson of Jasarat Khan) (1779–1785)
- Nusrat Jung (the second grandson of Jasarat Khan) (1785–1822)
- Shamsuddaula (the third grandson of Jasarat Khan) (1822–1831)
- Jalaluddin Muhammad Qamaruddaulah (a son of Shamsuddaula) (1831–1834)
- Ghaziuddin Haider (a son of Qamaruddaulah) (1834–1843)

The British-era Naib Nazims of Dhaka were influenced by the Western culture and way of life. They learnt the English language and patronised Western art. According to Charles D'Oyly, Nusrat Jung's audience chamber was filled with English prints and paintings. Nusrat Jung was well versed in history and current affairs and could speak English fluently. Nusrat Jung was the longest serving Naib Nazim.

Dhaka's trade and commerce grew during the niabat. Exports by European companies from Dhaka quadrupled. The Naib Nazims relied on Dhaka's wealthy Armenian community and Marwari bankers. The Muslim-ruled city was home to a Hindu merchant class, and the majority of the population of the city belonged to the Hindu community. The city hosted factories of the Dutch, French, English and Portuguese.

== Powers ==
The Naib Nazim's duties were to administer justice, supervise trade professions, identify and punish seditious persons, collect and deposit revenue punctually at the treasury and maintain military bases, forts and the navy. For administration expenses, the revenues of Dhaka, Mymensingh, Sylhet and other districts were assigned to him. The Naib Nazim owned riverside properties for the upkeep of naval boats and personnel. The properties were, however, confiscated by the British gradually. The Naib Nazim of Dhaka had revenue and administrative powers until 1790. As a result of Mughal defeat in the Battle of Buxar, the Naib Nazim's functions were greatly reduced.

In 1790, Lord Cornwallis abolished the powers of the Naib Nazim. Dhaka formally passed to the control of the East India Company in 1793. Later, Naib Nazims held the office nominally, as a symbol of the Mughal aristocracy under company rule in India. All Mughal positions were permanently abolished in India after the Mutiny of 1857, which led to the establishment of the British Indian Empire as a crown colony.

== Residence ==
The Naib Nazims initially resided in Islam Khan's fort (now located in the premises of the Dhaka Central Jail). After the British took control of the fort, the Naib Nazims moved to the Bara Katra (Great Caravenserai Palace). In 1766, the Nimtali Kuthi became the official residence of the Naib Nazims. Today, only the gateway of the Nimtali Kuthi survives.

== Customs ==
The Naib Nazims were associated with medieval glory and elegance. They wore the finest muslin and silk dresses, smoked hookahs, played polo, went on hunting trips, and maintained harems. An annual grand Eid procession was brought out by the Naib Nazims.

== See also ==
- Nawab of Dhaka
- Prime Minister of Bengal
- Legislative Council of Eastern Bengal and Assam
