= Alivardi Khan =

Nawab of Bengal from 1740 to 1756

- Shuja ul-Mulk (Valiant of the country); Hashim ud-Daula (Sword of the state); Mahabat Jang (Horror in War); Nawab of Bengal
- Darbar of Alivardi Khan at Murshidabad's Court, c. 1750–1753

Nawab of Bengal, Bihar and Orissa
- Reign: 29 April 1740 – March 1751
- Predecessor: Sarfaraz Khan
- Successor: Himself (as Nawab Nazim of Bengal and Bihar) (Raghoji I in Orissa)

Nawab Nazim of Bengal and Bihar
- Reign: March 1751 – 9 April 1756
- Predecessor: Position established
- Successor: Siraj ud-Daulah

Naib Nazim of Bihar
- Reign: 1733–1740
- Predecessor: Fakhr-ud-Daula (as Mughal Subahdar)
- Successor: Zain ud-Din Ahmed Khan

Faujdar of Rajmahal
- Reign: 1728–1733
- Predecessor: Mirza Muhammad Baqir
- Successor: Zain ud-Din Ahmed Khan
- Born: 1676; Deccan Plateau, Mughal Empire
- Died: 9 April 1756 (aged 79–80); Murshidabad, Bengal, Mughal Empire
- Burial: Khushbagh, West Bengal, India
- Spouse: Sharfunnesa
- Issue: Ghaseti Begum; Maimuna Begum; Amina Begum
Names
- Shuja ul-Mulk Hashim ud-Daula Mahabat Jang Mirza Muhammad Alivardi Khan
- Tribe: Afsharid
- Father: Mirza Muhammad Shah Quli Khan Madani
- Mother: A descendant of the Afshar tribe
- Religion: Shia Islam
- Military career
- Conflicts: Battle of Giria; Capture of Odisha (1741); Battle of Phulwari; Maratha invasions; First invasion; Battle of Katwa (1742); Second invasion; Third invasion; Fourth invasion; Battle of Bhagalpur (1745); Fifth invasion; Siege of Cuttack (1749); Afghan rebellions; Battle of Rani Sarai

Alivardi Khan (Bengali: আলীবর্দী খাঁ, Bengali pronunciation: [alibordi kʰã]; 1676 – 9 April 1756) was the fourth Nawab of Bengal from 1740 to 1756. He toppled the Nasiri dynasty by defeating Sarfaraz Khan in the Battle of Giria and assumed power himself.

During much of his reign Alivardi encountered frequent Maratha raids under Raghoji Bhonsle, culminating in the surrender of the province of Orissa in a peace settlement in 1751. He also faced Afghan rebellions in Bihar as well as a revolt from his grandson Siraj ud-Daulah, though these were suppressed.

Alivardi spent the latter part of his reign rebuilding Bengal. He was a patron of the arts and resumed the policies of Murshid Quli Khan. He maintained a politically neutral stance with the European powers in the subcontinent and prevented any infighting amongst them in his dominions. He was succeeded by Siraj ud-Daulah in 1756.

== Early life ==
Originally Mirza Bande or Mirza Muhammad Ali, Alivardi was a native of the Deccan who was born in 1676. His father Mirza Muhammad Madani, who was of Arab descent, was the son of a foster-brother of the Mughal emperor Aurangzeb; Madani himself began his career as a cup-bearer under the latter's son Azam Shah. Muhammad Ali's mother descended from the Iranian Turkmen Afshar tribe of Khorasan. Through her, he was a cousin of Shuja-ud-Din Muhammad Khan, also known as Mirza Deccani. (Note: Historian Abdus Subhan reported that Muhammad Ali and Shuja-ud-Din shared the same grandfather, Nawab Aqil Khan. However, Karam Ali's Muzaffarnama, a contemporary history, notes that he and Aqil Khan merely had the same ancestry "in their 3rd / 4th upward generation".)

Like their father, he and his elder brother Mirza Ahmad (later known as Haji Ahmad) found favour under Azam Shah. Muhammad Ali was named superintendent of the feelkhana (elephant-stables) as well as being given responsibility over the zardozkhana (department of embroidered cloths). However, following Azam Shah's death in 1707, the family fell into poverty. They migrated to Cuttack in Orissa, then under the deputy-governorship of their relative Shuja-ud-Din. Finding employment with the latter, Muhammad Ali and Mirza Ahmad proved themselves capable in supporting his government, later even aiding Shuja-ud-Din in becoming Nawab of Bengal.

== Rise to power ==
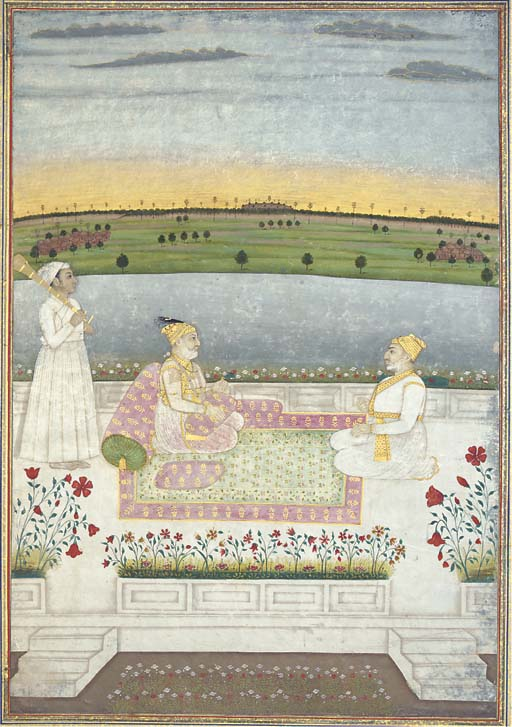
Alivardi Khan with a courtier, Murshidabad, c. 1745

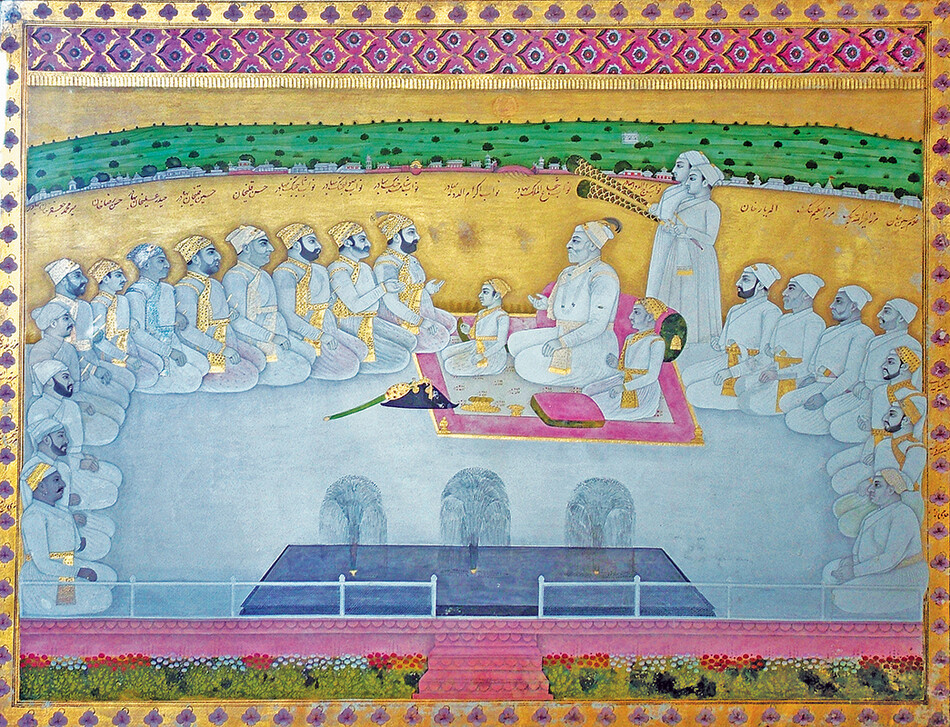
Alivardi Khan hosting his nephew Shahamat Jang’s adoption of his grandson Ikram ud-Daula after the death of Ikram's father Zain ud-Din Ahmed Khan in Patna. c. 1748

In 1728, Shuja-ud-Din promoted Muhammad Ali to Faujdar (General) of Rajmahal and entitled him as Alivardi Khan. In 1733, he was assigned as the Naib Nazim (Deputy Subahdar) of Bihar. A year later, he was titled Shuja ul-Mulk (Hero of the country), Hassemm ud-Daula (Sword of the state) and Mahabat Jang (Horror in War) and the rank of Paach Hazari Mansabdar (The rank holder of 5000) by Nawab Shuja ud-Din and returned to Azimabad.

Alivardi aspired for larger authority. On 10 April 1740 in the Battle of Giria, he defeated and killed Shuja ud-Din's successor, Sarfaraz Khan. Thus he took control of Bengal and Bihar. Then on 3 March 1741, he defeated Rustam Jang, deputy governor of Orissa and a relative of Sarfaraz Khan, in the Battle of Phulwari. Orissa also came under Alivardi's control. Alivardi Khan defeated a rebellion in Orissa led by Mirza Baqer Khan, and invading Orissa a second time, he subdued the Barha Sayyids with great difficulty, and installed a brave warrior Shaikh Masum as governor.

== Reign ==
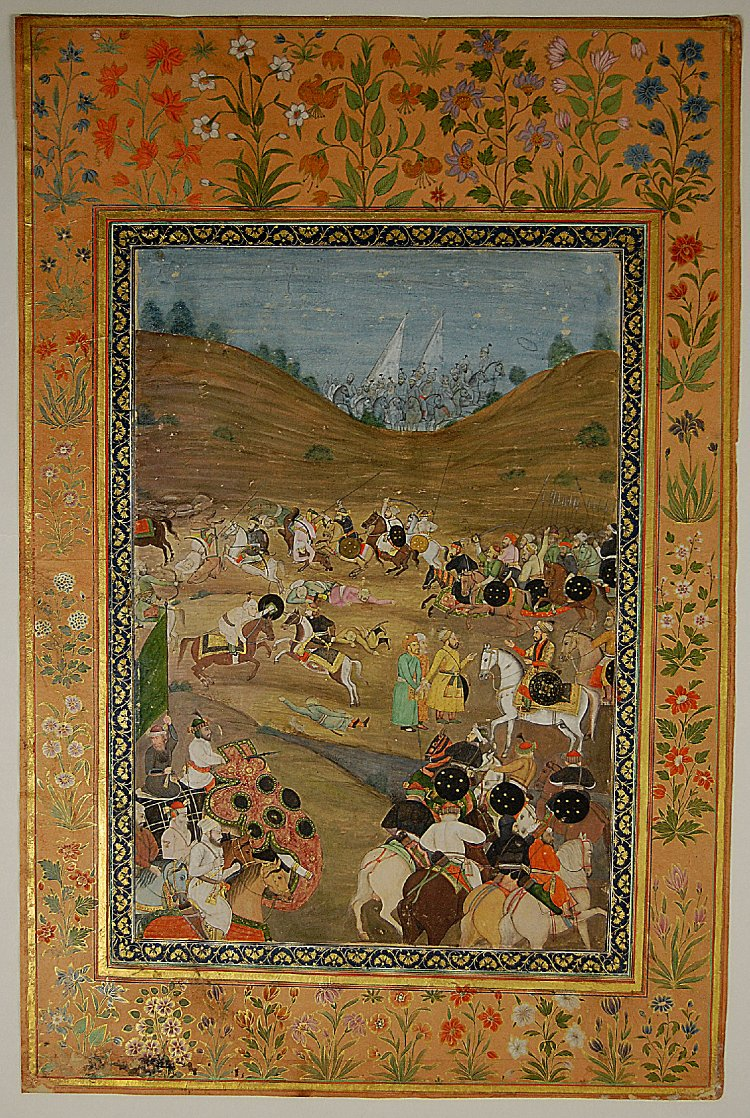
Capture of two prisoners at an important battle by Aliverdi Khan

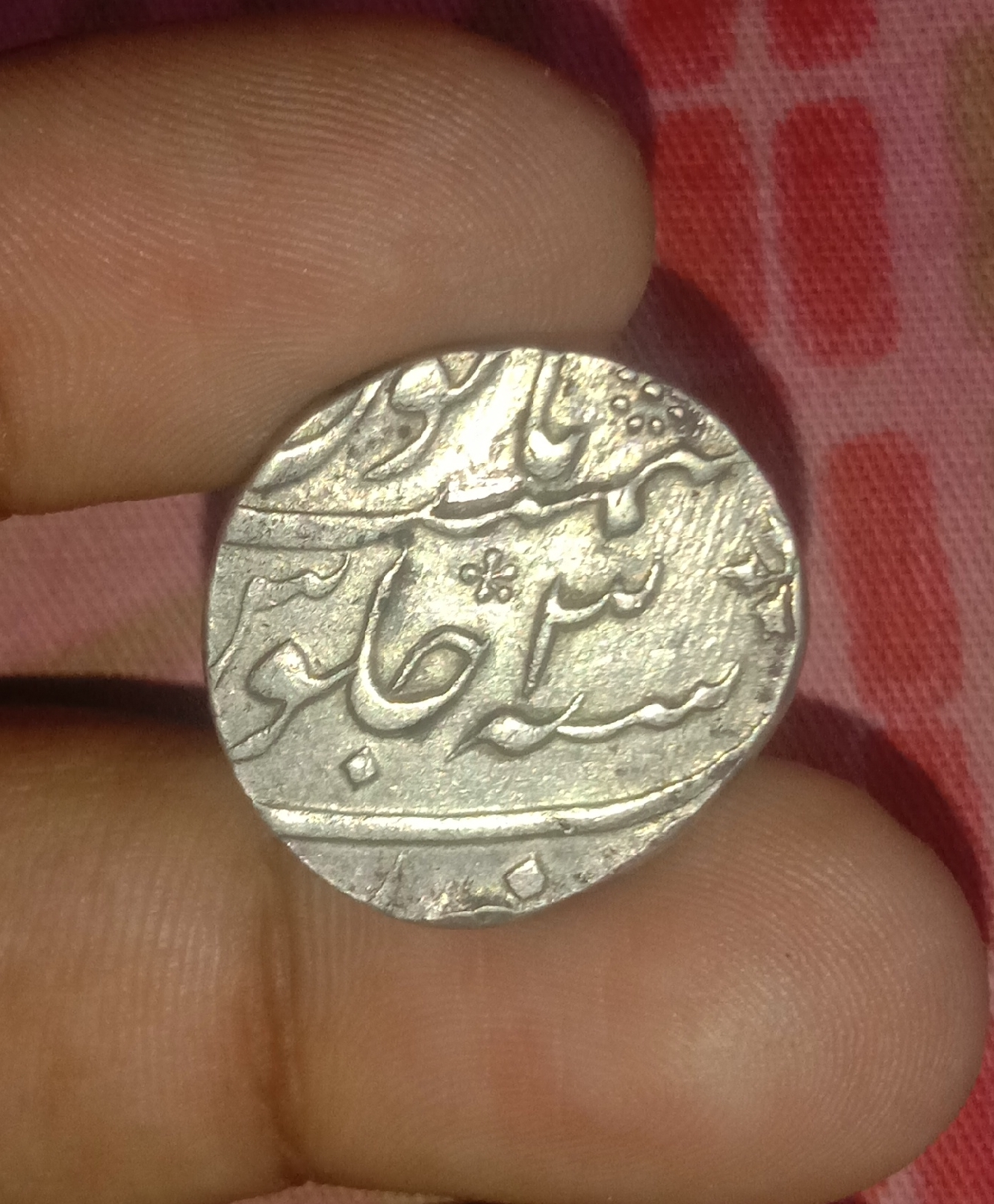
Silver Rupee struck during the tenure of Alivardi Khan as Nawab of Bengal, in Murshidabad mint, in the name of Mughal emperor Ahmad Shah Bahadur, with his regnal year 3 (RY3) in Persian Julus Formula, AD 1751.

Immediately after his usurpation of power, Alivardi had his takeover legitimized by the Mughal Emperor Muhammad Shah and resumed the policies of Murshid Quli Khan. He also chose Faujdars from various regions such as Patna, Dacca and Orissa.

Since 1742, the Maratha Empire raided Bengal repeatedly, ravaging its territories. Alivardi almost immediately had a long ditch, called the Maratha ditch, dug around Calcutta. Alivardi was a brilliant artillery tactician, though his armies were overrun by the large force of the Marathas from Berar who had arrived to pillage and conquer the territories of Bengal under the command of Raghoji I Bhonsle.

In the year 1747, the Marathas led by Raghoji began to raid, pillage and annex the territories of Alivardi. During the Maratha invasion of Orissa, its Subedar Mir Jafar completely withdrew all forces until the arrival of Alivardi and the Mughal army at the Battle of Burdwan, where Raghoji and his Maratha forces were completely routed. The enraged Alivardi then dismissed the shamed Mir Jafar.

Alivardi's defending armies were overrun in Orissa in the year 1751, despite receiving some assistance from Shuja-ud-Daula. But Orissa was ultimately surrendered to the ravaging Marathas. These Maratha attacks continued until March 1751 when a peace treaty was settled between Alivardi and Raghoji.

In 1750, Alivardi faced a revolt from Siraj ud-Daulah, his daughter's son, who seized Patna. Alivardi forgave him. Alivardi also subdued the revolt of a few unruly Afghans who were trying to separate Bihar from his administration, and chastised the Banjaras who were marauding through Bihar and chased them towards the Terai.

According to some historians, Alivardi Khan's reign of 16 years was mostly engaged in various wars against the Marathas. Towards the end, he turned his attention to rebuilding and restoring Bengal.

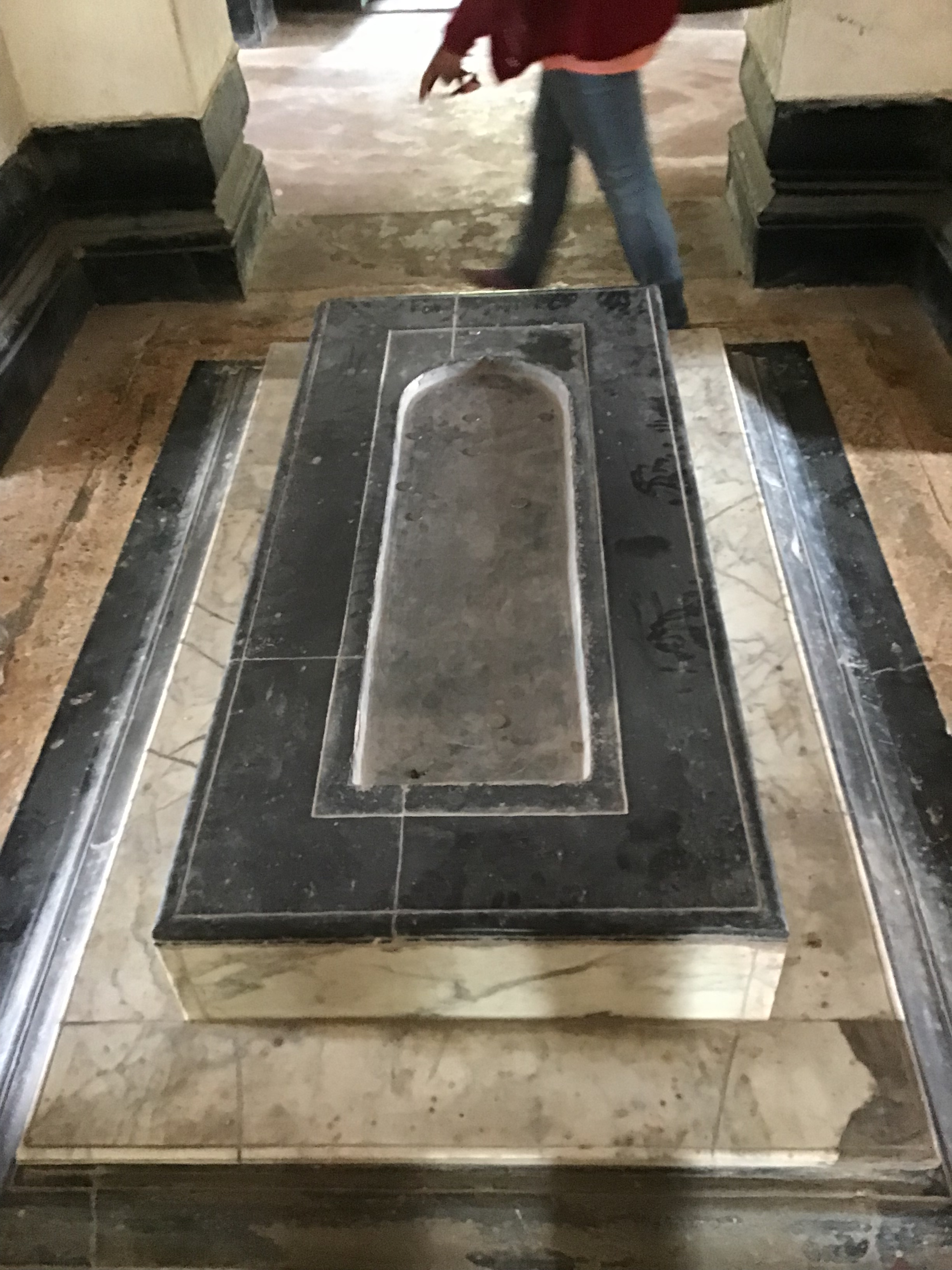
Alivardi Khan's tomb at Khushbagh

He also saved Bengal from the effects of war of succession in Austria through proper vigilance and precautions, unlike south India, which got caught up in it. He maintained a policy of neutrality towards European powers and forbade the British, French and Dutch to have any hostility against each other in his dominion.

== Cultural and musical development ==
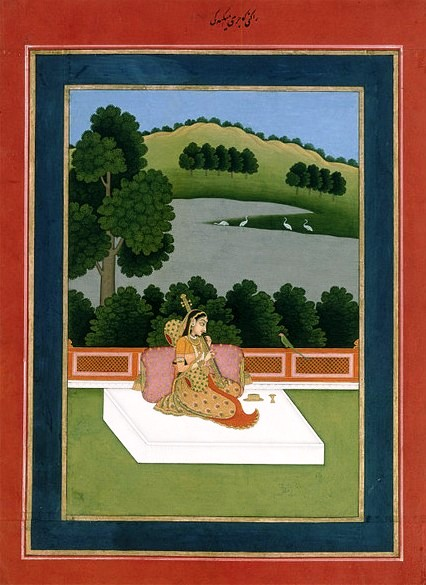
A young woman playing a Veena to a Parakeet, a symbol of her absent lover. Painting in the provincial Mughal style of the Nawab of Bengal.

Alivardi Khan was a patron of various musical instruments such as the Veena and Khol drums. He also patronized many manuscripts of the Shahnameh.

== Death and succession ==
Alivardi Khan died at 5 am on 9 April 1756, aged at least 80. He was buried in Khushbagh next to his mother's grave. He was succeeded by his daughter's son, Siraj-ud-Daula, who was aged 23 at the time.

== Family ==
Unlike many of his contemporaries, Alivardi had only one wife, Sharfunnesa. They had three daughters, of whom at least two married sons of his elder brother Haji Ahmad. Alivardi outlived his sons-in-law and, having had no sons of his own, he was succeeded by his maternal grandson Siraj ud-Daulah. Alivardi's issue are as follows:

- Mehrunnesa (Ghaseti Begum): married Nawazish Muhammad Shahmat Jang, governor of Dhaka (1740–1755)
- Maimuna Begum: according to some historians was married to Sayyid Ahmad Saulat Jang, governor of Purnia (1749–1756), and had one son:
  - Shaukat Jung
- Amina Begum: married Zainuddin Ahmad Haibat Jang, governor of Patna (1740–1747)
  - Siraj ud-Daulah, Nawab of Bengal
  - Ikram ud-Daulah
  - Mirza Mahdi

Alivardi also had a number of half-siblings, including Muhammad Amin Khan and Muhammad Yar Khan, who served under him as a general and governor of Hugli respectively. His half-sister Shah Khanum was the wife of Mir Jafar, who later claimed the throne of Bengal in 1757. The historian Ghulam Hussain Khan was also a relative.

== See also ==
- Nawabs of Bengal
- List of rulers of Bengal
- History of Bengal
- History of India

== Bibliography ==
- Datta, Kalikinkar (1939). Alivardi and His Times. Kolkata: University of Kolkata.

Alivardi Khan Born: Before 10 May 1671 Died: 10 April 1756
Preceded by Sarfaraz Khan	Nawab of Bengal; 29 April 1740 – 9 April 1756	Succeeded by Siraj ud-Daulah
