= Sarfaraz Khan =

Nawab of Bengal from 1739 to 1740

Sarfarāz Khān
- Mīrzā; Motamul ul-Mulk (Guardian of the country); Alā ud-Dawlah (Promoter of the state); Ḥaydar Jang (Lion in War)
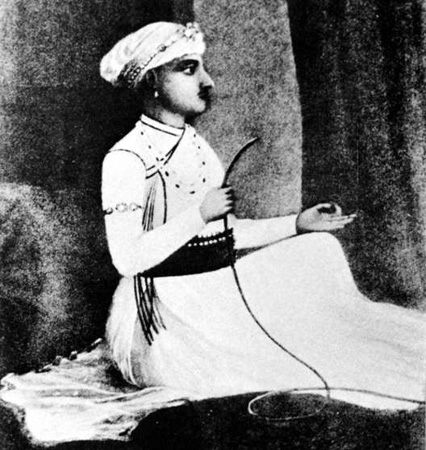

Nawab of Bengal, Bihar and Orissa
- Reign: 13 March 1739 – 29 April 1740
- Coronation: 13 March 1739
- Predecessor: Shuja-ud-Din Muhammad Khan
- Successor: Alivardi Khan

Naib Nazim of Dhaka
- Tenure: 1734–1739
- Predecessor: Mīrzā Lutfullāh Tabrīzī
- Successor: Abdul Fattāh Khān
- Born: Mirza Asadullah c. 1700; Deccan Plateau, Mughal Empire
- Died: 29 April 1740 (aged 39–40); Murshidabad, Bengal, Mughal Empire
- Burial: Khushbagh, West Bengal, India
- Spouse: Sitara Begum, Roshni Begum
- Issue: Sons: Mīrza Hafizullah Khan (d. November 1771); Mīrza Mughal; Mīrza Amanī; Mīrza Burhan (d. April 1795); Shukrullah Khan (b. 29 April 1740) and 5 Daughters.
- Dynasty: Nāṣirī
- Father: Shuja-ud-Din Muhammad Khan
- Mother: Zinat-un-nisa Begum
- Religion: Shia Islam

Sarfarāz Khān (Mirza Asadullāh; c. 1700 – 29 April 1740), was the Nawab of Bengal from 1739 until his death in 1740.

== Early life and succession ==
Born Mirza Asadullah, sometime after 1700, Sarfaraz Khan Dakhni was the son of Shuja-ud-Din Muhammad Khan by his wife Zinat-un-nisa Begum.

Shujauddin appointed Sarfaraz as the Naib Nazim of Bihar. In 1734, Sarfaraz Khan succeeded his cousin, Mirza Lutfullah Tabrizi, as the Naib Nazim of Jahangirnagar (Dhaka). Instead of moving to Dhaka, Khan appointed Ghalib Ali Khan and Jaswant Rai as the Diwan. During his tenure, the city of Jahangirnagar saw rapid economic growth through agriculture and trade - the greatest since the time of Governor Shaista Khan.

== Reign ==
Known to be an extremely pious, religious and moderate ruler he left the administration into the hands of his Nazims and Naib Nazims. Religious matters was his priority. This neglect in administrative matters resulted the gradual rise of Alivardi Khan the Nazim of Azimabad (Patna).

Sarfaraz Khan had become the Diwan of Bengal for sometime early into the reign of his father Shuja-ud-Din Muhammad Khan and later became the Nazim of Jahangir Nagar (Dhaka). Sarfaraz, however, never lived in Dhaka and handed the administration over to his adviser Syed Galib Ali Khan.

A gradual rise of influence of high-ranking court officials was seen at his court during his reign. Notable among them were Ray-Rayan, Alam Chand, the Dewan of his father, nor to Jagat Seth or Haji Ahmed, his two other ministers, the latter, men of great abilities and influence, who, together with the Ray-Rayan, had the absolute direction of affairs in the late reign.

Among these were Haji Lutfullah, Mardan Ali Khan, Mir Murtaza, and others, who, long incensed against Haji Ahmed, depreciated his character everywhere, and insulted him with taunting expressions. These incensed noblemen, intent on giving vent to their enmity and hatred against Haji Ahmed, caused caricatures to be drawn of him, and eventually effected in Sarfaraz Khan's mind a total alienation of regard towards him. Haji Ahmed was accordingly removed from the office of the Dewan, which he had held ever since Shuja-ud-Din Muhammad Khan's accession; and the office was now bestowed upon Mir Murtaza. The viceroy wanted, in addition, to deprive Ataullah Khan, son-in-law of the Haji, of the military command of Rajmahal, to give it to his own son-in-law Hassan Muhammad Khan.

=== Intrigues in his Durbar ===
Haji Ahmed dreading the influence of his numerous enemies, endeavoured to gain strength to oppose them; he therefore wrote to his brother Alivardi Khan, magnifying trifles exceedingly in the representation. Haji Ahmed started persuading the new viceroy to disband great part of his forces, and otherwise to retrench his expenses. Advice so consonant to his feelings was adopted without hesitation; but while he listened to the counsel of Haji Ahmed to effect reduction, he allowed the arrest of Haji Ahmed's two sons Zain-ud-Din Ahmed Khan, who was on the road from Patna (Azimabad), and Ahmed Khan, who had just arrived from his command of Rangpur.

Sarfaraz Khan now set on foot an inquiry into the management of the public revenue of Azimabad (Patna), and recalled the troops that had been placed by his father under Alivardi Khan, and for whom during many years they had conceived an attachment. On their seeming to hesitate about being removed, he resumed the grant of land which his father Shuja bestowed on them. All these acts were minutely reported by Haji Ahmed, and assiduously transmitted to his brother Alivardi Khan with the usual exaggeration; and to give more weight to his own assertions, he used to superadd the testimony of his son Ahmed Khan, who on such occasions submitted to the influence of paternal authority.

=== Conspiracy of Alivardi Khan ===
Alivardi Khan, daily informed of these events, resolved to avail himself of his acquaintance and connection with his friend Ishaq Khan, at the court of Dehli, a nobleman who was now in complete possession of the Mughal Emperor's ear. He wrote to him a secret letter, in which he requested to have the patents of the three provinces transferred to himself, under promise of sending to court a present of a crore (ten million) of rupees, besides the whole of Sarfaraz Khan's wealth. To effect this, he required an imperial commission directed to himself, empowering him to wrest the three provinces out of the hands of the present viceroy, Sarfaraz Khan. After having dispatched these letters, he gave out that he intended marching against the zamindars of Bhojpur, and under that pretence he mustered his troops, which he always kept in constant readiness. At the same time, he had the art to give Sarfaraz Khan public notice of his project, though he in reality waited ready to avail himself of the first opportunity to effect his true purpose.

At length, ten months after Nadir-shah's departure for Persia, and just thirteen months after Shuja-ud-Din Muhammad Khan's decease, he received the imperial commission, drawn up in the style he had requested. Being now resolved on marching against Sarfaraz Khan, he wrote secretly to Jagat Seth and Fateh Chand, that on a certain day he would commence his march. In March 1740; Alivardi Khan, set out for Murshidabad, on the context of expedition to Bhojpur, and encamped at some distance from the city of Patna.

Alivardi Khan in a message to Sarfaraz Khan suggested that he was not marching on him but was arriving to pay homage to the Nawab. Initially satisfied, Sarfaraz Khan eventually decided to march on the head of his army and arrived at the town of Comrah on 9 April 1740. Alivardi in the interim, secured the Teliagarhi pass and camped at Rajmahal. The Nawab's army was being led by a seasoned general, Ghaus Khan and Ray-Rayan, Alam Chand also accompanied. The rebel army was being led by Alivardi Khan with Nandalal and Nawazish Muhammad Khan as his deputies.

They opposing armies marched on to Giria (Battle of Giria), a village on the banks of the river Bhagirathi for a showdown on 26 April 1740.

== Defeat, death and succession ==
Sarfaraz Khan was defeated and killed in the Battle of Giria on the banks of the river Bhagirathi, by the incumbent Alivardi Khan, the Nazim of Azimabad (Patna). The battle was short yet bloody and intense, given the "loyalty standards" of the time. The outcome was decided early by Sarfaraz Khan falling to a bullet during the battle. The remnants of his army continued to put up a brave resistance until they were overcome by the more superior forces.

The primary cause for this debacle was that Sarfaraz never saw what was coming in the form of Alivardi Khan, and did not take precautionary measures in time. Sarfaraz was more concerned of the "bigger threat" Nadir Shah who was vandalising Delhi and Punjab. Nadir had in fact written to Sarfaraz which aggravated matters further. And therefore, he is best described as a mild-mannered person, who neither had the opportunity nor the exceptional merit required to leave a "mark" on history on such troubled times and was consigned to the footnotes of history.

Sarfaraz Khan's reign lasted a little over 13 months. The Nasiri Dynasty of Murshid Quli Khan ended with his death. He had five sons and five daughters who never made it to the doors of power.

According to the Archaeological Survey of India, the Tomb of Nawab Sarfraz Khan at Naginabagh is a State Protected Monument (Item no S-WB-80).

== See also ==
- List of rulers of Bengal
- History of Bengal
- History of Bangladesh
- History of India
- Shia Islam in India

Sarfaraz Khan Born: Before 1700 Died: April 29, 1740
Preceded by Murshid Quli Khan (before 1727) and Shuja-ud-Din Muhammad Khan (before 1739)	Nawab of Bengal; 13 March 1739 – April 1740	Succeeded by Shuja-ud-Din Muhammad Khan (after 1727) and Alivardi Khan (after 1740)
