= Nashipur =

- Village
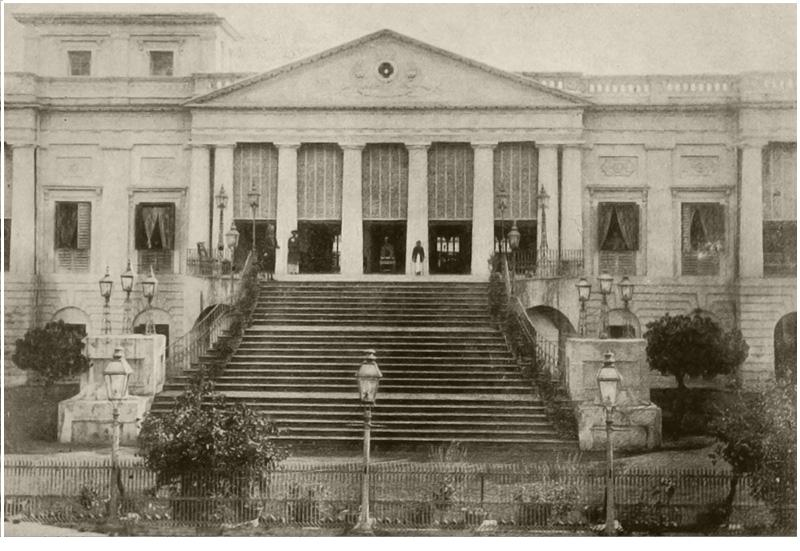
- The front façade of the Nashipur Royal Palace during British Raj

- Location in West Bengal, India Nashipur (India)
- Coordinates: 24°13′0″N 88°16′30″E
- Country: India
- State: West Bengal
- District: Murshidabad

Languages
  - Official: Bengali, English
- Time zone: UTC+5:30 (IST)
- PIN: 742160
- Nearest city: Murshidabad

Nashipur is a village in the Murshidabad-Jiaganj CD block in the Lalbag subdivision of Murshidabad district in West Bengal, India.

== Geography ==
Cities, towns and locations in the Lalbag and Domkal subdivisions, Murshidabad district
M: municipal town, CT: census town, R: rural/ urban centre, H: historical place
Owing to space constraints in the small map, the actual locations in a larger map may vary slightly

=== Location ===
Nashipur is located at 24°13′0″N 88°16′30″E.

The Namak Haram Deorhi, Jafarganj Cemetery, House of Jagat Seth, Kathgola Palace and Tomb of Azimunissa Begum are all located nearby. One can reach the temple town of Rani Bhavani at Baranagar, on the other side of the Bhagirathi, by country boat from Ajimganj.

Note: The map alongside presents some of the notable locations in the subdivisions. All places marked in the map are linked in the larger full screen map.

== Nashipur picture gallery ==
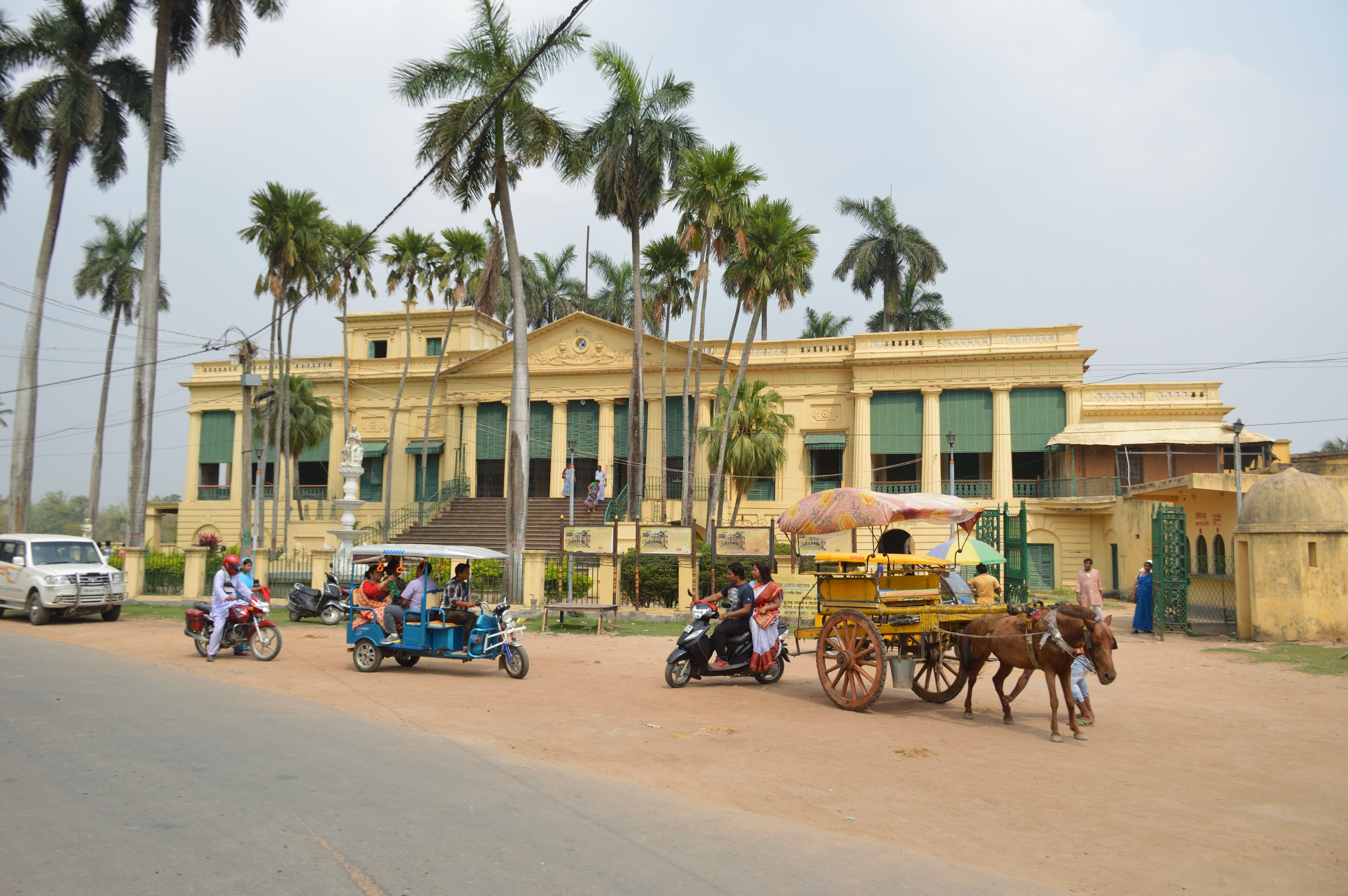
Nashipur Palace

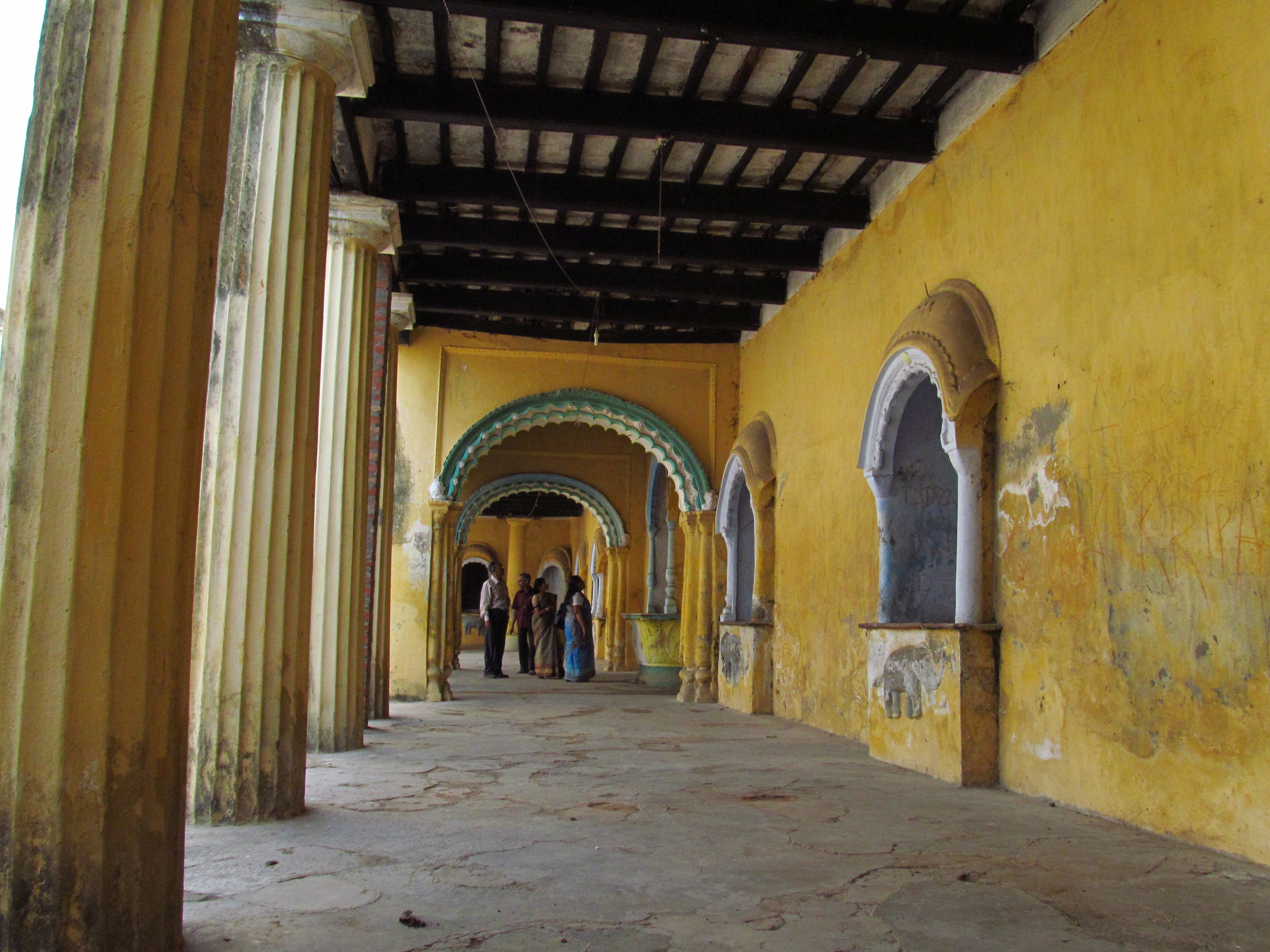
Corridor

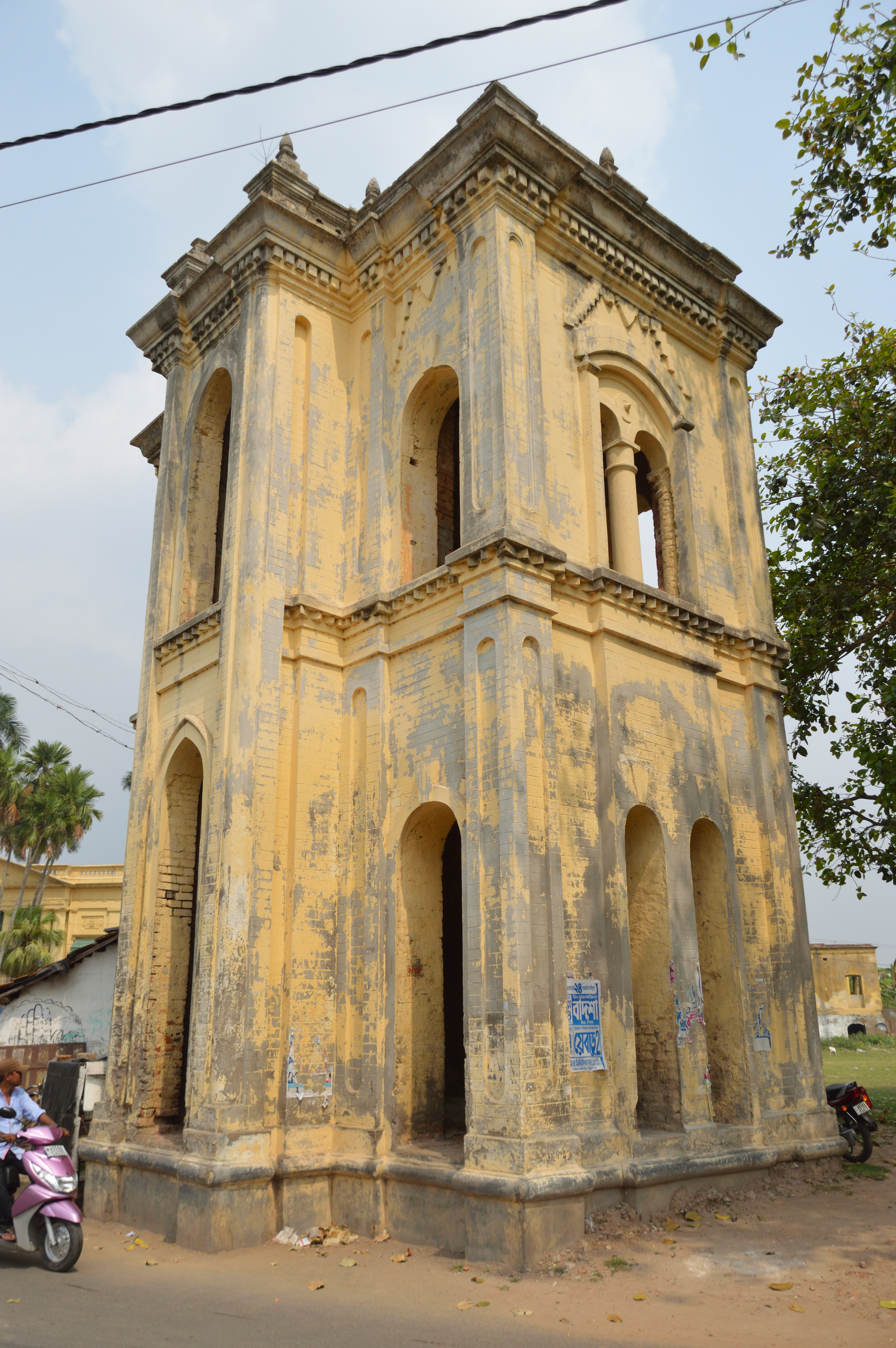
Nahabatkhana

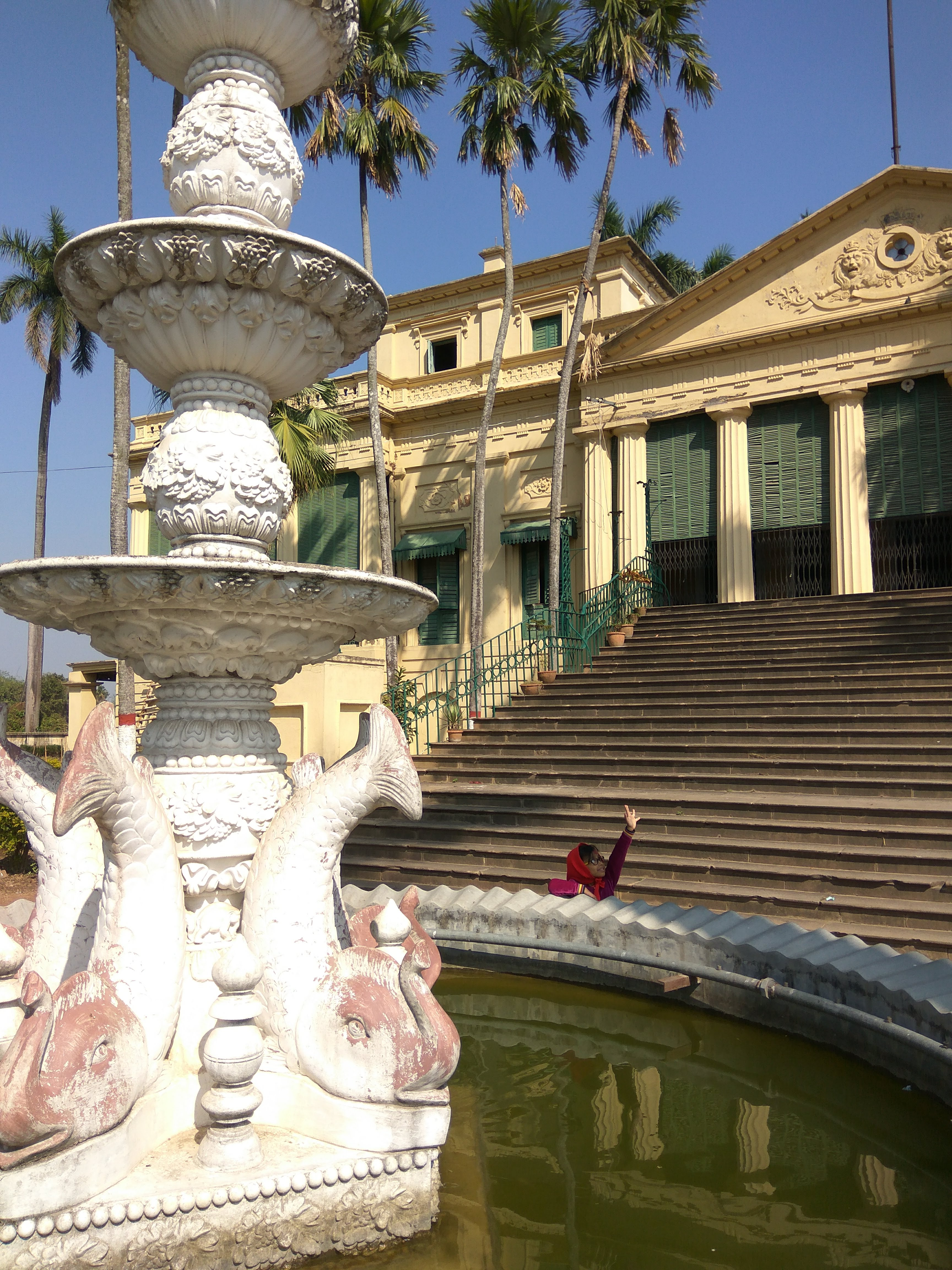
The grand entrance

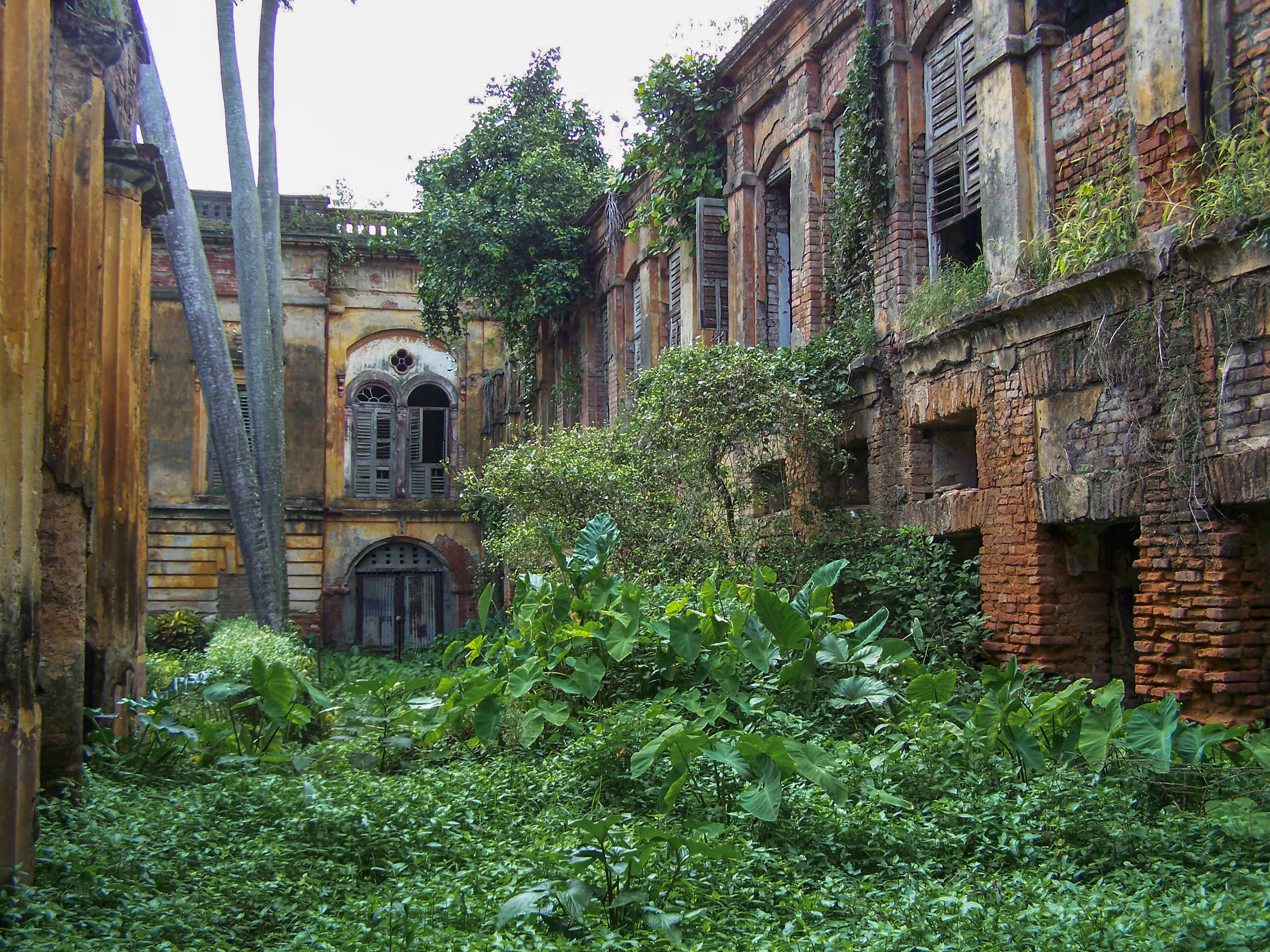
Ruins of old palace

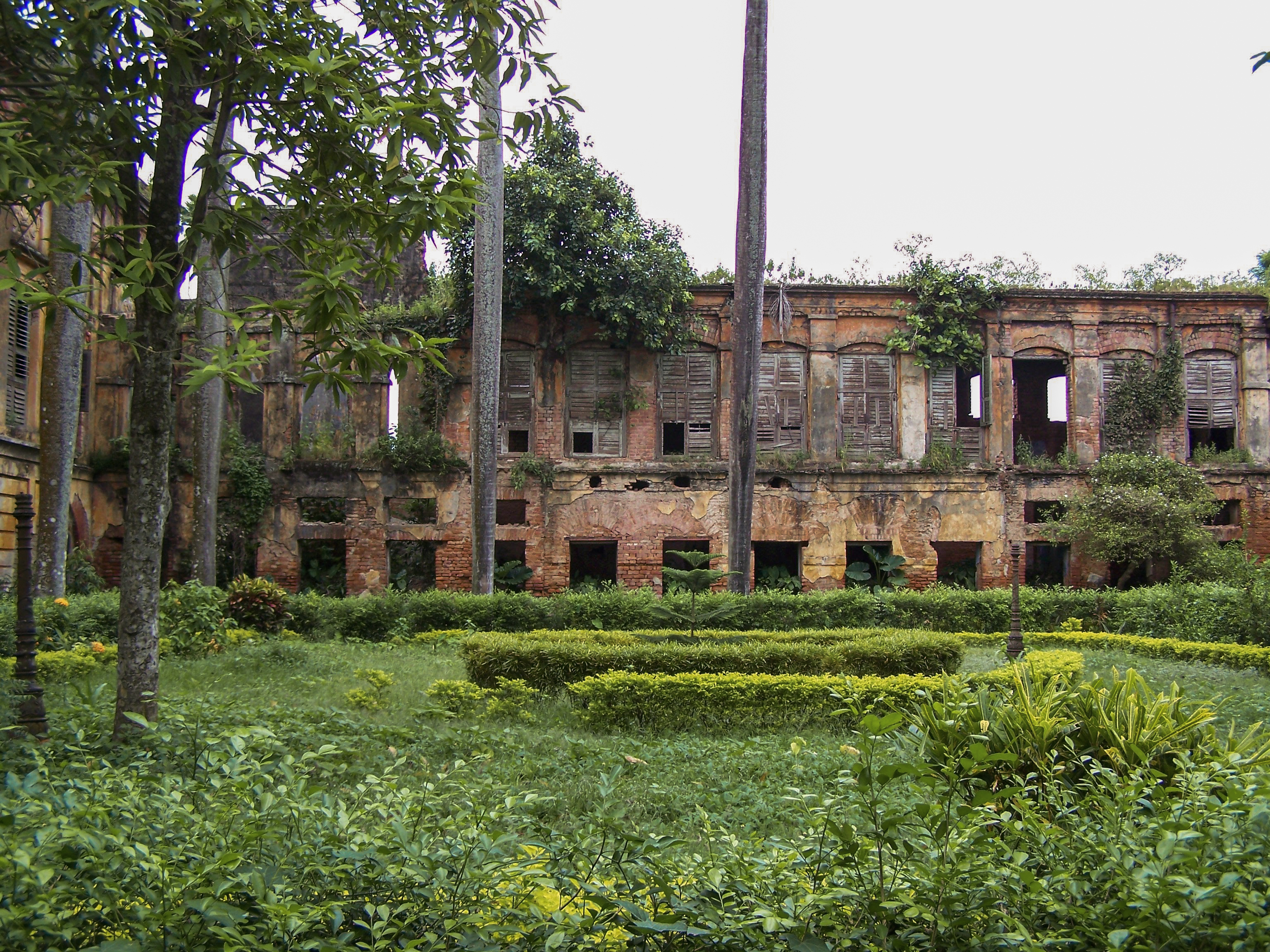
Ruins of old palace

== Nashipur Akhara picture gallery ==
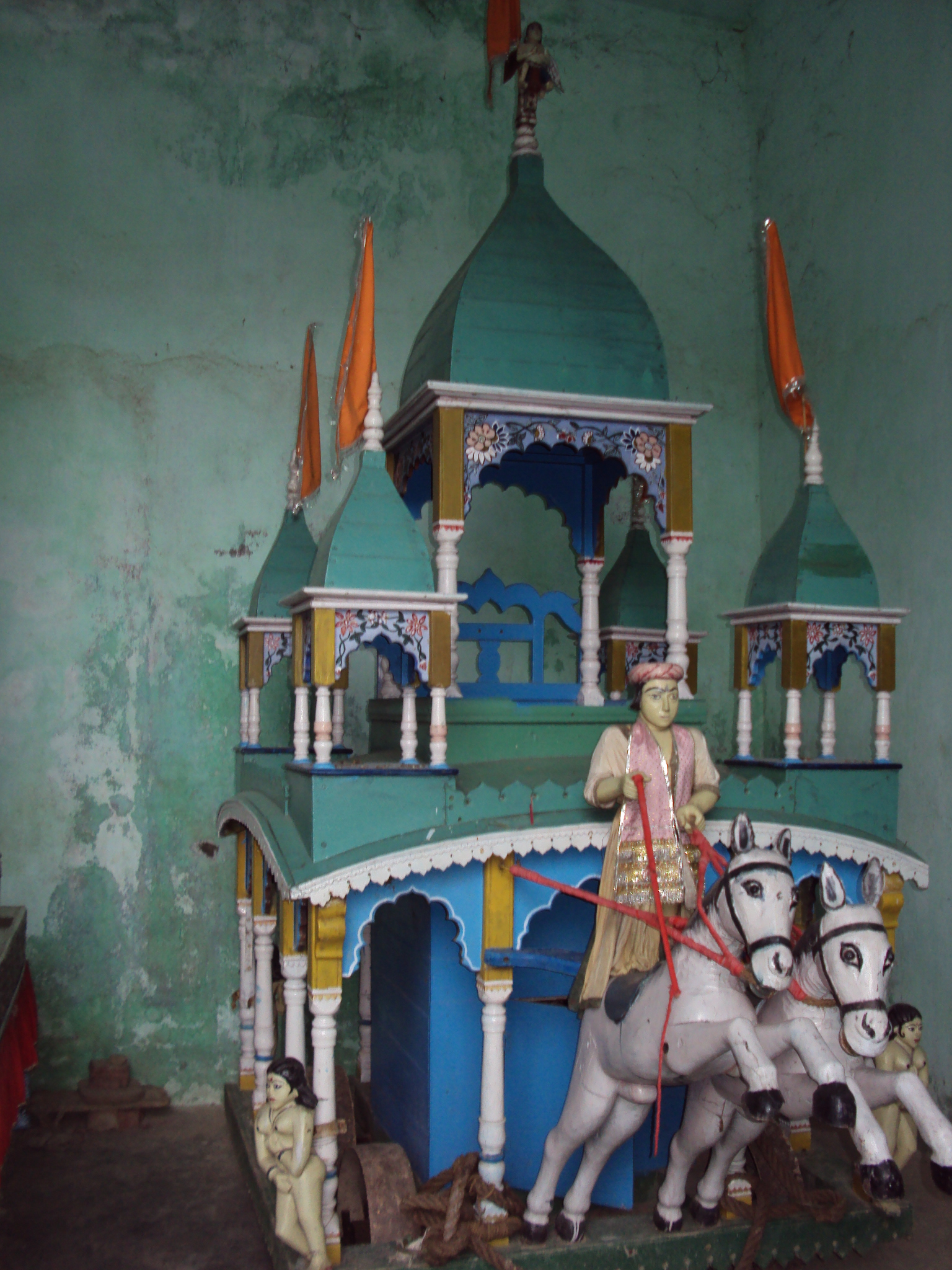
Wooden ratha

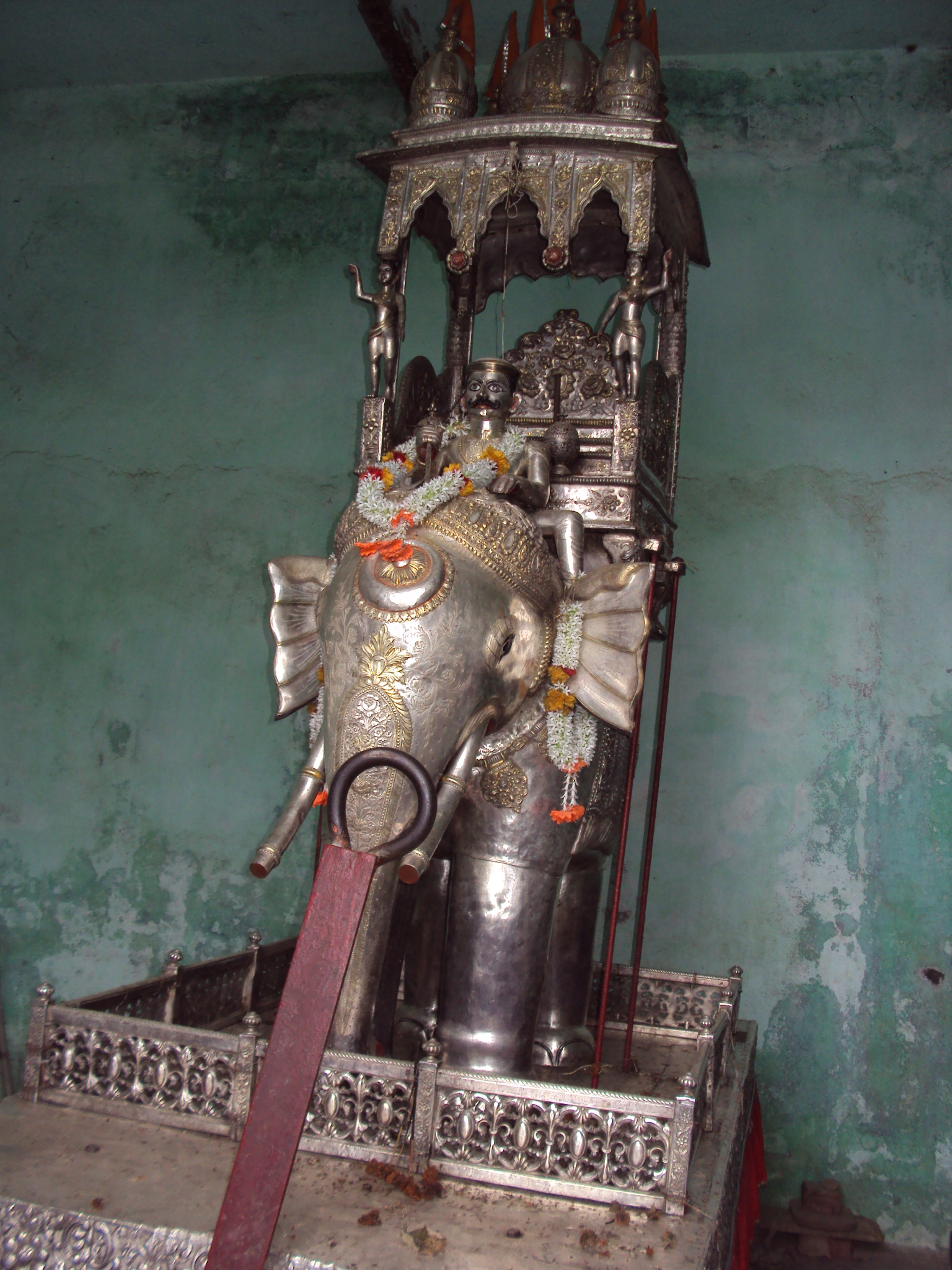
Silver hawda

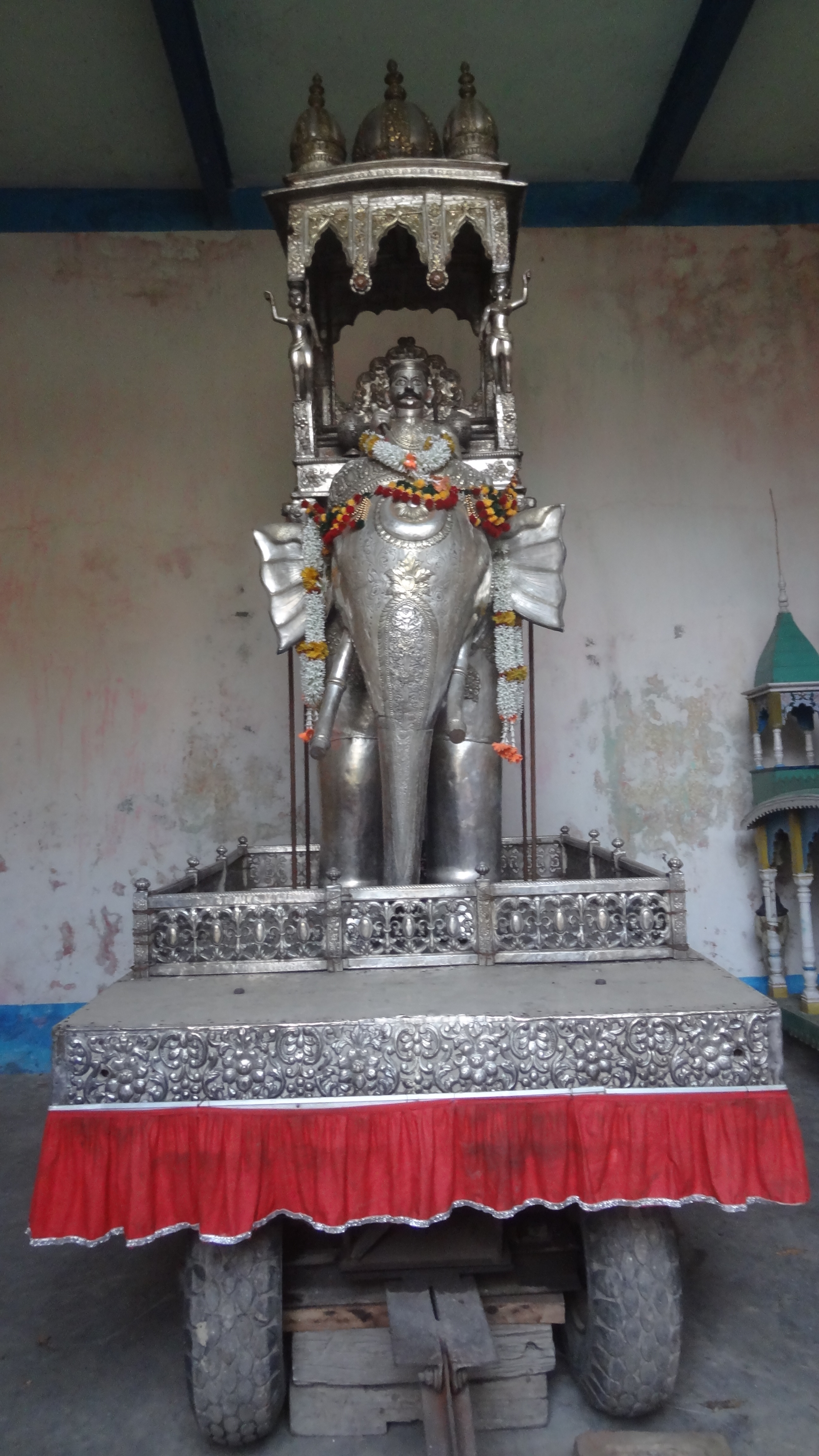
Silver and gold chariot

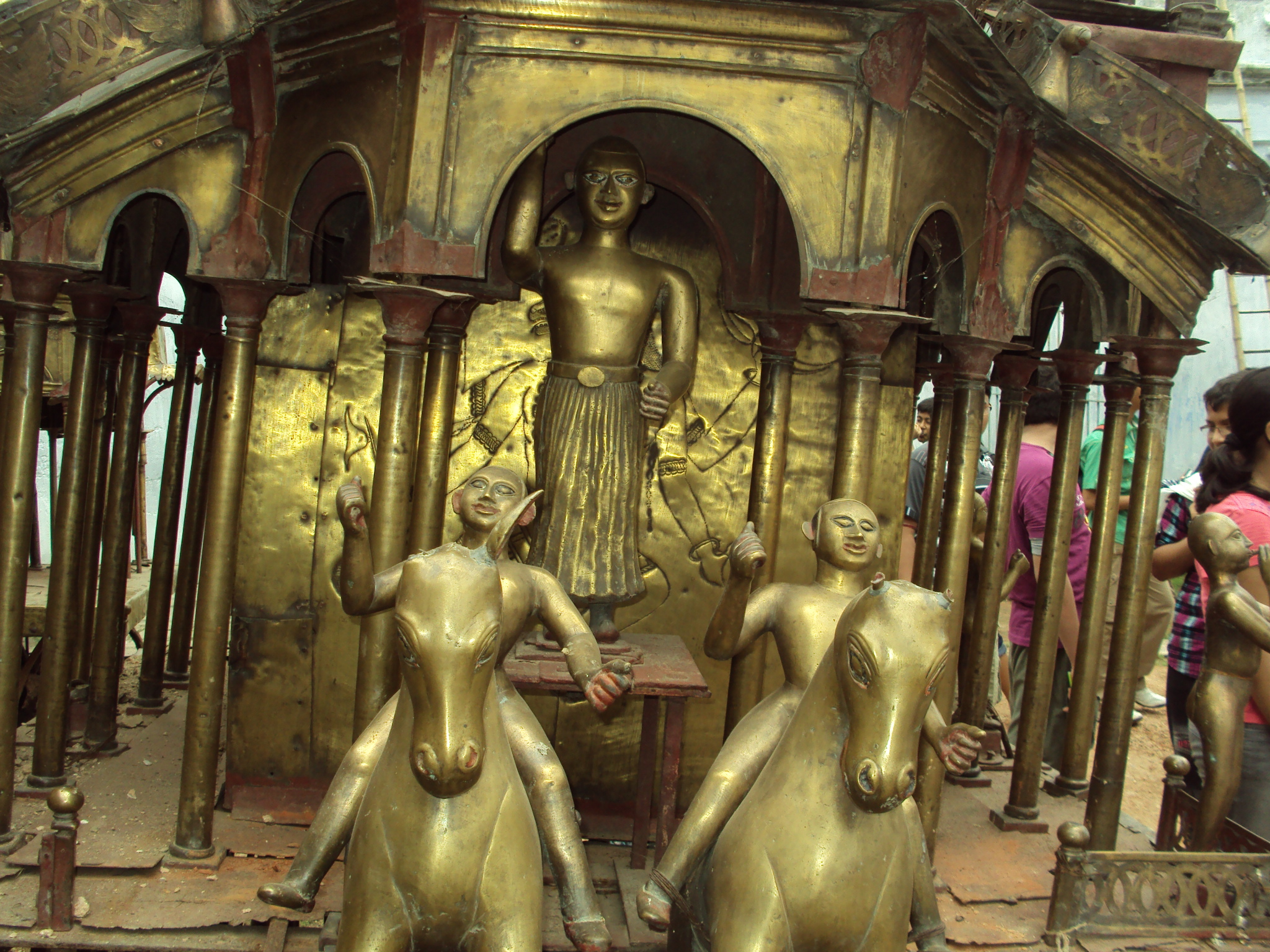
Brass ratha

== See also ==
Murshidabad travel guide from Wikivoyage

- Nashipur Rail Bridge
