= Kathgola Palace =

Historical building in India

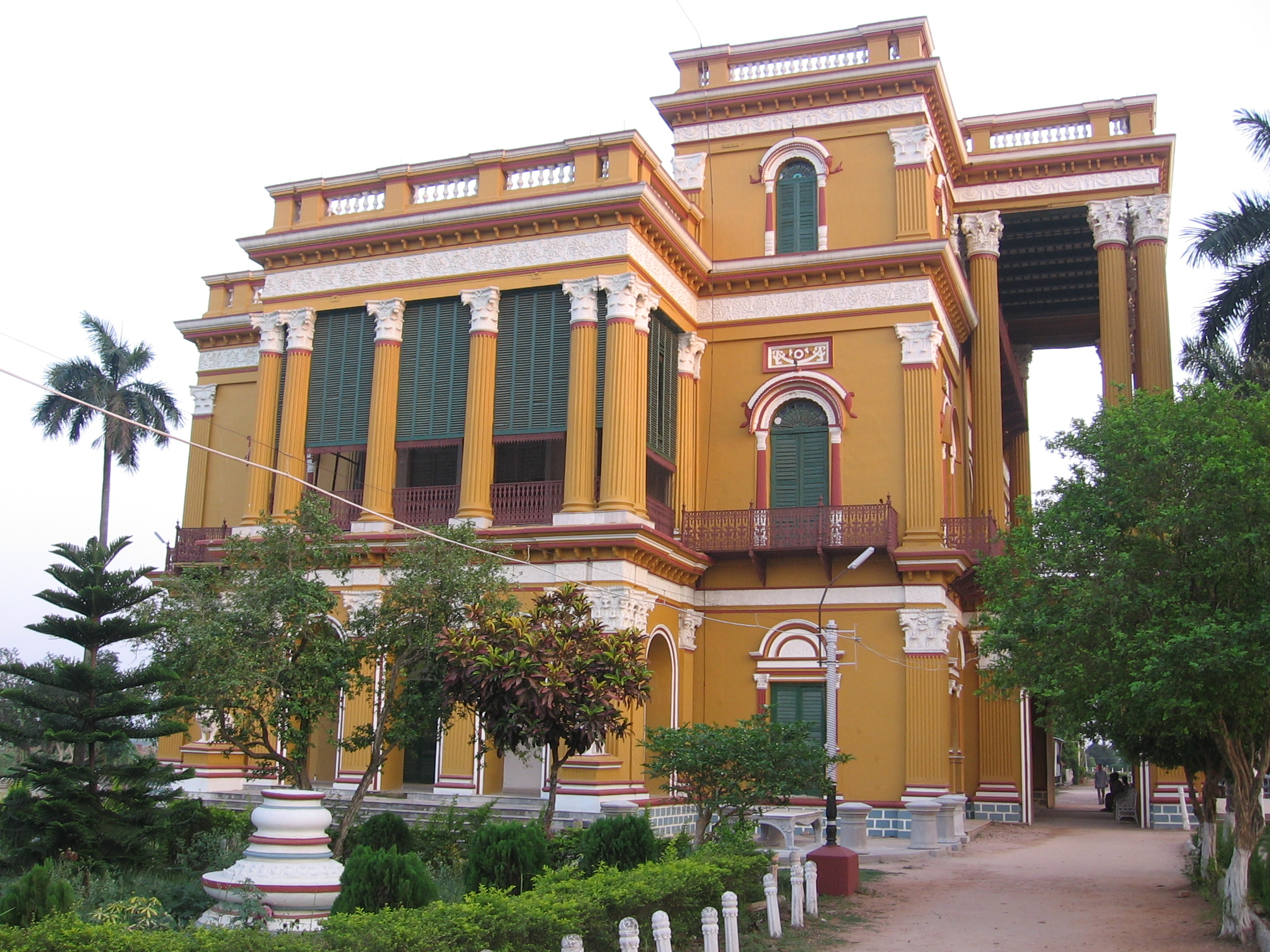
- Kathgola Palace
- Interactive map of the Kathgola Palace area

General information
- Type: Complex
- Location: Kathgola, Murshidabad-Jiaganj CD block, Murshidabad district
- Coordinates: 24.2076°N 88.26723°E
- Completed: 1873
- Owner: Dugar family

Kathgola Palace is a historical building belonging to the Dugar family at Kathgola in the Murshidabad-Jiaganj CD block of Murshidabad district. It now houses a museum.

== Etymology ==
The place was earlier called Kath Golap Garden because Wood Roses, called Kath Golap in Bengali, used to grow in abundance in the garden. The name got distorted later.

== Geography ==
Murshidabad
F: facility, H: historical site
Owing to space constraints in the small map, the actual locations in a larger map may vary slightly

=== Location ===
Kathgola Palace is located at 24.2076°N 88.26723°E.

The Namak Haram Deorhi, Jafarganj Cemetery, Nashipur Rajbari, House of Jagat Seth and Tomb of Azimunissa Begum are all located nearby. One can reach the temple town of Rani Bhavani at Baranagar, on the other side of the Bhagirathi, by country boat from Ajimganj.

Note: The map alongside presents some of the notable locations in Murshidabad city. Most of the places marked in the map are linked in the larger full screen map. A few, without pages yet, remain unmarked. The map has a scale. It will help viewers to find out the distances.

== The palace and garden ==
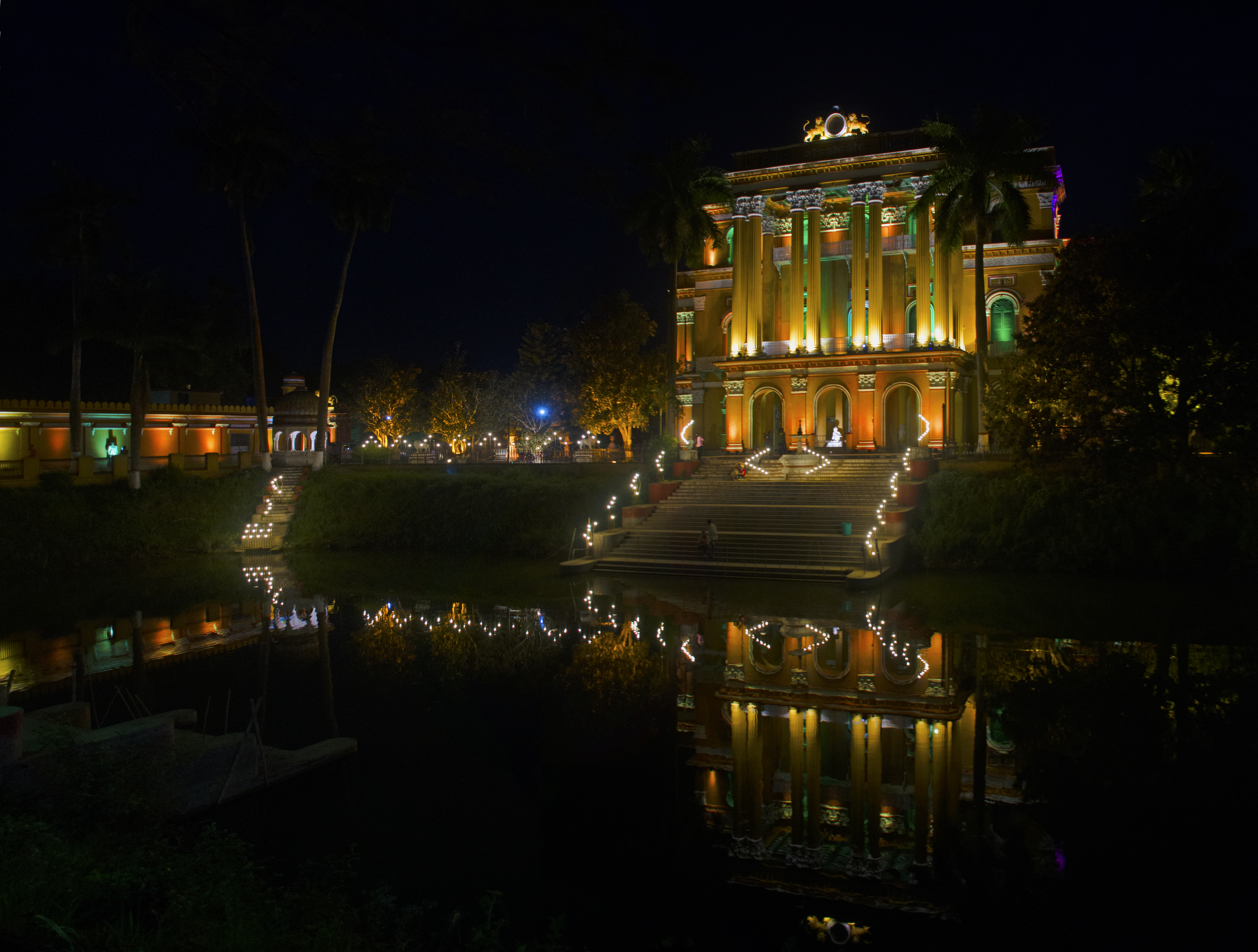
Illuminated Katgola Palace at night during the Murshidabad Heritage Festival

Murshidabad was at its peak in the early 19th century, and the opportunities of trade and banking attracted many Marwari Jains to go and settle there. Azimganj and Jiaganj became the nucleus of the Marwari Jain community. In the course of time, they acquired immense wealth and they built many Jain temples. The principal families were the Dugars, the Dudhorias, the Nahars, the Kotharis and the Nowlakhas. Although, many of them shifted their base to Kolkata, with the ascendancy of the British, the palatial buildings and temples they built are still there.

A popular attraction on a customary tour of Murshidabad is the Kathgola Palace and Garden, built by Dhanpat Singh Dugar and Lakshmipat Singh Dugar in 1873. The Dugars hired a French architect to renovate a part of their palace. A Bengali architect was also involved. "This palace is a perfect blend of art and architecture and connoisseurs of true art will get a taste of both." Victorian lions and Michael Angelo statues have changed the place. The Adinath temple is famous and there are several Jain and Hindu temples. There are 17 images of Jain tirthankaras. There was a zoo inside. "The palace has been converted to a museum and showcases magnificent chandeliers, mirrors, furniture, etc".

== Kathgola picture gallery ==
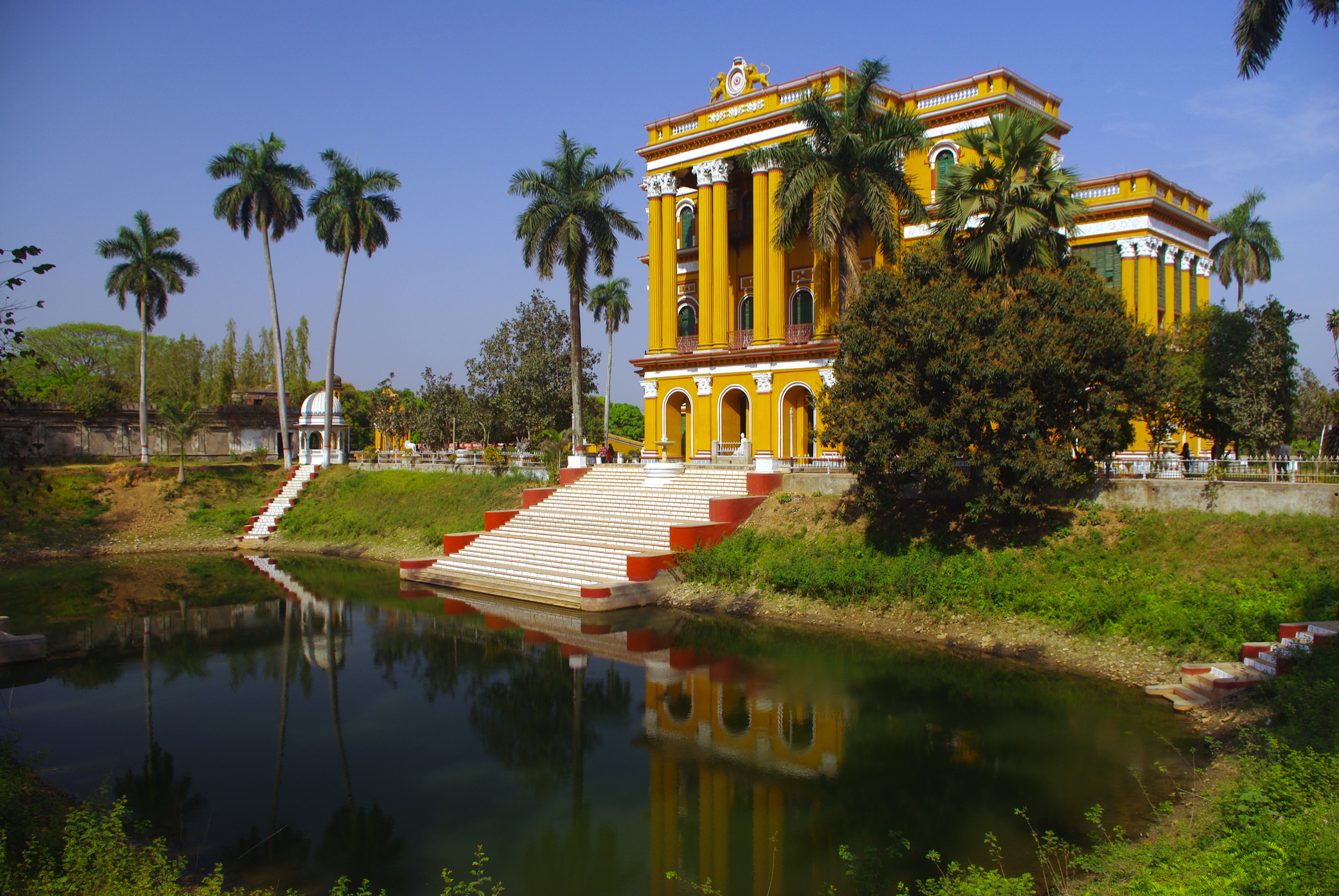
Kathgola Palace

Gateway – Kathgola Gardens

Kathgola Palace

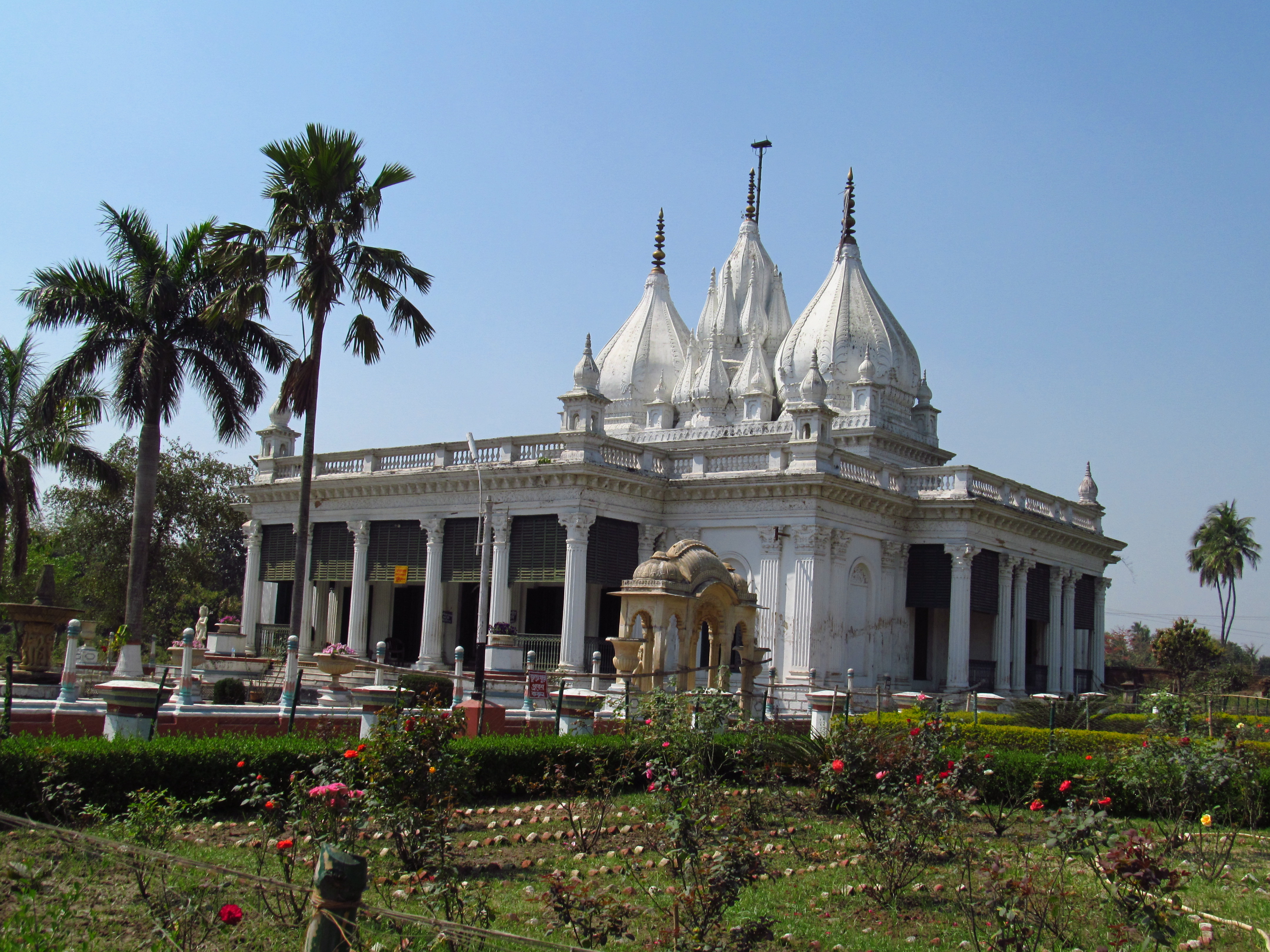
Adinath Temple
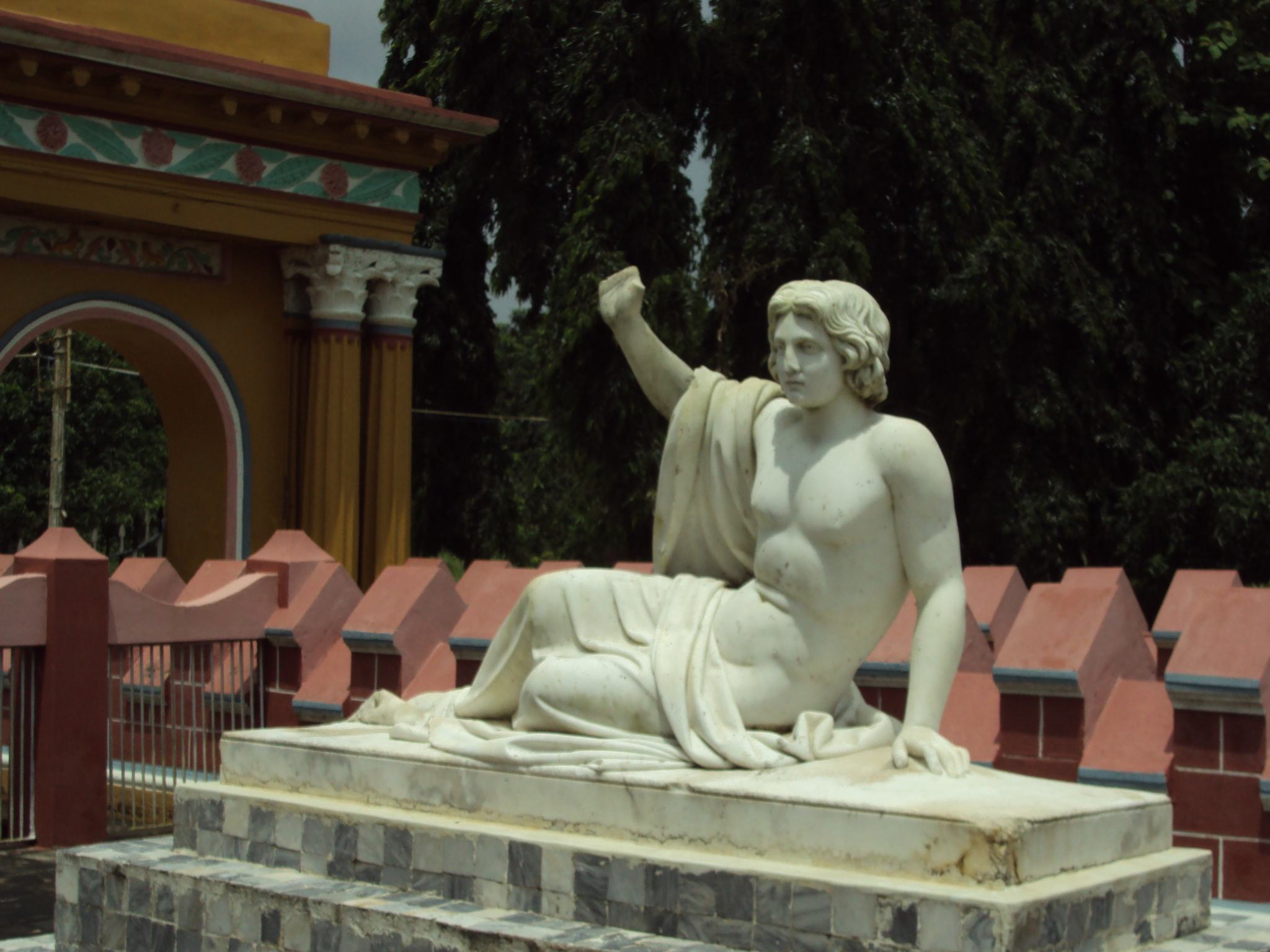
Michaelangelo

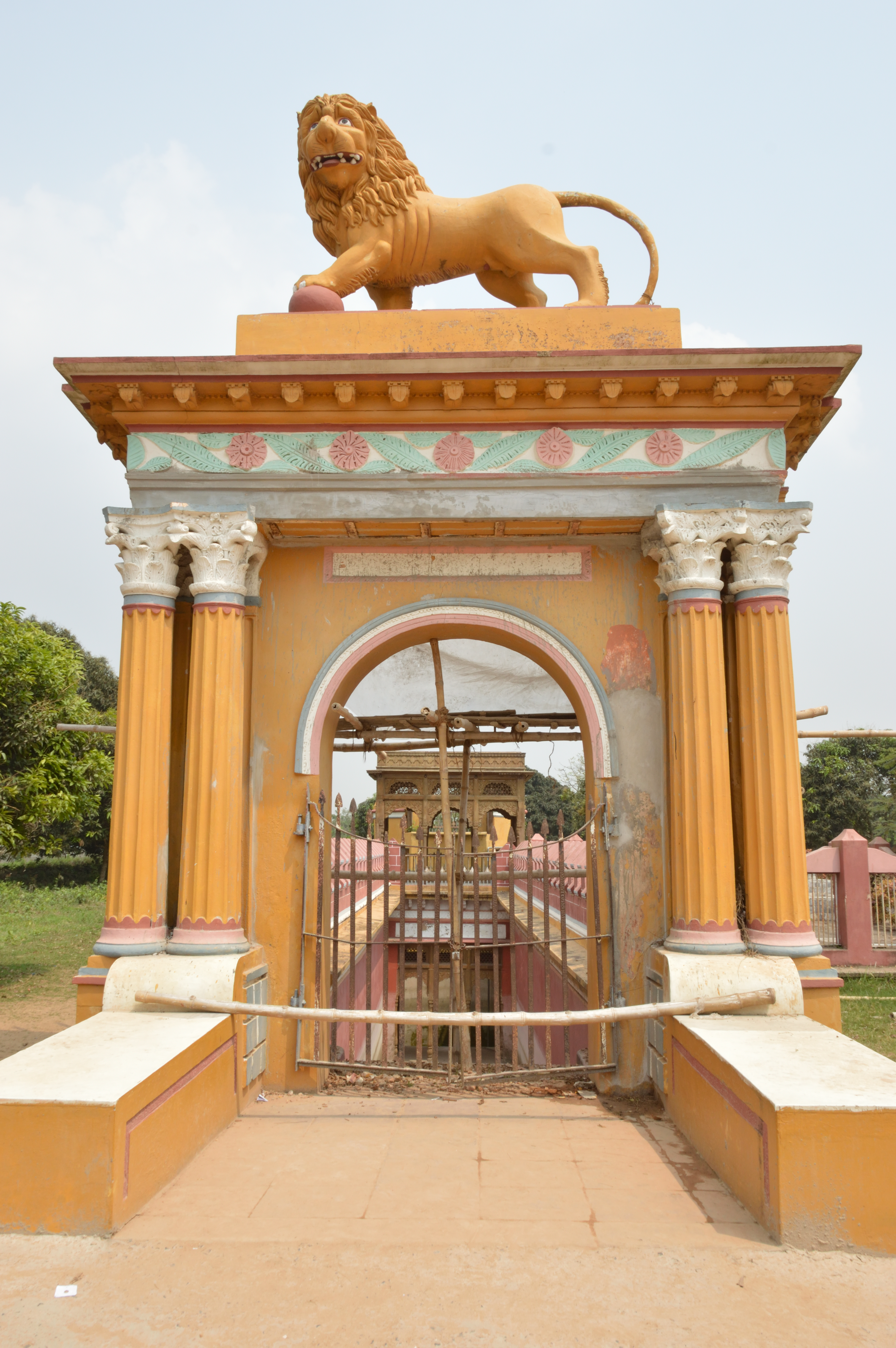
Stelwell Gate – Kathgola Garden

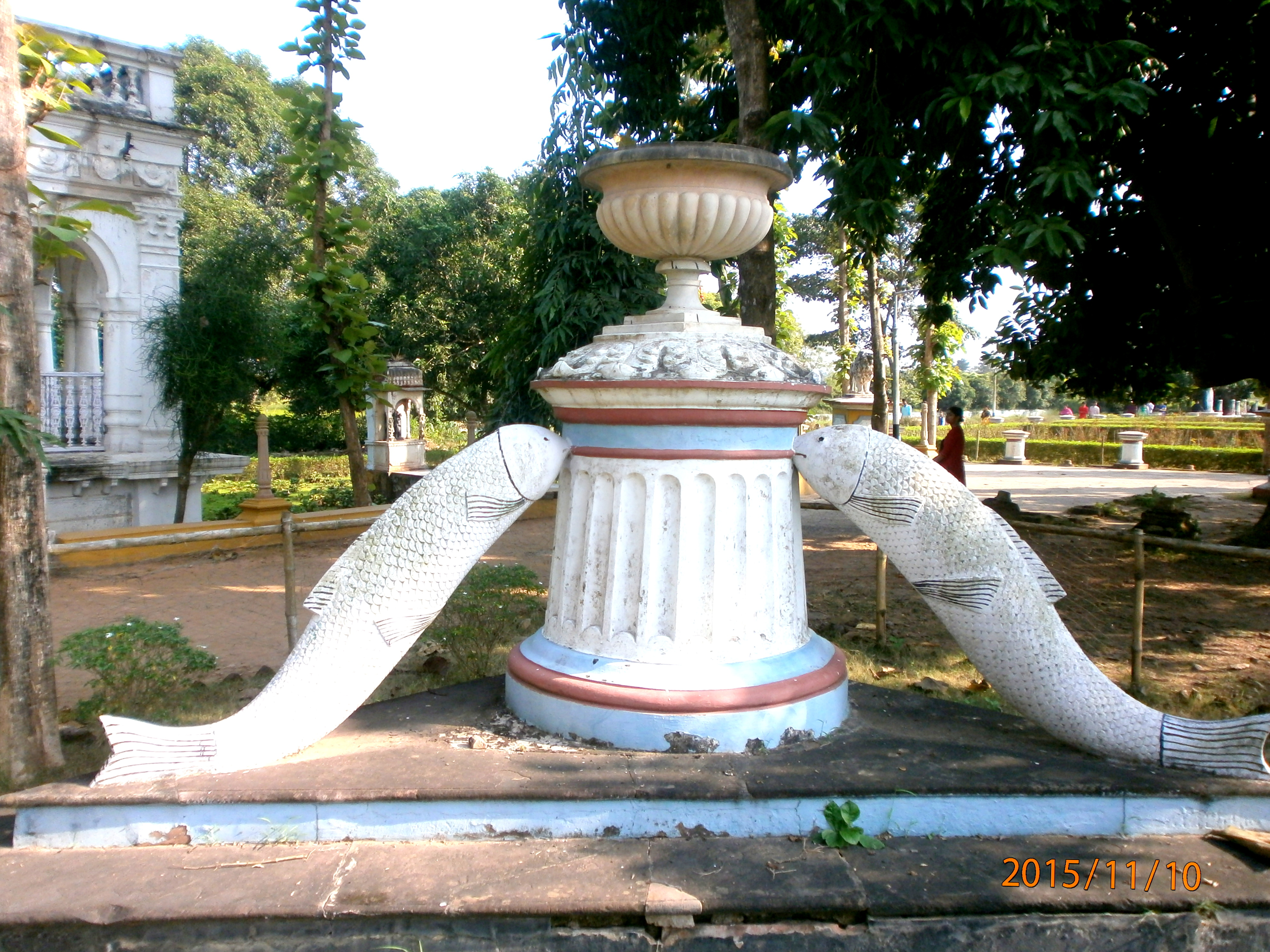
Garden decoration

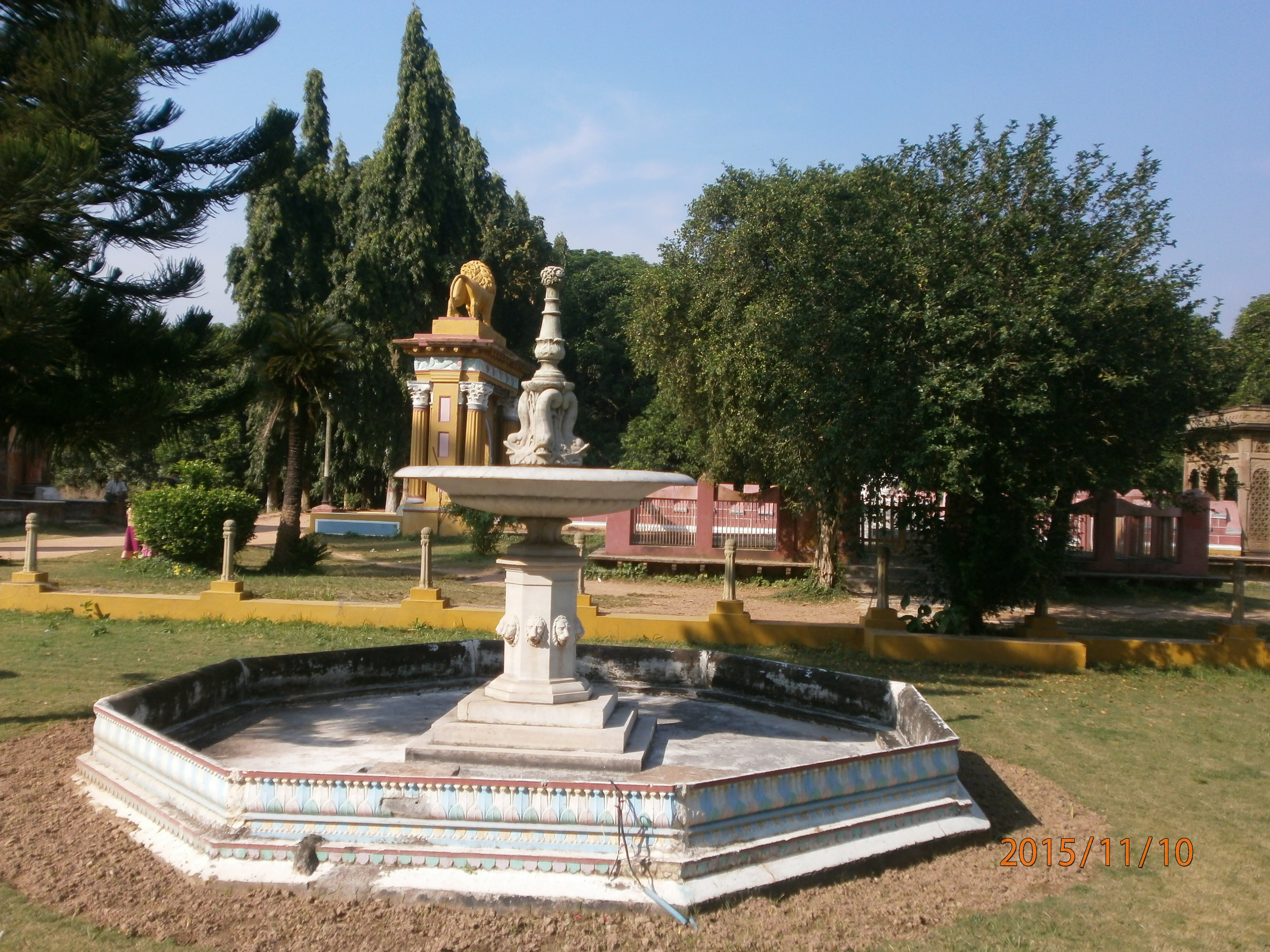
Garden decoration

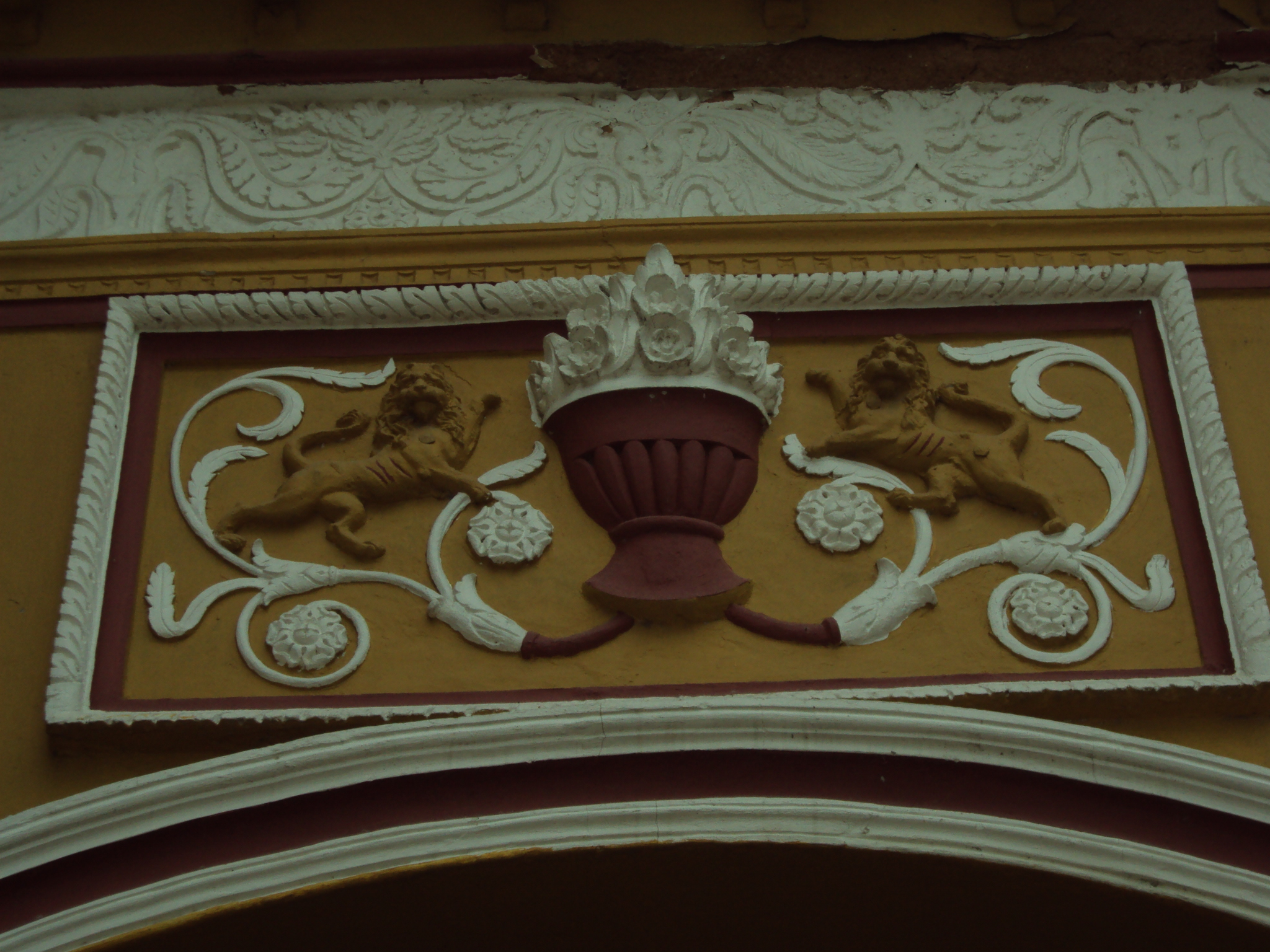
A traditional design in the palace

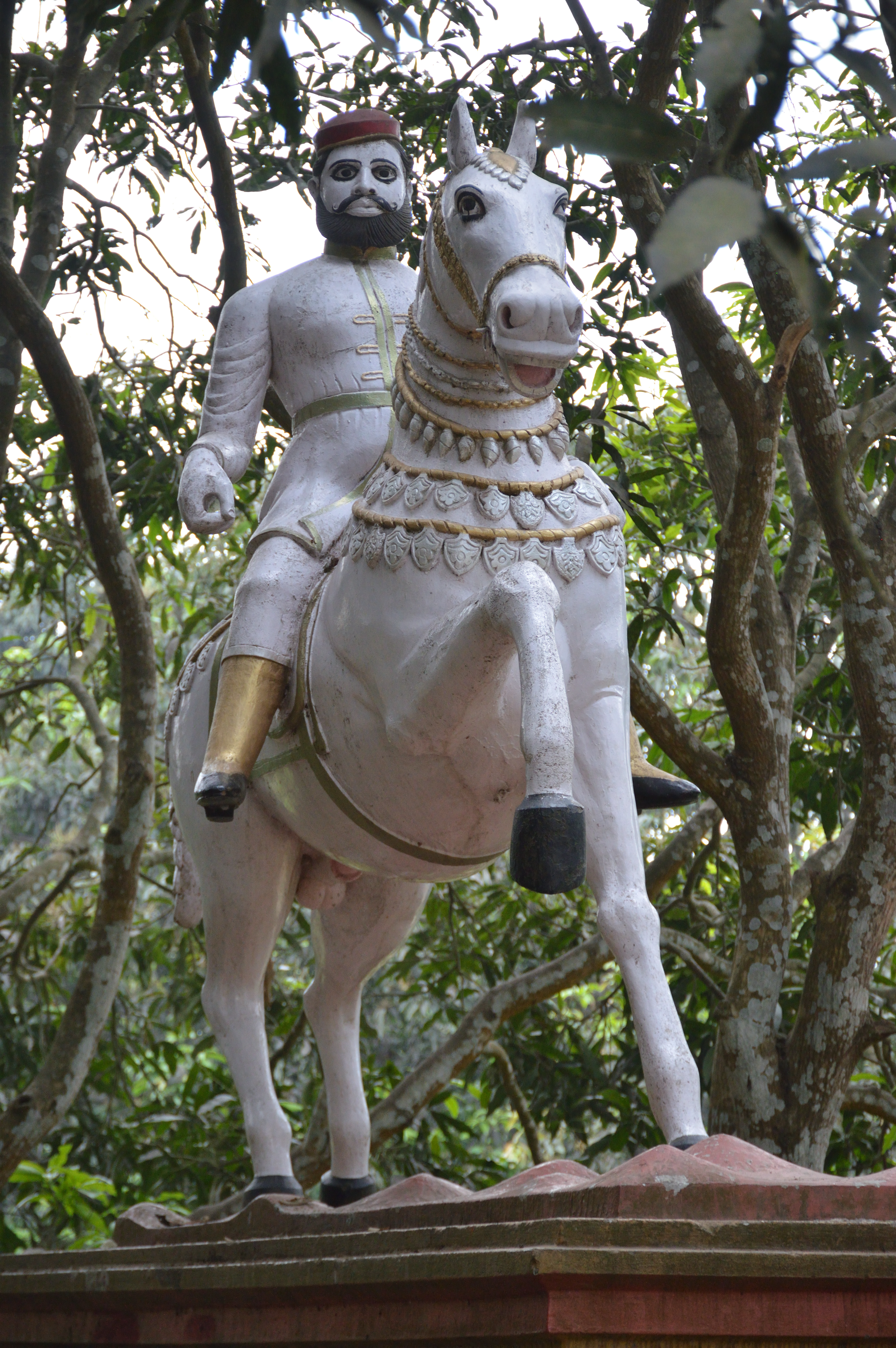
Equestrian statue

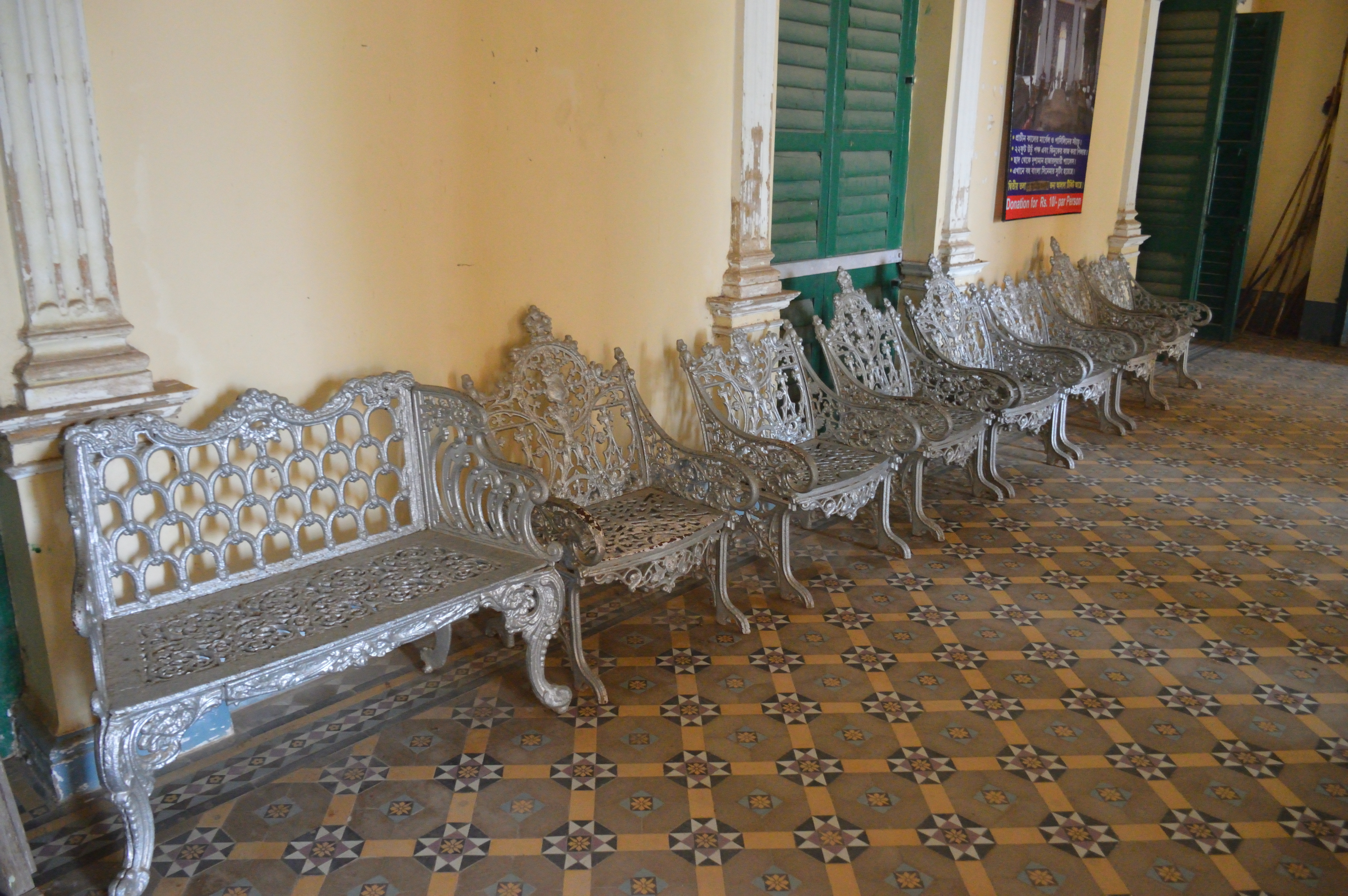
Cast iron chairs in the palace

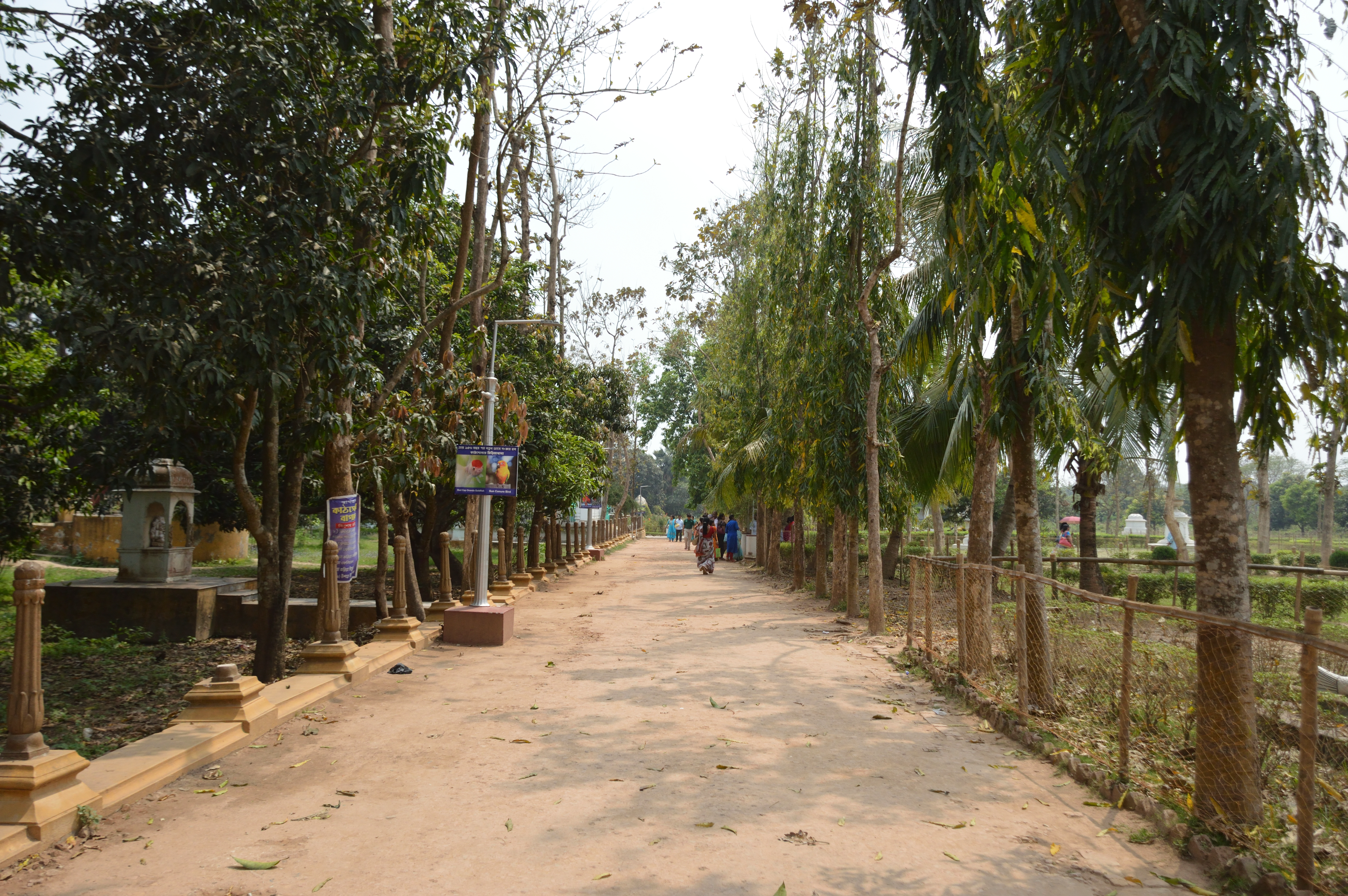
Garden road

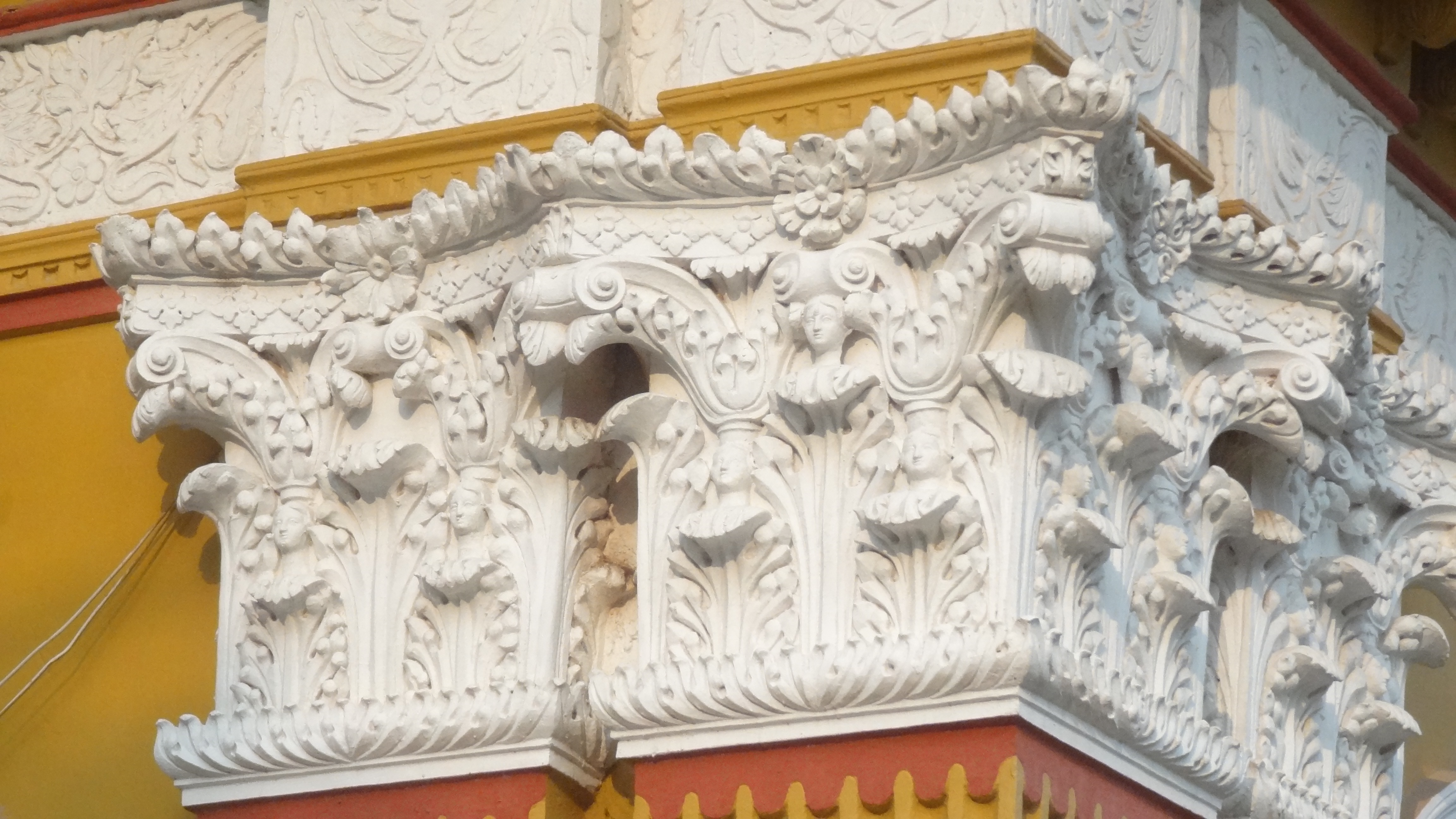
Pillar decoration

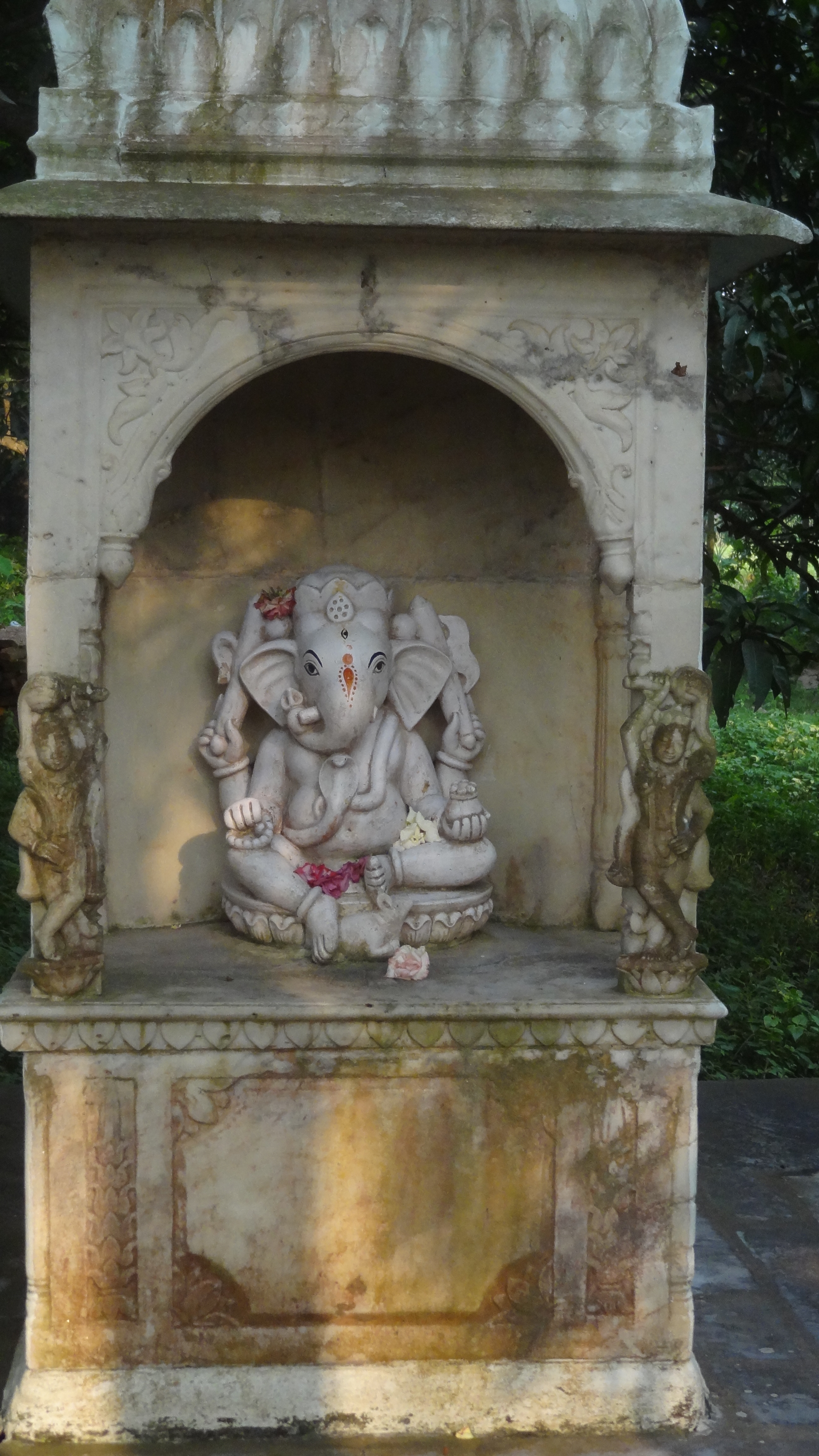
Ganesha in the palace

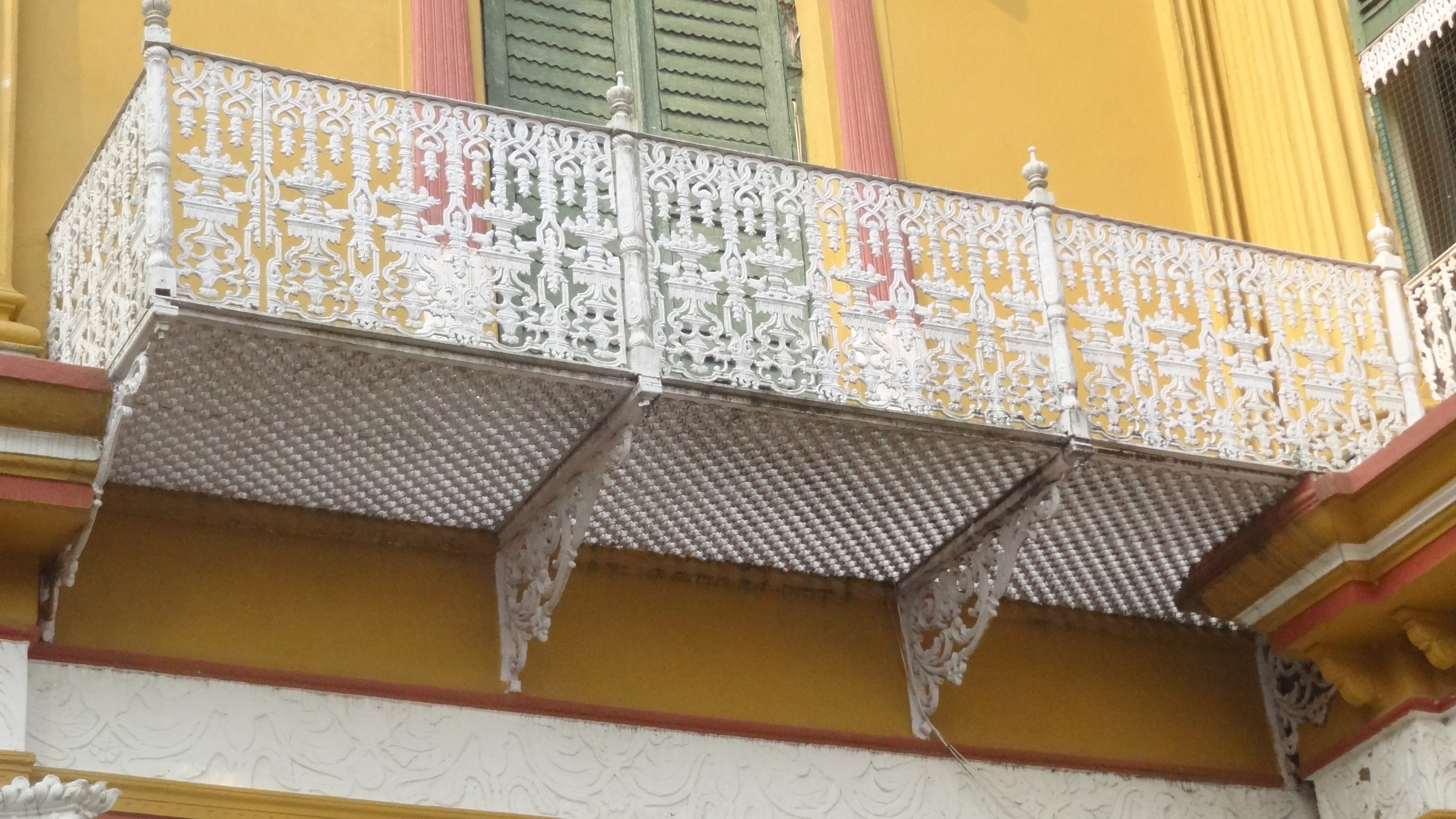
Verandah railing

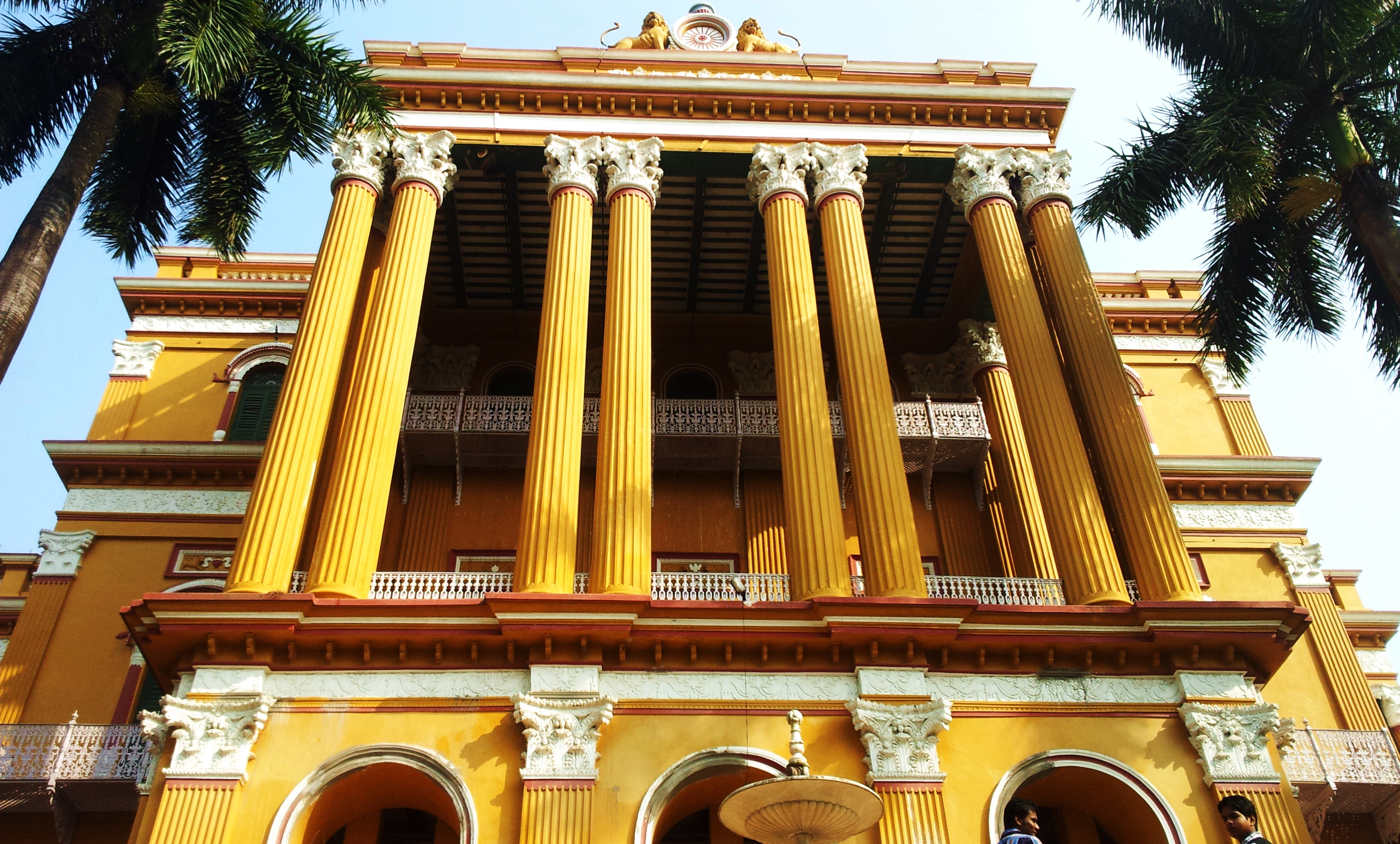
Kathgola Palace

== See also ==
- Nawabs of Bengal and Murshidabad
