= Namak Haram Deorhi =

Former palace in Murshidabad, India

Jafragunj Deohri
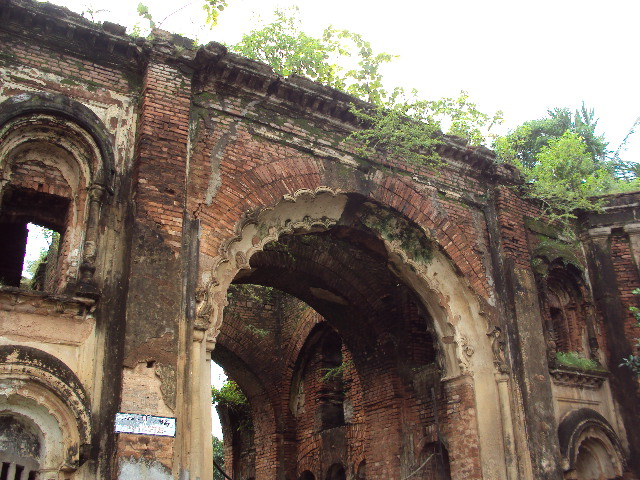
- The Traitor's Gate or Namak Haram Deorhi is the gate to the residence of Mir Jafar. It refers to both the palace and the gate. At present it is in ruins.
- Interactive map of the Jafragunj Deohri area
- Alternative names: Jafarganj Deohri and Jafarganj Palace

General information
- Status: In ruins.
- Location: Lalbagh area, Murshidabad, India
- Coordinates: 24.2025°N 88.2639°E

Namak Haram Deorhi (Bengali: নিমোক হারাম দেওরহি, lit. 'Traitor's Gate'), originally known as Jafragunj Deohri, was the palace of Mir Jafar. It is located in Murshidabad, just opposite to the Jafarganj Cemetery in the Lalbagh area, in the Indian state of West Bengal. Namak Haram Deorhi refers to both the place of Mir Jafar and the main gate which leads to the palace. This building was used as the residence of Mir Jafar, before he ascended the musnad of Bengal or when he was the Commander-in-Chief of the subha.

== Etymology ==
Namak Haram is a Hindi phrase which means "one who is treacherous" or "one who cannot be trusted" while Deorhi is a word in Hindi which means "gate". So the total sums up to "the gate to him who cannot be trusted". It has been named so because Mir Jafar and Mir Miran asked Muhammad-Ali-Beg to kill Nawab Siraj ud-Daulah just for the reason so that Mir Jafar could become the next Nawab of Bengal. Furthermore, his betrayal of his master during the Battle of Plassey eventually led to the total annexation of East India by the East India Company. "Namak Haram Deorhi" is also known by its English transliterated name, the "Traitor's Gate".

== Geography ==
Murshidabad
F: facility, H: historical site
Owing to space constraints in the small map, the actual locations in a larger map may vary slightly

=== Location ===
Namak Haram Deorhi is located at 24.2025°N 88.2639°E.

The House of Jagat Seth, Jafarganj Cemetery, Nashipur Rajbari, Kathgola Palace and Tomb of Azimunissa Begum are all located nearby. One can reach the temple town of Rani Bhavani at Baranagar, on the other side of the Bhagirathi, by country boat from Ajimganj.

Note: The map alongside presents some of the notable locations in Murshidabad city. Most of the places marked in the map are linked in the larger full screen map. A few, without pages yet, remain unmarked. The map has a scale. It will help viewers to find out the distances.

=== Features ===
The palace was fortified with towers and turrets. It was also provided with a cannon to protect it from attacks. Now nothing of the palace remains except the Deorhi (gate) which led to the palace.

== Significance ==
The last secret conference was held here, before the Battle of Plassey, between William Watts, Mir Jafar and his son Mir Miran. Watts was chief of the Kasimbazar (or Cossimbazar) factory of the East India Company. He lived in Bengal, and he was proficient in Bengali, Hindustani and Persian languages. Miran received Watts in one of the palace's seraglio. A seraglio is a sequestered living quarters used by wives and concubines of a Muslim. Watts placed the Quran on Mir Jafar's head and Jafar's hand on the head of Miran. Then Mir Jafar swore with great solemnity that he would faithfully perform whatever he was told to do (i.e. to betray Nawab Siraj ud-Daulah in the Battle of Plassey, which was to be held the next day, so that the British could win the battle and he would be dethroned from the throne of the Nawab of Bengal).

According to Seir Mutaqherin, Nawab Siraj ud-Daulah was murdered by Muhammad-Ali-Beg on the orders of Mir Miran in the campus of this Deorhi, beside the public road under a Neem tree on 2 July 1757 after he fled to save his life, after he was defeated in the Battle of Plassey.

But, according to historian Robert Orme, he was seen to be murdered inside the Mansurganj Palace, on the west banks of the Bhagirathi River, opposite to this Deorhi. There in the Mansurganj Palace Mir Miran used to reside.

After the murder Siraj's mangled body was taken over the river and kept at Jafarganj for the night. The next morning, his body was placed on an elephant and paraded through the streets of Murshidabad and also past Siraj ud-Daulah's mother, Amina Begum's house. He was then taken across the river to Khushbagh.

== Mir Jafar's Palace picture gallery ==
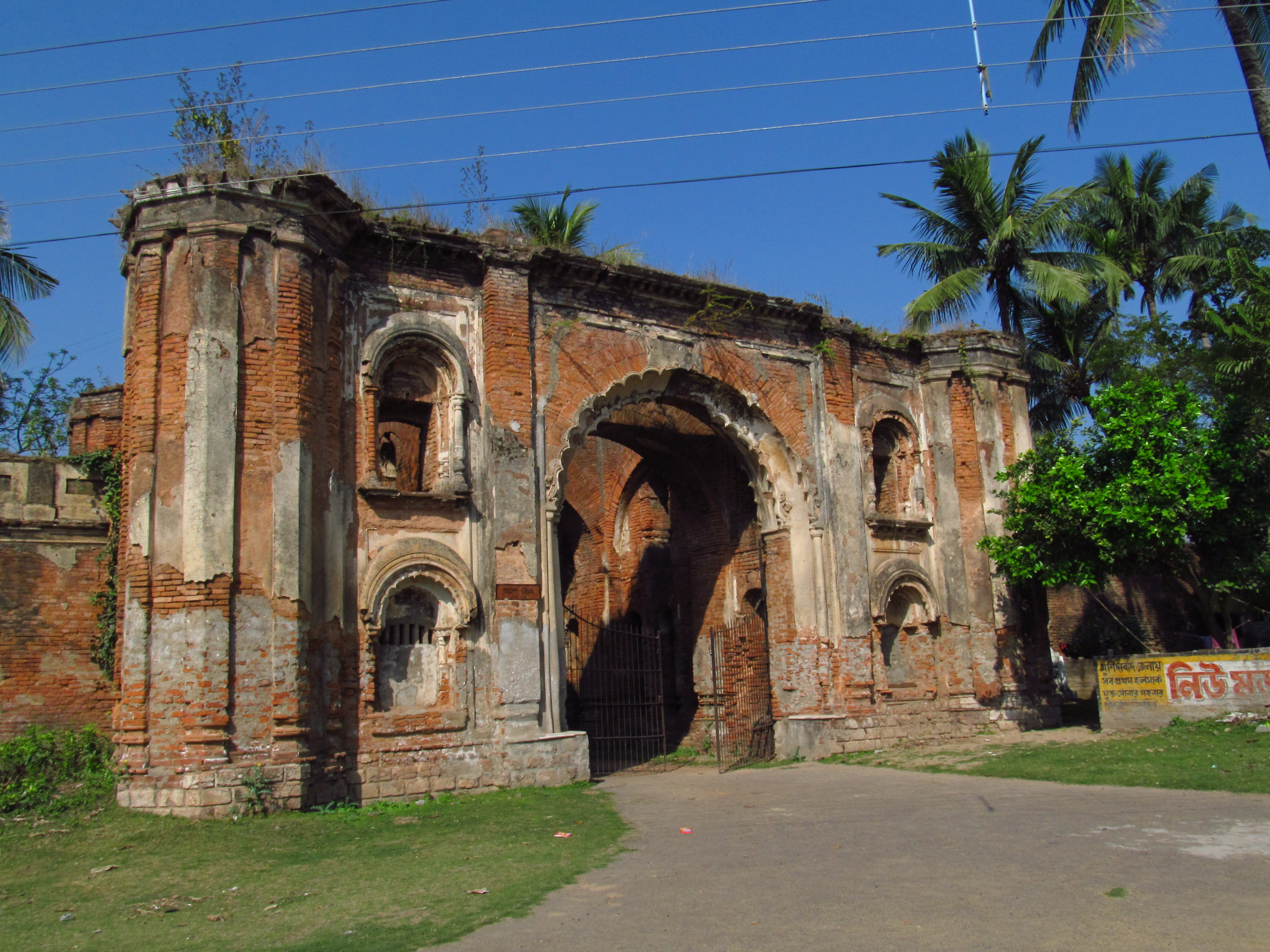
Namak Haram Deorhi

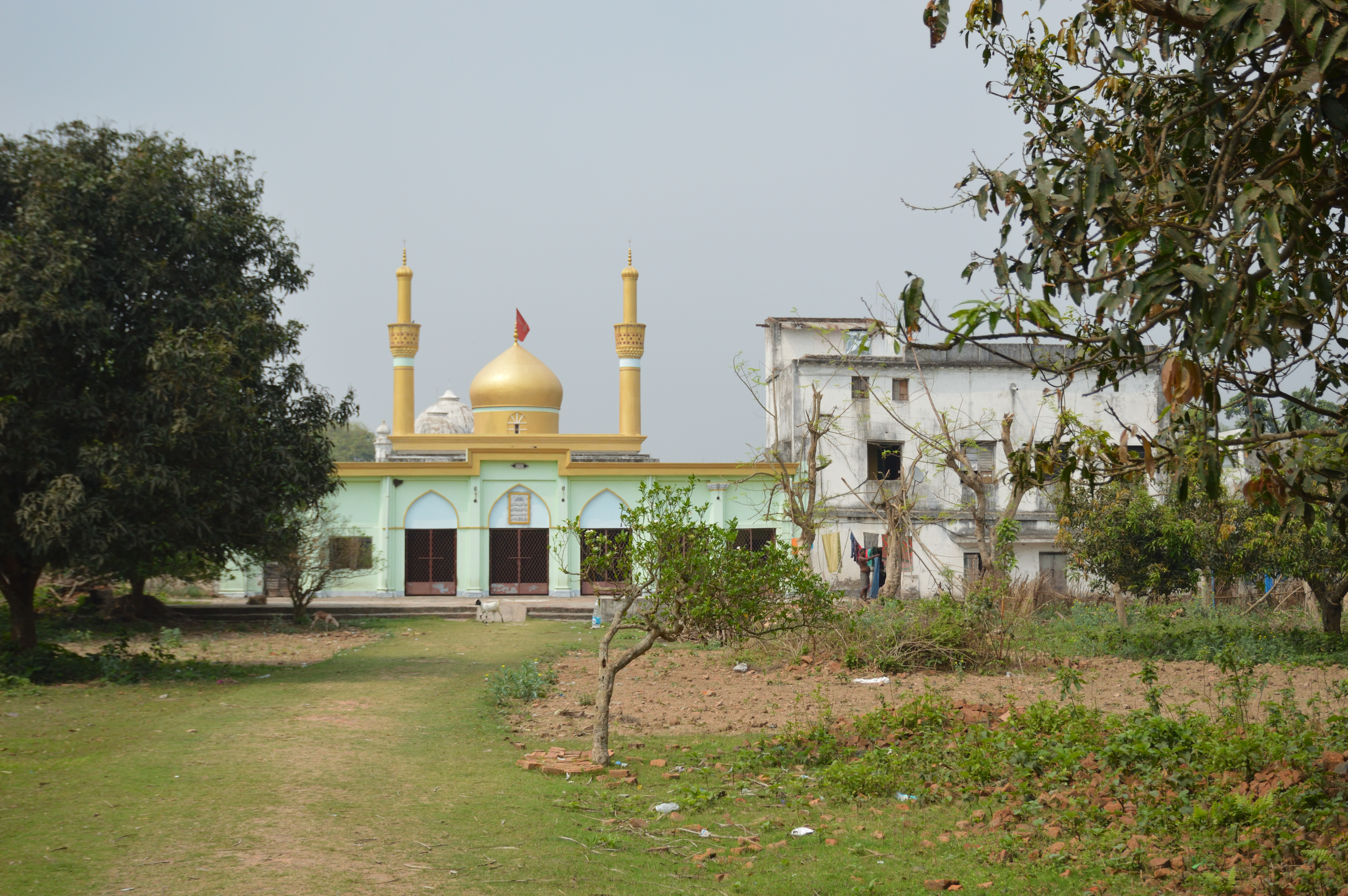
Residence and Imambara

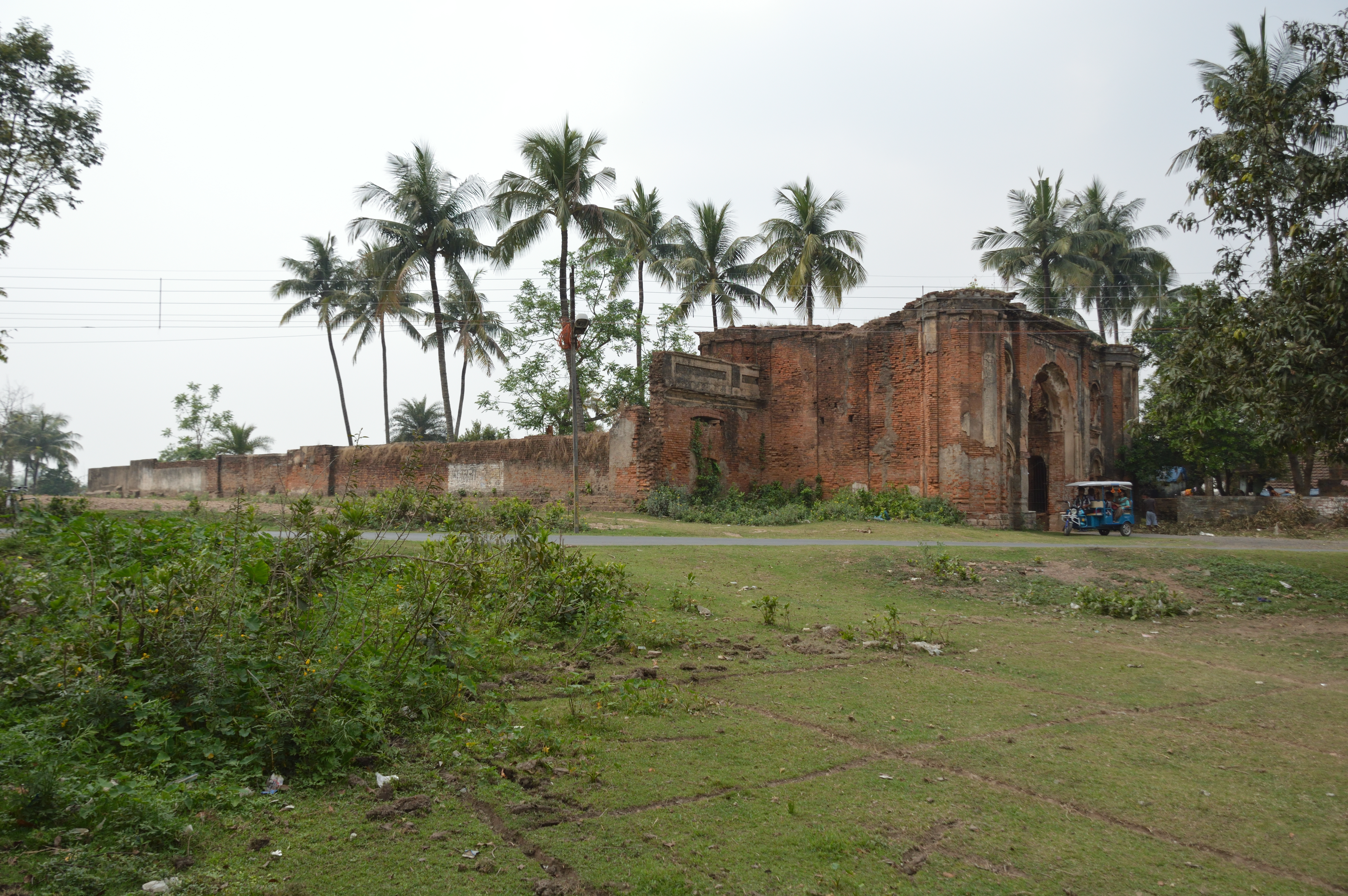
Jafarganj Palace remains with gateway

== See also ==
- Nawabs of Bengal and Murshidabad
