= Tomb of Azimunissa Begum =

- An ASI Listed Monument
- Location within West Bengal Location within India

General information
- Location: Murshidabad district, Azimnagar, India
- Coordinates: 24.1987°N 88.2647°E
- Completed: 1757
- Owner: Archaeological Survey of India

Tomb of Azimunissa Begum is located at Azimnagar (oid Murshidabad), in the Murshidabad district.

According to the List of Monuments of National Importance in West Bengal the Tomb of Azimunissa Begum is an ASI Listed Monument.

== Geography ==
Murshidabad
F: facility, H: historical site
Owing to space constraints in the small map, the actual locations in a larger map may vary slightly

=== Location ===
The Tomb of Begum Azimunnissa is located at 24.1987°N 88.2647°E.

It is about 5–6 km from Hazarduari Palace.

The Namak Haram Deorhi, Jafarganj Cemetery, Nashipur Rajbari, Kathgola Palace and House of Jagat Seth are all located nearby.

Note: The map alongside presents some of the notable locations in Murshidabad city. Most of the places marked in the map are linked in the larger full screen map. A few, without pages yet, remain unmarked. The map has a scale. It will help viewers to find out the distances.

== Azimunissa Begum ==
Azimunissa Begum (also known as Zinatunissa Begum) was daughter of Murshid Quli Khan and wife of the second Nawab of Bengal, Shuja-ud-Din Muhammad Khan. A mosque was built at the place in 1734 by her, but it was partly washed away by a river and only a small part of it remains. The place has well laid out gardens. There is a local myth in circulation that she was a cruel woman and her husband had buried her alive. However, it is hearsay and not confirmed history.

The tomb of Azimunissa Begum is built below the stairs, just like that of her father. It is said that Nawab Murshid Quli Khan had ordered out of humility that his mortal remains be buried below the steps of the Katra Masjid, so as to be trodden on by all who passed up and down.

== Tomb of Azimunissa Begum picture gallery ==
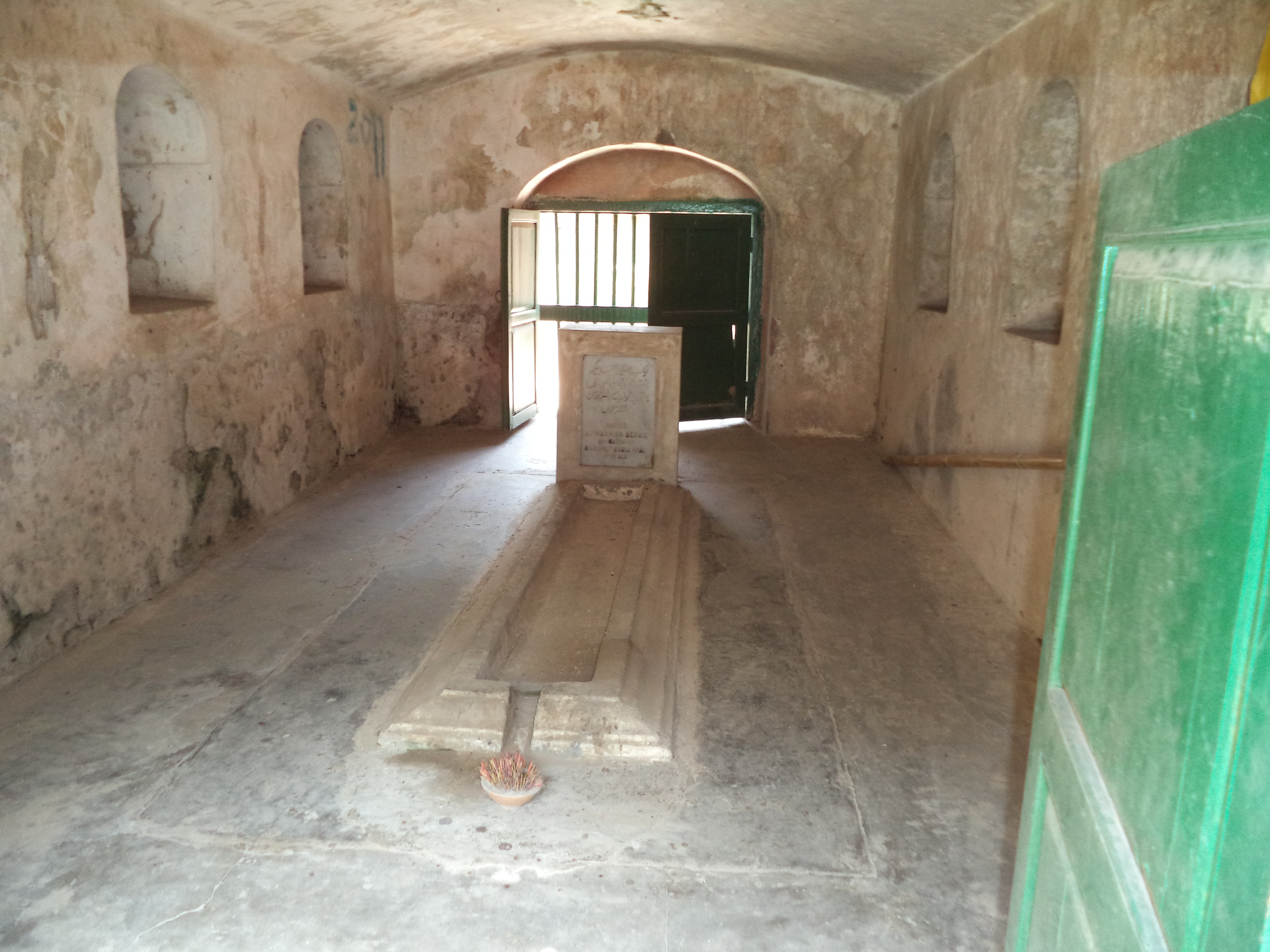
Tomb of Azimunissa Begum

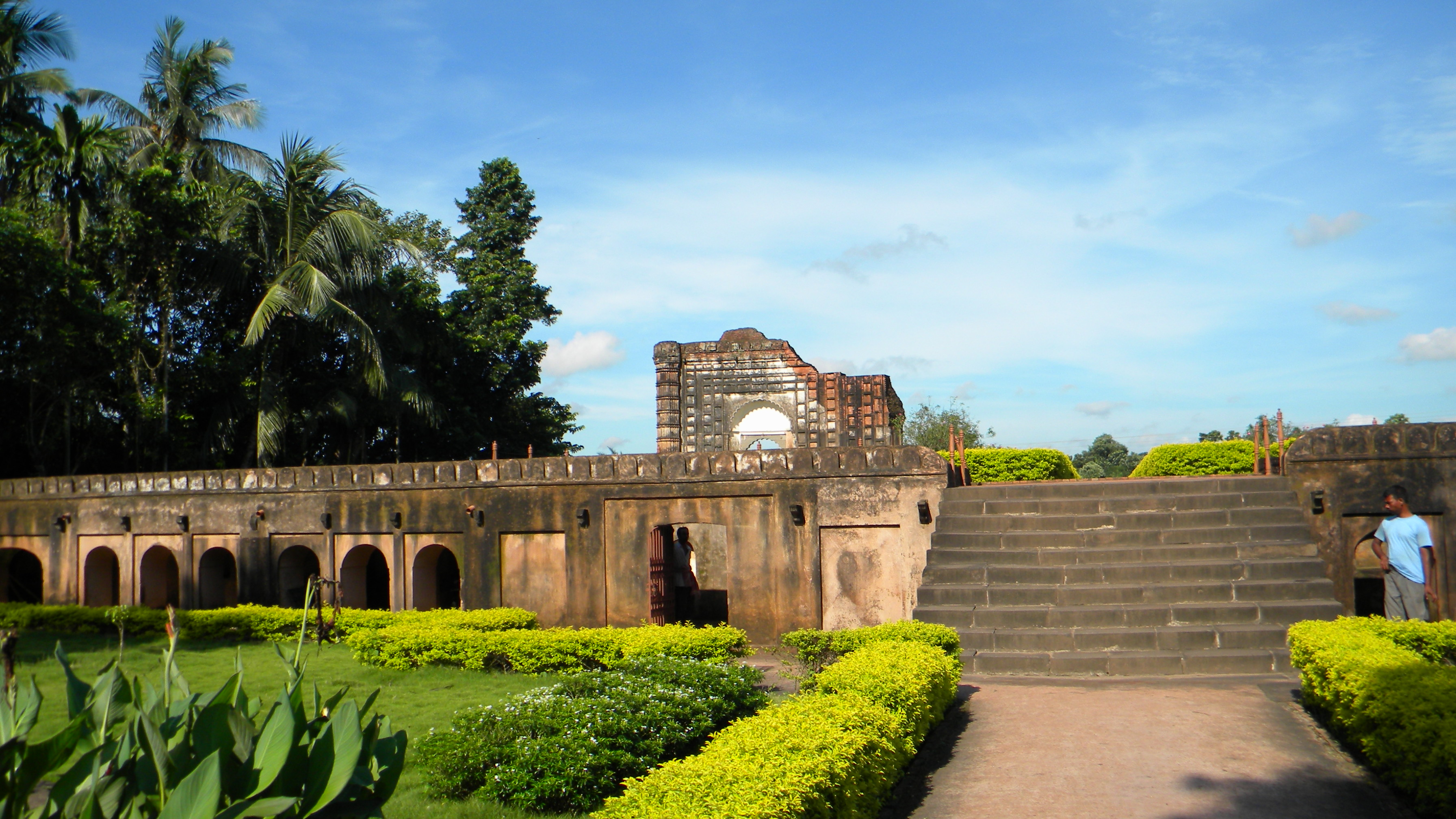
Tomb of Azimunissa Begum

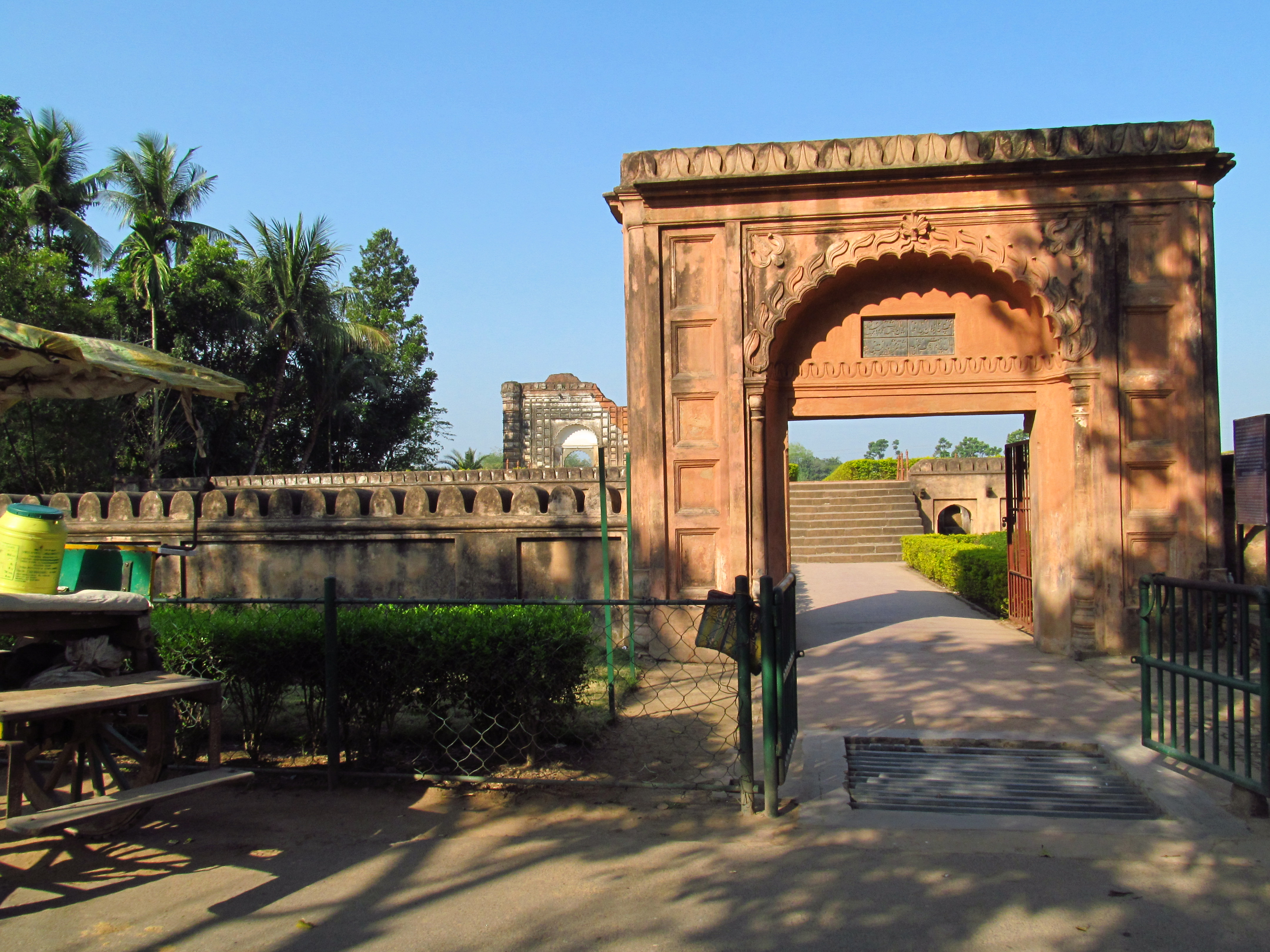
Gateway to the tomb

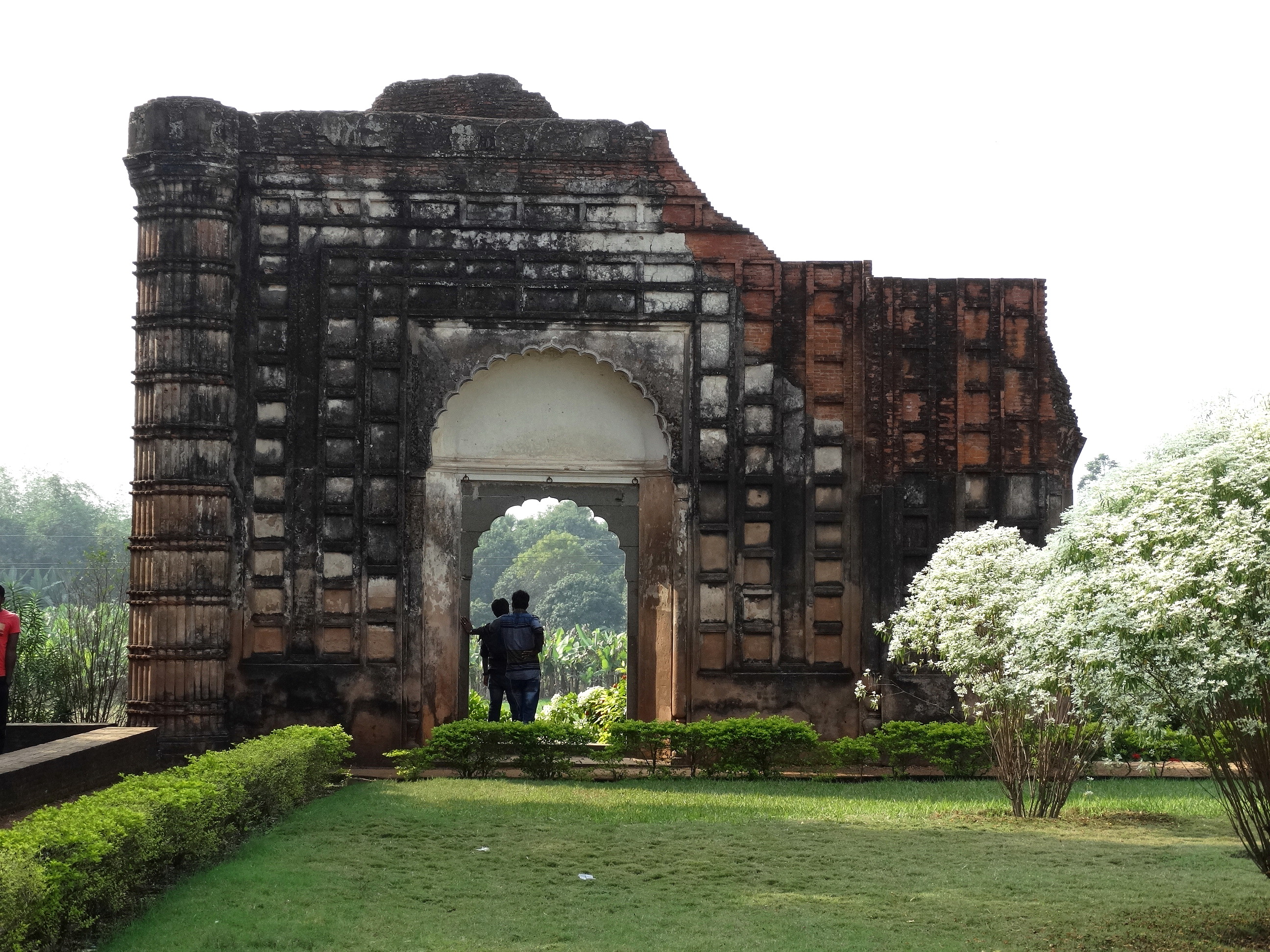
Remains of the mosque

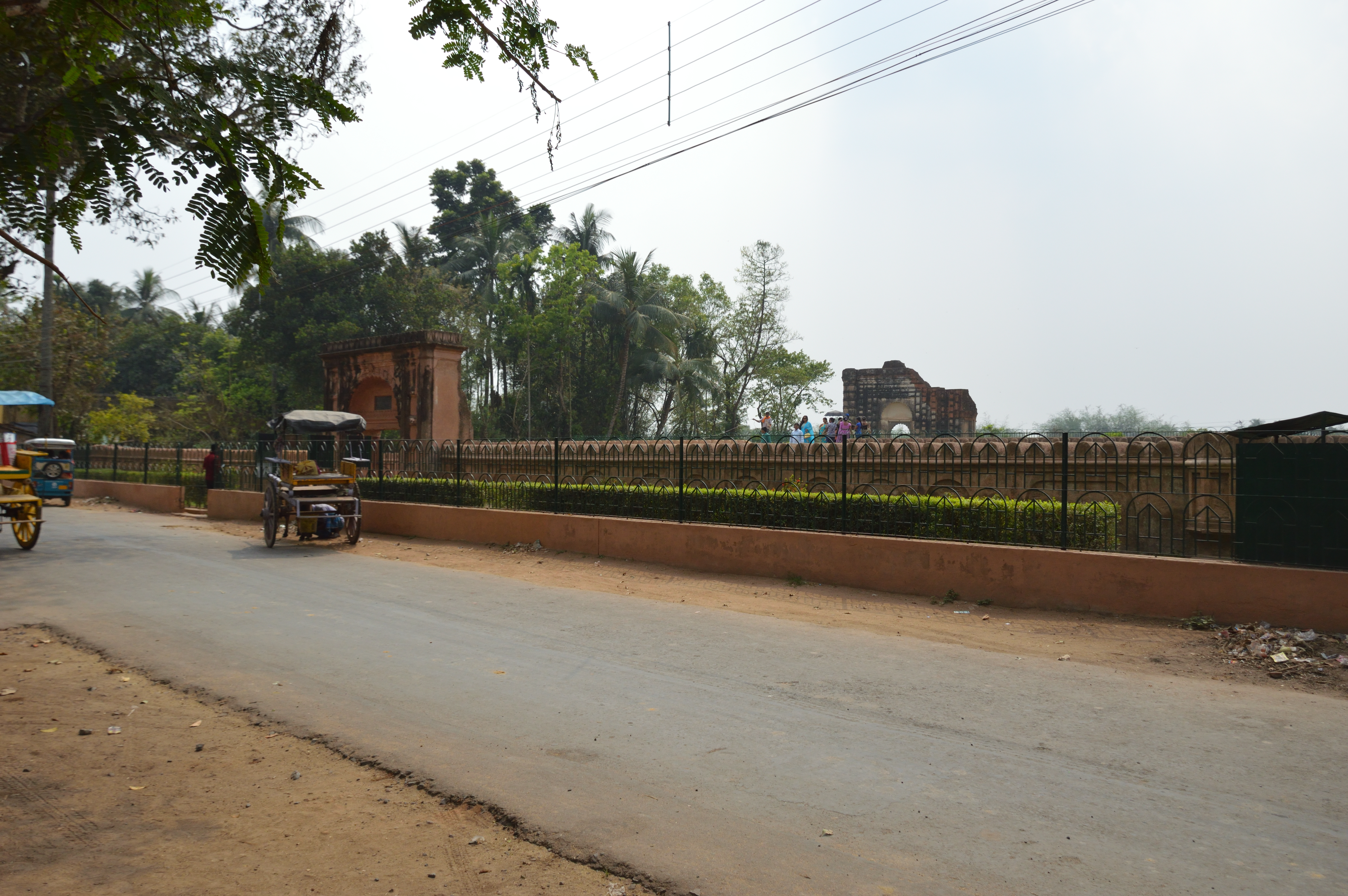
Remains of the mosque

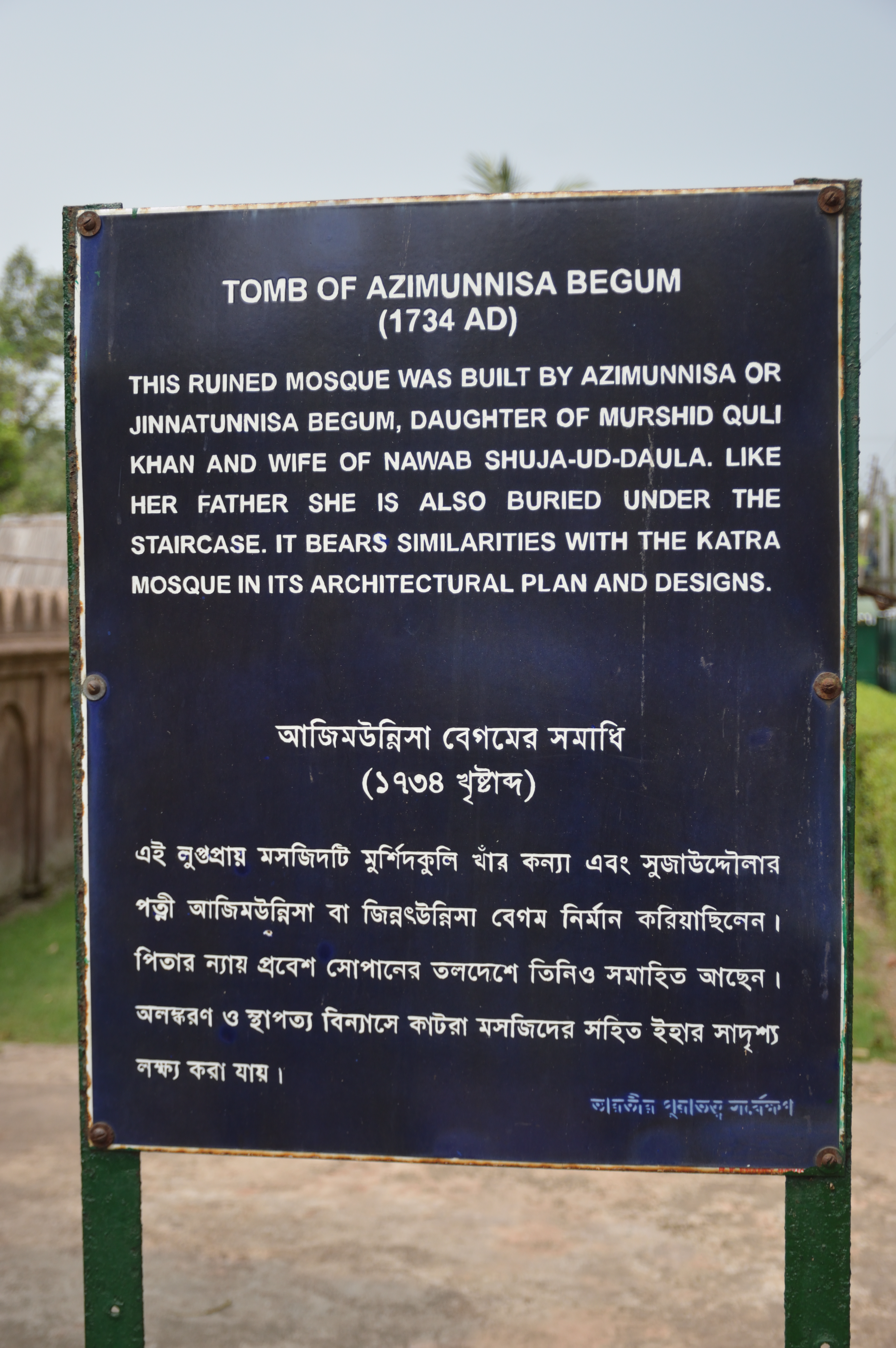
ASI Board

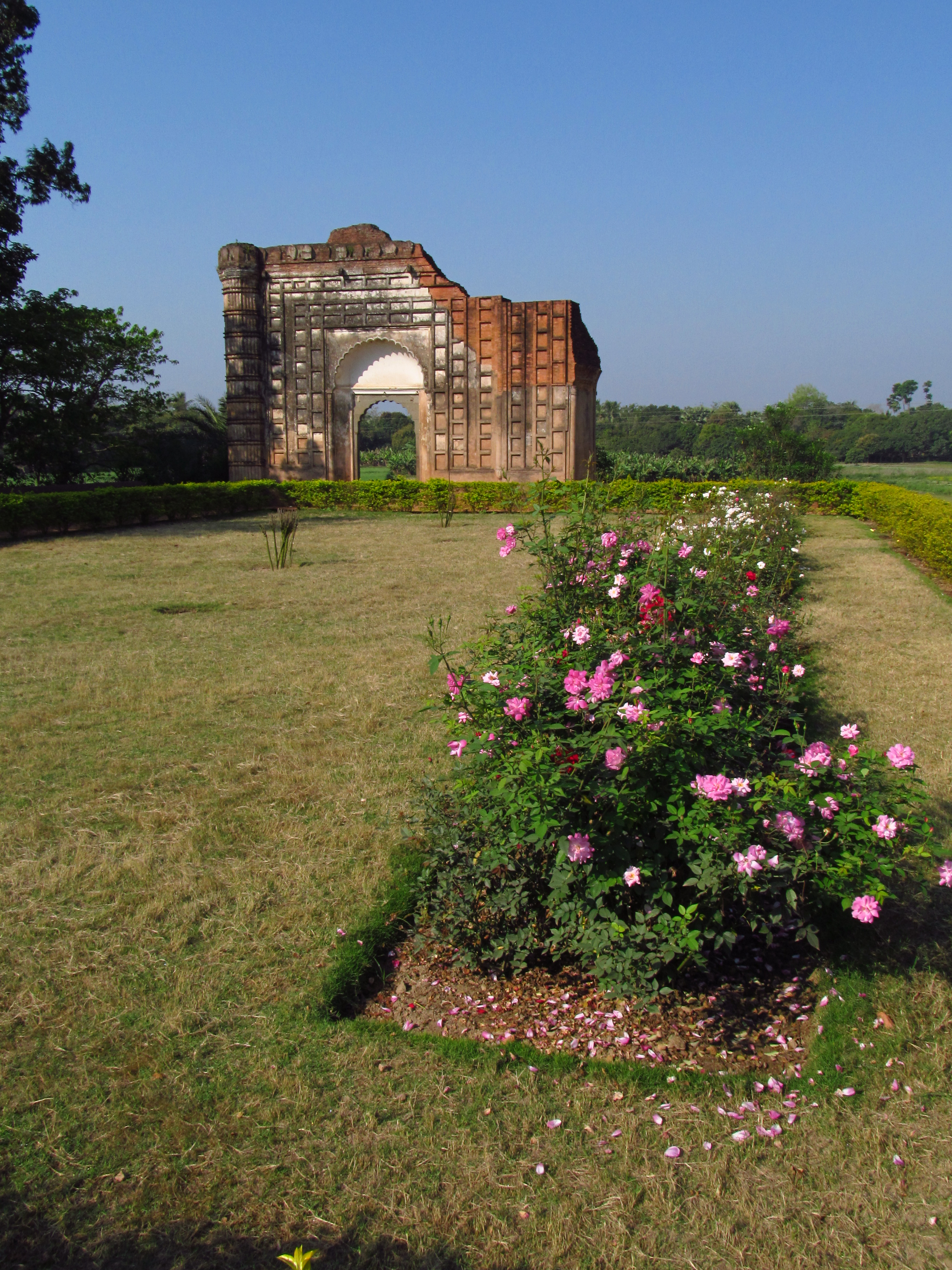
Garden view

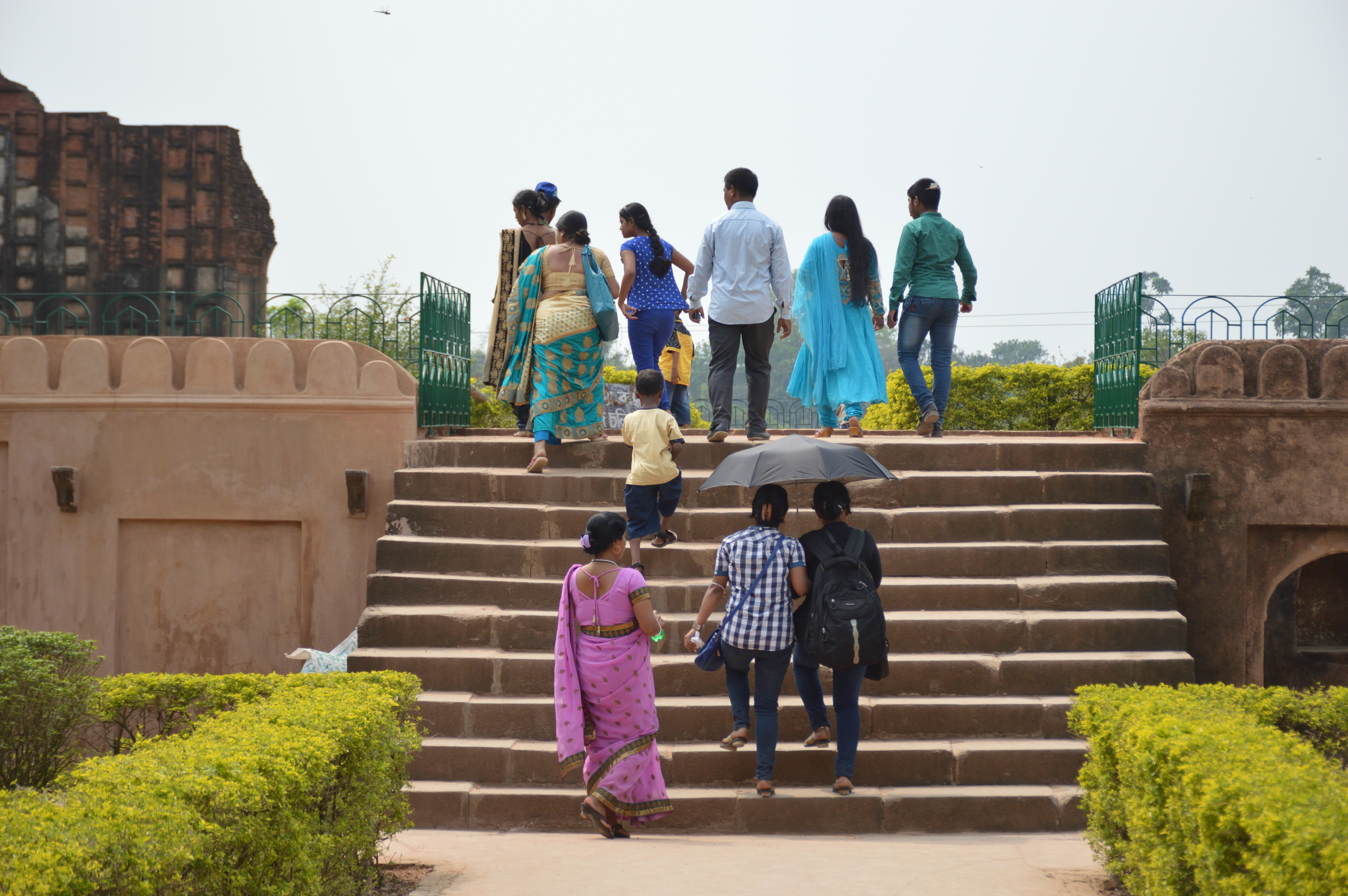
Visitors

== See also ==
- Nawabs of Bengal and Murshidabad
