= Koregram, Murshidabad =

Village in Murshidabad, West Bengal, India

Koregram কোরগ্রাম
- Village
- Location in West Bengal, India Koregram (India)
- Coordinates: 23.819020°N 88.134377°E
- Country: India
- State: West Bengal
- District: Murshidabad
- Subdivision: Kandi
- Block: Bharatpur II

Government
  - Type: Gram Panchayat
  - Body: Tenya Baidyapur Gram Panchayat
  - MP: Yusuf Pathan
  - MLA: Mustafijur Rahaman (Suman)

Area
  - Total: 1.2657 km^{2} (0.4887 sq mi)

Population (2011)
  - Total: 1,170
  - Density: 924/km^{2} (2,390/sq mi)

Languages
  - Official: Bengali, English
- Time zone: UTC+5:30 (IST)
- PIN: 742404 (koregram)
- ISO 3166 code: IN-WB
- Lok Sabha constituency: Baharampur
- Vidhan Sabha constituency: Bharatpur
- Website: murshidabad.gov.in

Koregram (also spelled Korgram; Bengali: কোরগ্রাম) is a village in the Bharatpur II community development block of the Kandi subdivision in Murshidabad district in the Indian state of West Bengal, India. It is administered by the Tenya Baidyapur Gram Panchayat. According to the 2011 Census of India, Koregram has a population of 1,170 and the village code is 315736 .

== Geography ==
Location of Koregram and nearby towns in Murshidabad district, West Bengal

=== Location & Area Overview ===
Koregram is located at 23.819020°N 88.134377°E in the Kandi subdivision of Murshidabad district in West Bengal, India. The village is situated in a predominantly rural area and is connected by local roads. The nearest major town is Katwa located about 10 km away, which serves as a commercial and transport centre for the surrounding region.

== Administration ==
The village is administered by the Tenya Baidyapur Gram Panchayat under the Bharatpur II community development block. The Block Development Office (BDO) of Bharatpur II is located at Salar. Koregram falls within the Kandi subdivision of Murshidabad district, where the Sub-divisional Office (SDO) is located.

== Demographics ==
According to the 2011 Census of India, Koregram has a population of 1,170, comprising 616 males and 554 females. The literacy rate was approximately 80.9%.

== Economy ==
The economy of Koregram is predominantly agrarian, with a majority of the population engaged in agriculture and allied activities. The principal crops cultivated in the area include paddy, wheat and jute, reflecting the broader cropping pattern of Murshidabad district.

In addition to farming, residents are involved in small-scale activities such as animal husbandry, local trade and daily wage labour. The village benefits from its proximity to nearby towns such as Salar, Kandi and Katwa, which serve as local commercial centres for the marketing of agricultural produce and access to basic services.

== Education ==
Primary education facilities are available in the village, including Koregram Primary School and Koregram Hazrapara SSK. Secondary and higher secondary education facilities are available in nearby areas, including Tenya S.S. Das Vidyamandir and Baidyapur High School (H.S.).

== Transport ==
Koregram is connected by local roads to nearby towns such as Katwa and Salar. The nearest railway station is Tenya railway station (TYAE), which serves the surrounding rural area. Additional rail connectivity is available at Salar railway station (SALE) , which connects the area to the broader rail network.

== Postal services ==
Koregram BO Post Office is serving the area. The village falls under Tenya Sub Post Office (S.O), which is located in Murshidabad district and has PIN code 742404.

== See also ==
- Murshidabad district
- Kandi subdivision
- Salar, Murshidabad
- Bharatpur, Murshidabad
- Berhampore
- Katwa
