= Khandakar Fazle Rabbi =

Writer, clerk, Muslim nationalist

Khan Bahadur Khandakar Fazle Rabbi
- খোন্দকার ফজলে রব্বী
- Born: 1848; Salar, Murshidabad, Bengal Presidency, British India
- Died: 1917 (aged 68–69); British India
- Occupation: Dewan of Nawab of Murshidabad
- Children: Khandakar Ali Afzal
- Parent: Khandakar Obaidul Akbar
- Relatives: Rehman Sobhan (grandnephew); Farooq Sobhan (grandnephew)
- Family: Khandakars of Salar

Khandakar Fazle Rabbi (1848 – 1917) was a writer and clerk. He served as the Dewan for the Nawab of Murshidabad.

== Background ==
Khandakar Fazle Rabbi was born in 1848 in Salar, Murshidabad in the then Bengal Presidency into one of the aristocratic Bengali Muslim families of Murshidabad during the reign of the Nawabs of Murshidabad. The Khandakars of Murshidabad had claimed descent from the first Muslim Caliph, Abu Bakr; they claim that one of Abu Bakr's eighth generation descendants had migrated from Arabian Peninsula to Iran, however this claim is historically untenable given the claimed number of generations between Rabbi and Abu Bakr and the by-far over average fathering age between them, suggesting a fabrication. Khawaja Rustam, a descendant of this migrant from Arabia to Iran, had migrated from Khorasan, Iran to the Indian subcontinent, his son Khawaja Ziauddin Zahid settling in Allahabad. They had later moved to Bengal, where Sheikh Sirajuddin, son of Khawaja Ziauddin Zahid was appointed as Qazi-ul-Quzzat by Sultan Ghiyasuddin. Rabbi's father, Khandakar Ubaidul Akbar, served Mir Munshi (Chief Minister) in the government of the Nawab of Murshidabad.

== Education and work ==
Rabbi, like many of his family members though Bengali-speaking, was proficient in the Persian and Urdu languages, the languages of the official Mughal style court. He had also gone beyond the traditions of aristocratic families in Bengal of only being educated in Persian and Urdu, but had also pursued education in English language, he was the first one in his lineage to have attained a BA degree in English. Khandakar Fazle Rabbi had also encouraged his son Khandakar Ali Afzal and nephews to seek English education, as this was the way into government service in the British Raj.

In 1869, Khandakar Fazle Rabbi, aged 21 travelled to England to manage the affairs of the last Nawab Nazim of Murshidabad. He was permitted to return in 1874 by the Nawab of Murshidabad, and was put in charge of the finances of the Nawab, and was appointed as Dewan of the Nawab of Murshidabad in 1881. Due to his services, he was awarded the title of ‘Khan Bahadur’ by Queen Victoria in 1897.

Rabbi was an executive committee member of the Muslim Literary Society of Kolkata in 1900, and a member of the imperial league organised by the Zamindar of Burdwan in 1909.

== Written works ==
Rabbi had written three books ‘Kitab e Tasdikun Lehad’, ‘Hakikate Musalman e Bangalah’ and ‘Tareekh e Hindustan. ’ The first mentioned book is a history of the Khandakars of Salar, Murshidabad. The second is a book regarding the origins of Bengali society. The third is a history of the Indian subcontinent.

== Personal life ==
Rabbi had one son, Khandakar Ali Afzal (1902-1969), he was a barrister and a one-time secretary of the Bengal Legislative Assembly. Afzal was the father of the late-businesswoman, Rokia Afzal Rahman.
