= Bazarsau railway station =

Railway station in West Bengal, India

General information
- Location: Bazarsau, Murshidabad district, West Bengal; India
- Coordinates: 23°31′24″N 88°06′21″E
- Elevation: 21 m (69 ft)
- System: Express train, Passenger train station
- Owner: Indian Railways
- Operator: Eastern Railway zone
- Line: Barharwa–Azimganj–Katwa loop
- Platforms: 4
- Tracks: 4

Construction
- Structure type: At grade

Other information
- Status: Active
- Station code: BZLE
- Zone(s): Eastern Railway
- Division(s): Howrah

History
- Former names: East Indian Railway Company

Services
Preceding station	Indian Railways	Following station
Kazipara Halt towards ?	Eastern Railway zone Azimganj–Katwa line	Miangram towards ?
Location

Bazarsau railway station is a railway station on the Howrah–Azimganj line of Howrah railway division of Eastern Railway zone. It is situated at Bazarsau village in Murshidabad district in the Indian state of West Bengal.

== History ==
In 1913, the Hooghly–Katwa Railway constructed a 5 ft 6 in (1,676 mm) broad gauge line from Bandel to Katwa, and the Barharwa–Azimganj–Katwa Railway constructed the 5 ft 6 in (1,676 mm) broad gauge Barharwa–Azimganj–Katwa loop. With the construction of the Farakka Barrage and opening of the railway bridge in 1971, the railway communication picture of this line were completely changed. A total of 40 trains, including expresses, passengers and EMU, stop at Bazarsau railway station. Distance between Howrah and Bazarsau railway station is approximately 175 km.
