= Abul Barkat =

Bengali Language Movement protester (1927–1952)

- আবুল বরকত
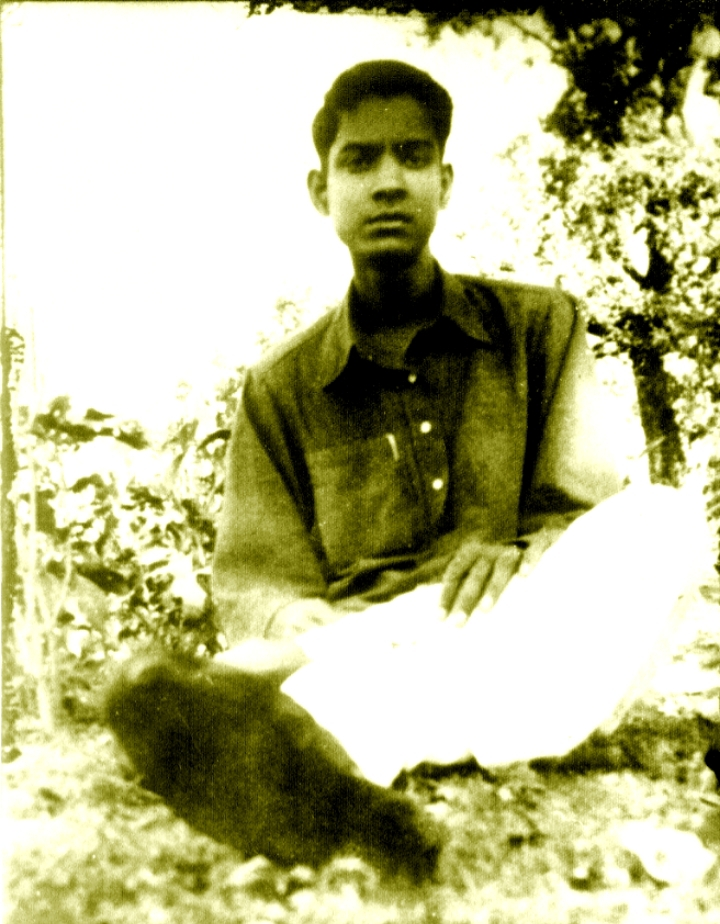
- Born: 16 June 1927; Salar, Bengal Presidency, British India
- Died: 21 February 1952 (aged 24); Dhaka, East Bengal, Pakistan
- Resting place: Azimpur Graveyard, Dhaka
- Occupation: Language rights activist

Abul Barkat (Bengali: আবুল বরকত; 16 June 1927 – 21 February 1952) was a protester killed during the Bengali language movement protests that took place in the erstwhile East Pakistan (currently Bangladesh), in 1952. He is considered a martyr in Bangladesh.

== Early life ==
Abul Barkat was born on 16 June 1927, in Babla village, Salar, at that time Bharatpur Block, Murshidabad, West Bengal, British Raj. He studied in Babla primary school and completed his matriculation from Talibpur High School in 1945 and completed his intermediate from Krishnath College in 1947. He moved to Dhaka in 1948 after the Partition of India. He completed his BA in political science at the University of Dhaka in 1951. He started his MA in political science at Dhaka University.

== Bengali Language Movement ==
On 21 February 1952, students bought out a protest, despite Section 144 (curfew) being imposed, demanding that the Bengali language be given the status of a national language. The police fired at the protestors on the road in front of Dhaka Medical College. Abul Barkat was seriously injured and later died at the Dhaka Medical College around 8:00 pm on February 21, 1952. He was buried in the Azimpur Graveyard. His mother, Hasina Begum, inaugurated the Shaheed Minar in 1963.

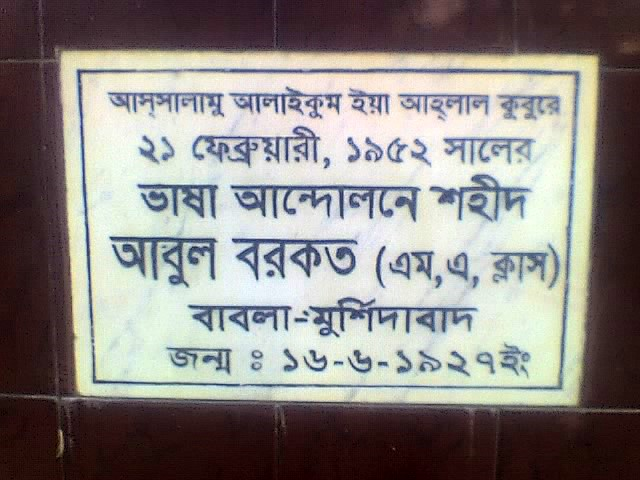
Epitaph on Abul Barkat's grave at Azimpur Graveyard, Dhaka (2007).

== Legacy ==
Abul Barkat was awarded the Ekushey Padak in 2000. A museum has been built for him on the Dhaka University campus. A documentary titled Bayanno'r Michhil was made about his life. Movement Hero Abul Barkat memorial museum and archive was opened in 2012 at Dhaka University; it was financed by the Dhaka District Council.

== Gallery ==
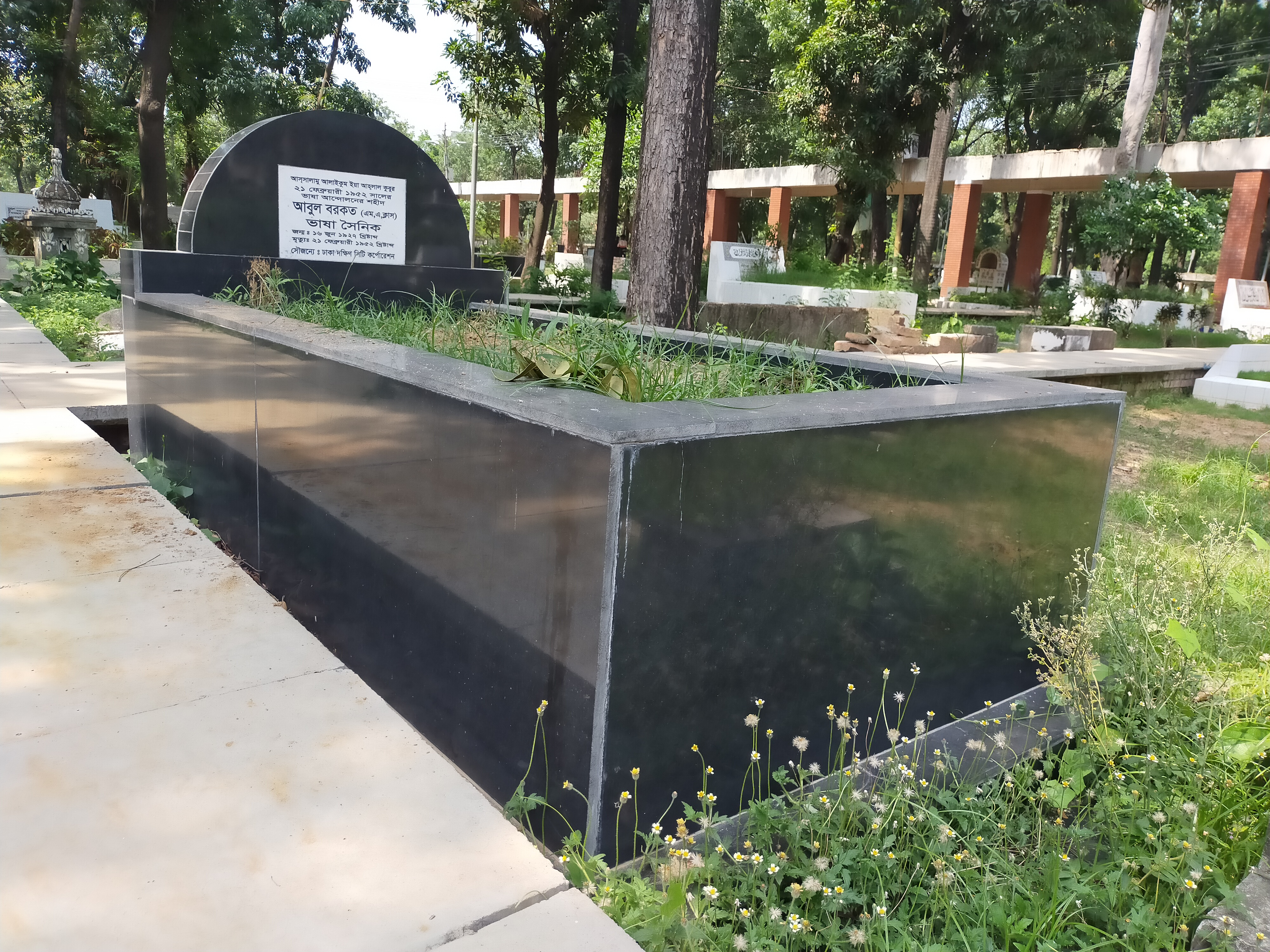
Grave of language martyr Abul Barkat (1927–1952) at Azimpur graveyard, Dhaka (2021)
