= Kathgola =

Coordinates: 24.207093°N 88.26707°E

- Neighbourhood in Murshidabad
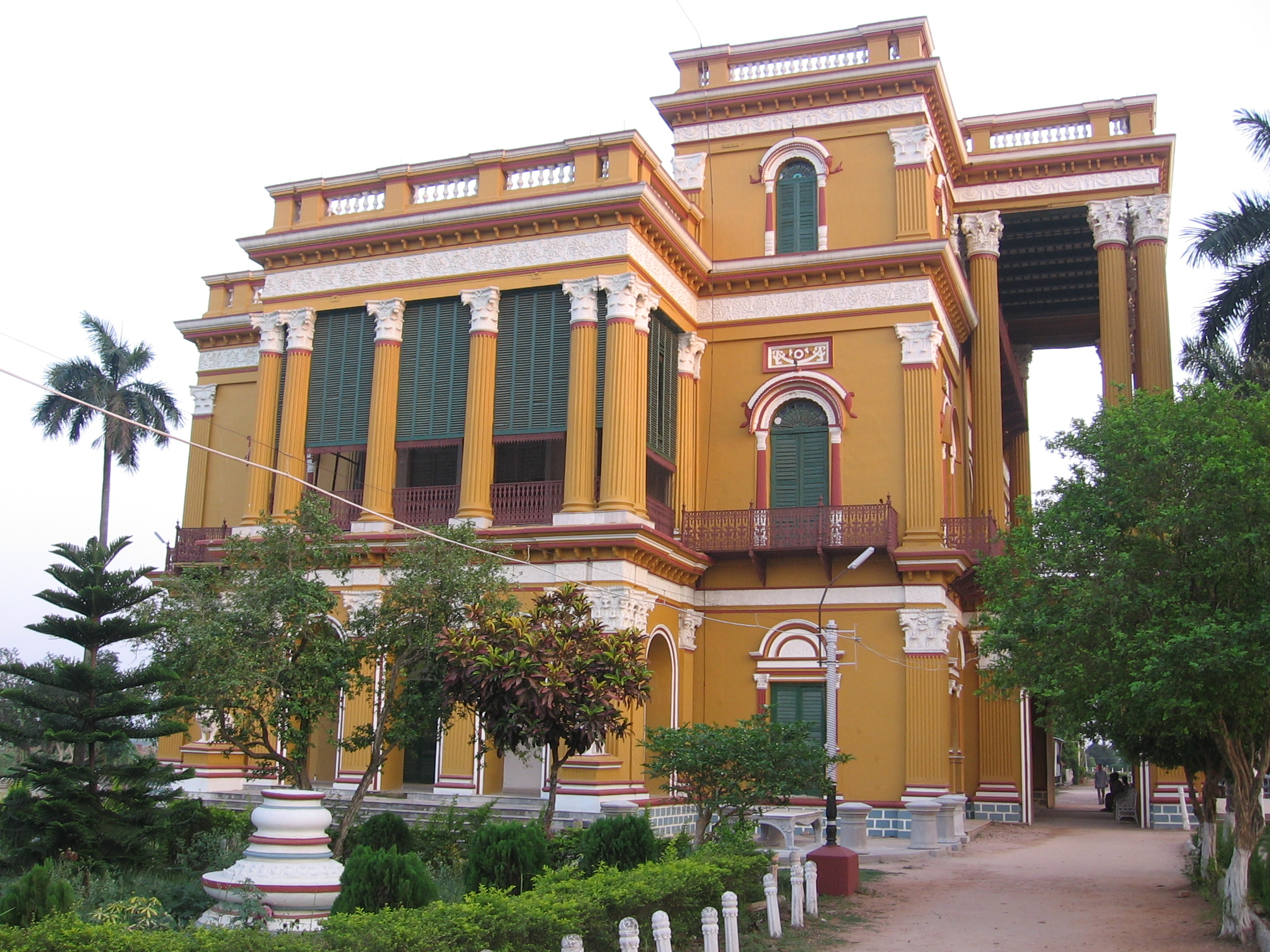
- The Kathgola Palace, also known as Kathgola Raj Bari.
- Interactive map of Kathgola

Kathgola (also known as Katgola) is a neighbourhood in the city of Murshidabad which was at one time the capital of Bengal, Bihar and Orissa during the reign of the Nawabs of Bengal.

== History ==
Kathgola often refers to the Kathgola Palace. Kathgola Gardens, also known as the Kathgola Temple, was built by Lakshmipat Singh Dugar.

== Kathgola Gardens ==
It is said that black roses were cultivated here but now only mango trees can be seen here. The gardens cover 30 acres.

== Adinath Temple ==
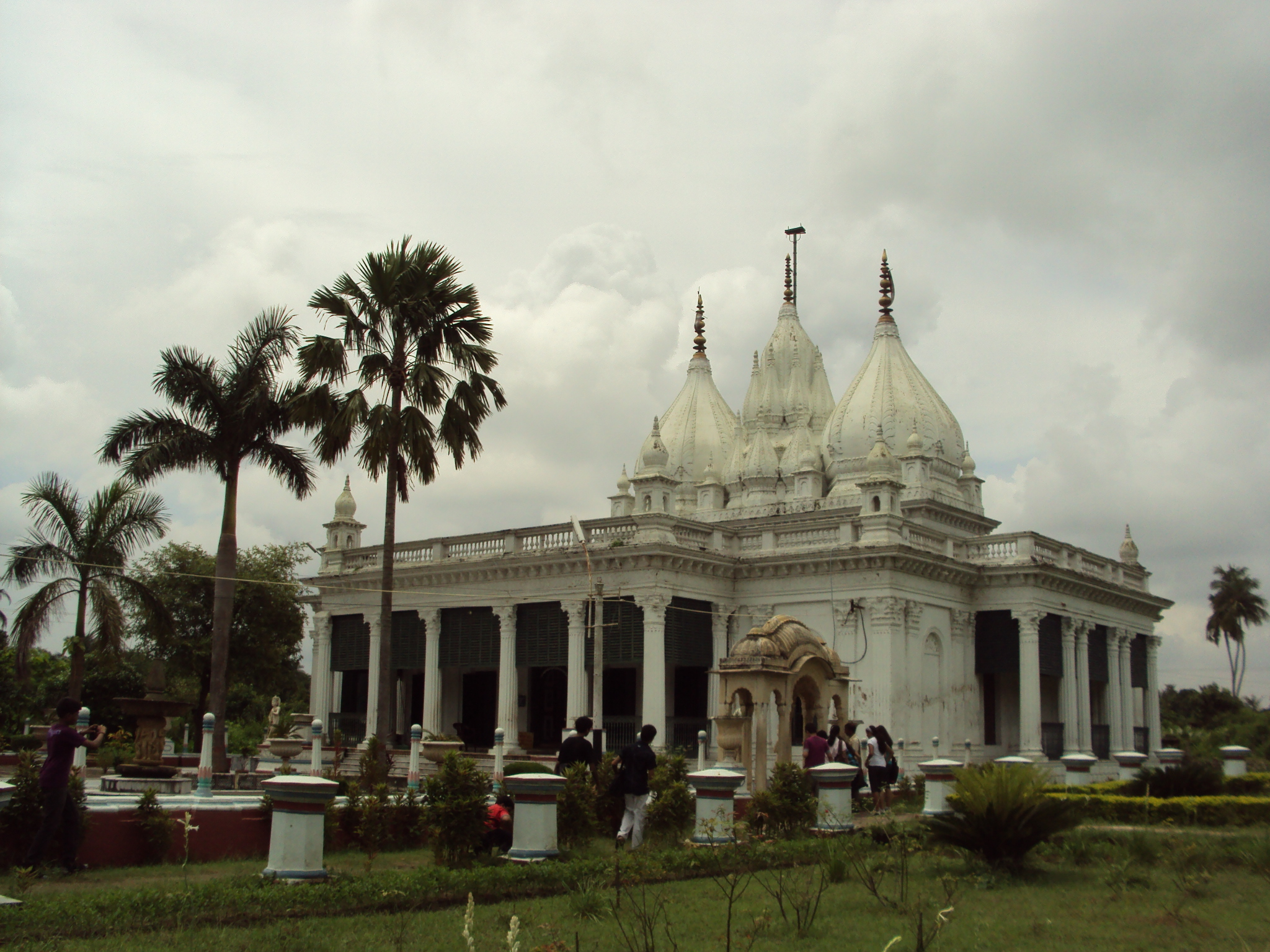
The temple in the Kathgola Gardens.

Adinath Temple also known as Paresh Nath Temple or Kathgola Temple is situated in the Kathgola Gardens. It is a temple dedicated to Bhagawan Adishvar. Moolnayak of this temple is a 90 cm. white colored idol of Bhagawan Adishvar padmasana posture. The idol of Bhagwan Adinatha is very ancient and considered to be around 900 years old. There are 17 other images of Jain Tithankaras and other deities. This temple was built in 1933 by Lakshmipat Singh Dugar due to inspiration from his mother. The architecture of the temple is unique of its kind. A dadabari dedicated to jain saint Jinadutta Suriji Maharaj is present near the Adinath Temple. The dadabari contains a pair of Charans of Guru Jinadutta Suriji Maharaj, and was built at the same time as the main temple.

== Kathgola Palace ==
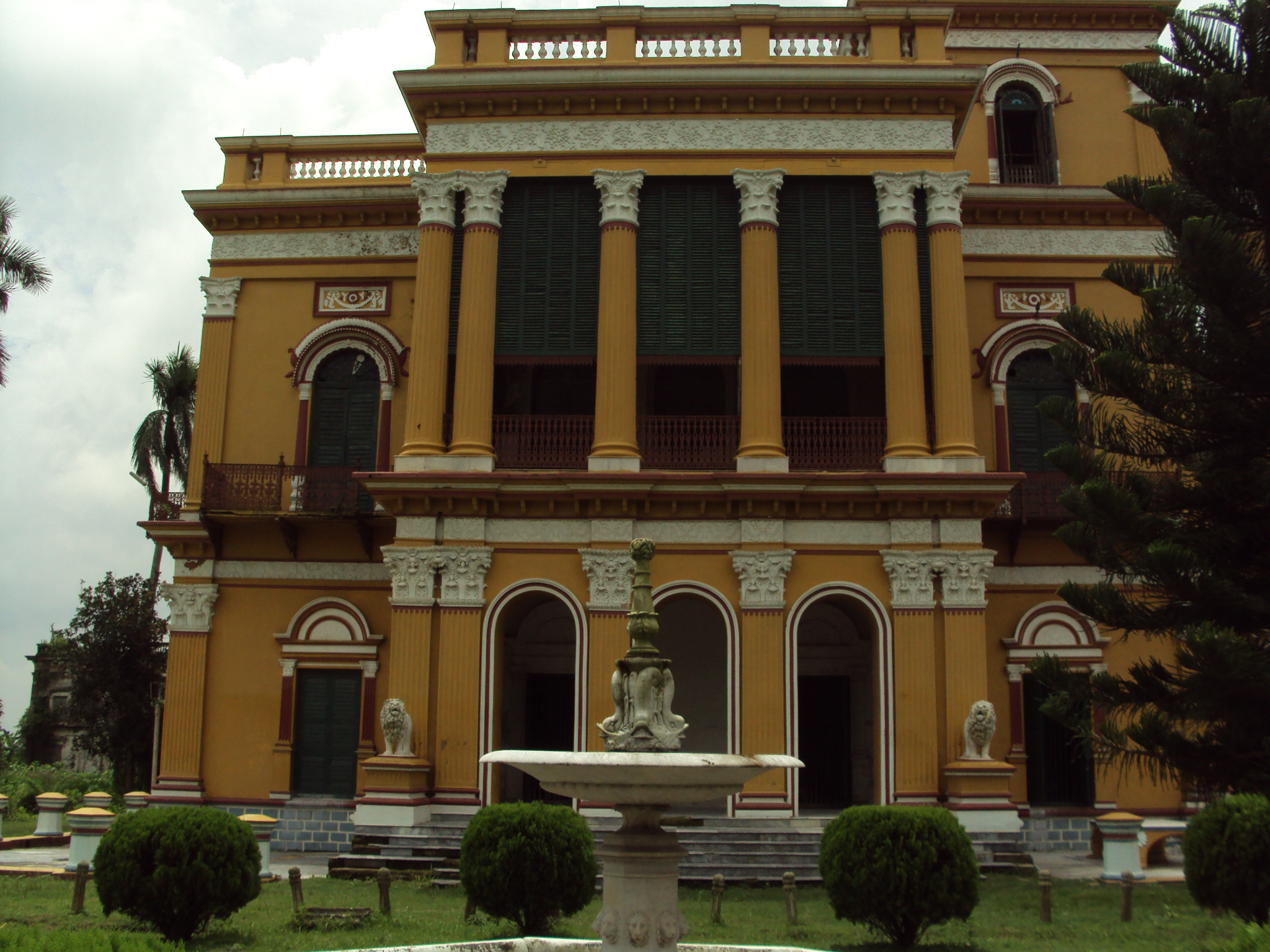
The Kathgola Palace

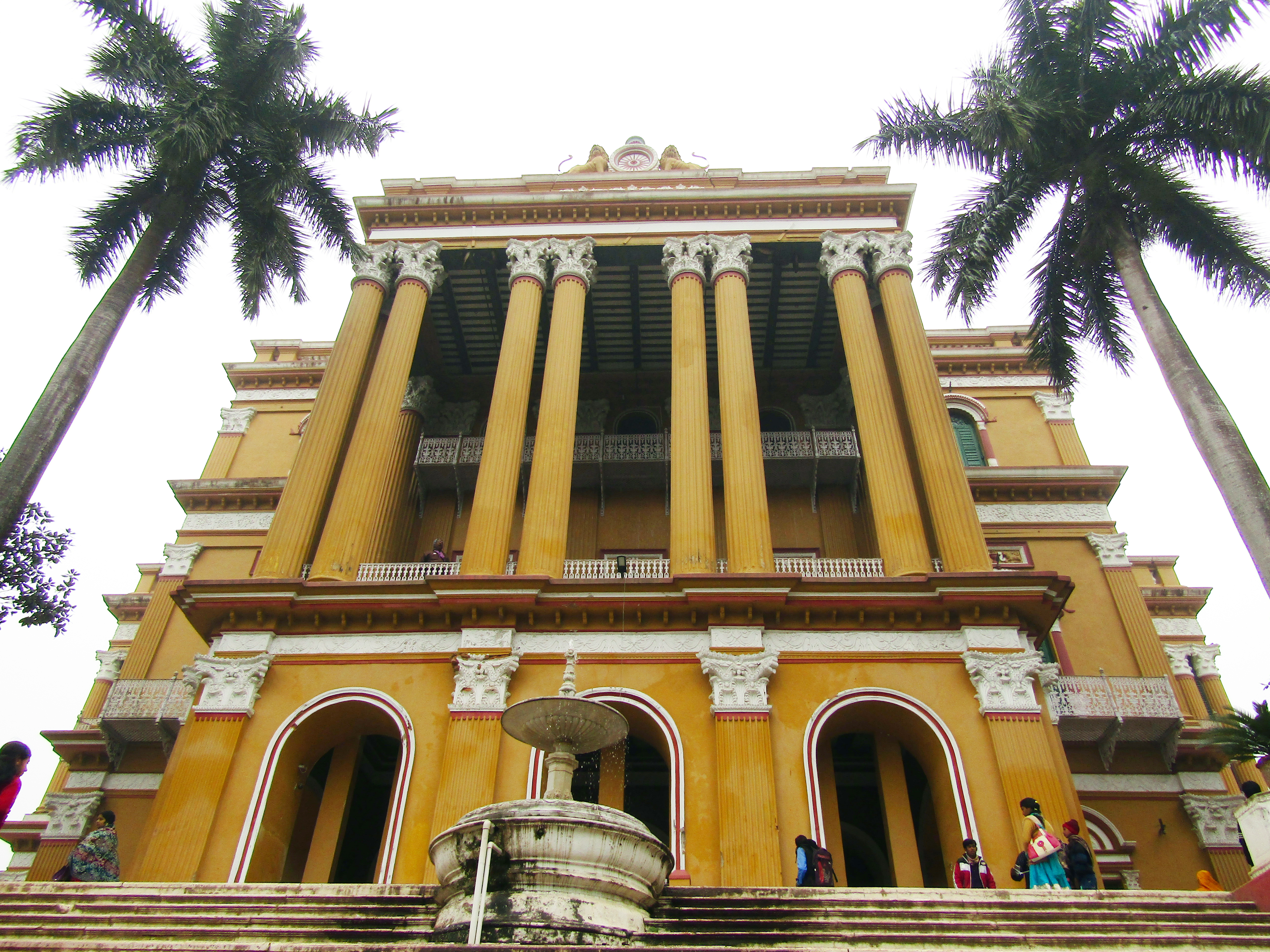
Façade of the palace

Kathgola Palace is a four-storeyed palatial palace in the Kathgola Gardens. It has an ornamented facade with paintings, mirrors and furniture. Beside the palace is a small pond and a baoli.

== Gallery ==
Kathgola Gallery

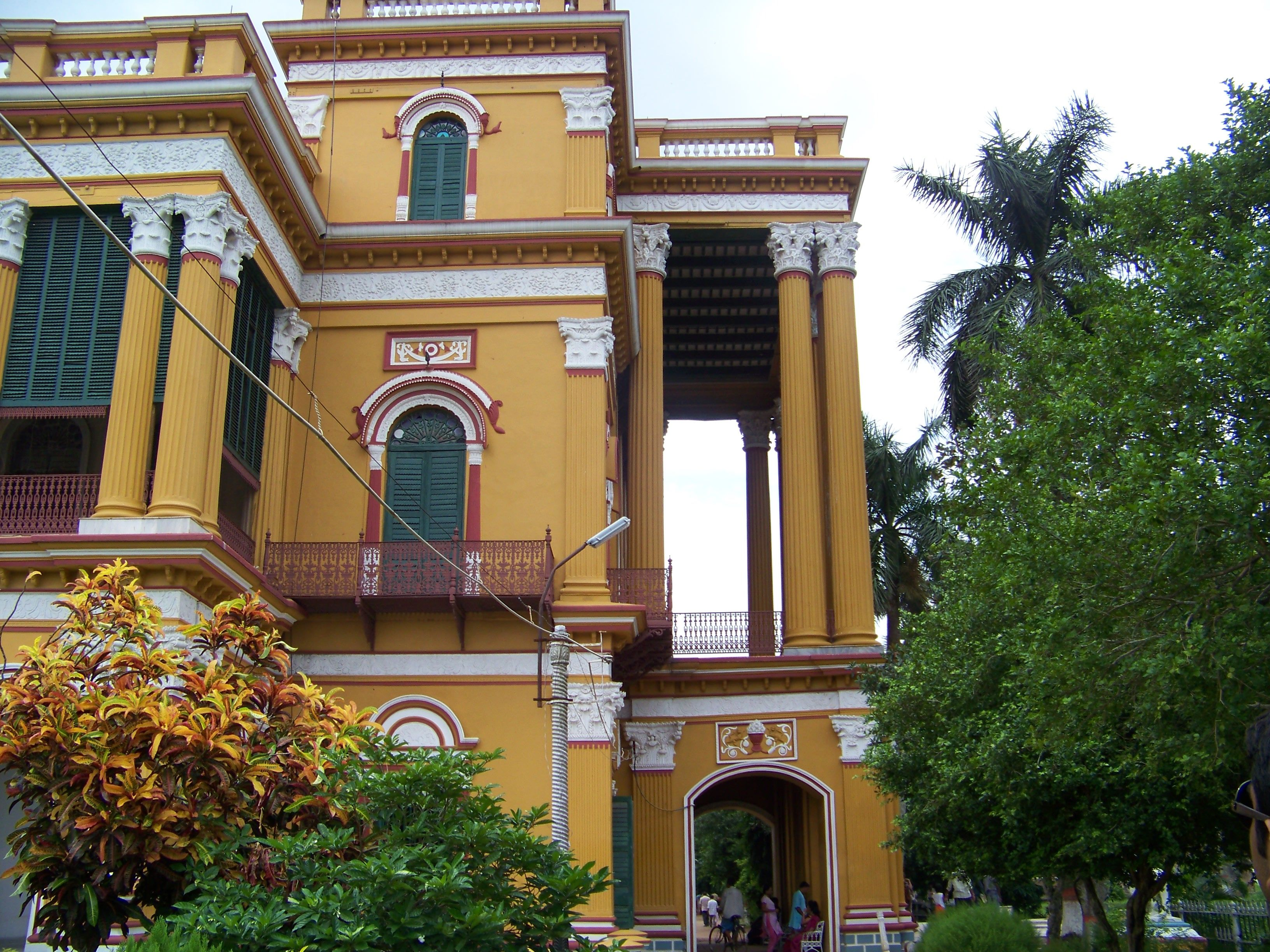
The Katgola Palace

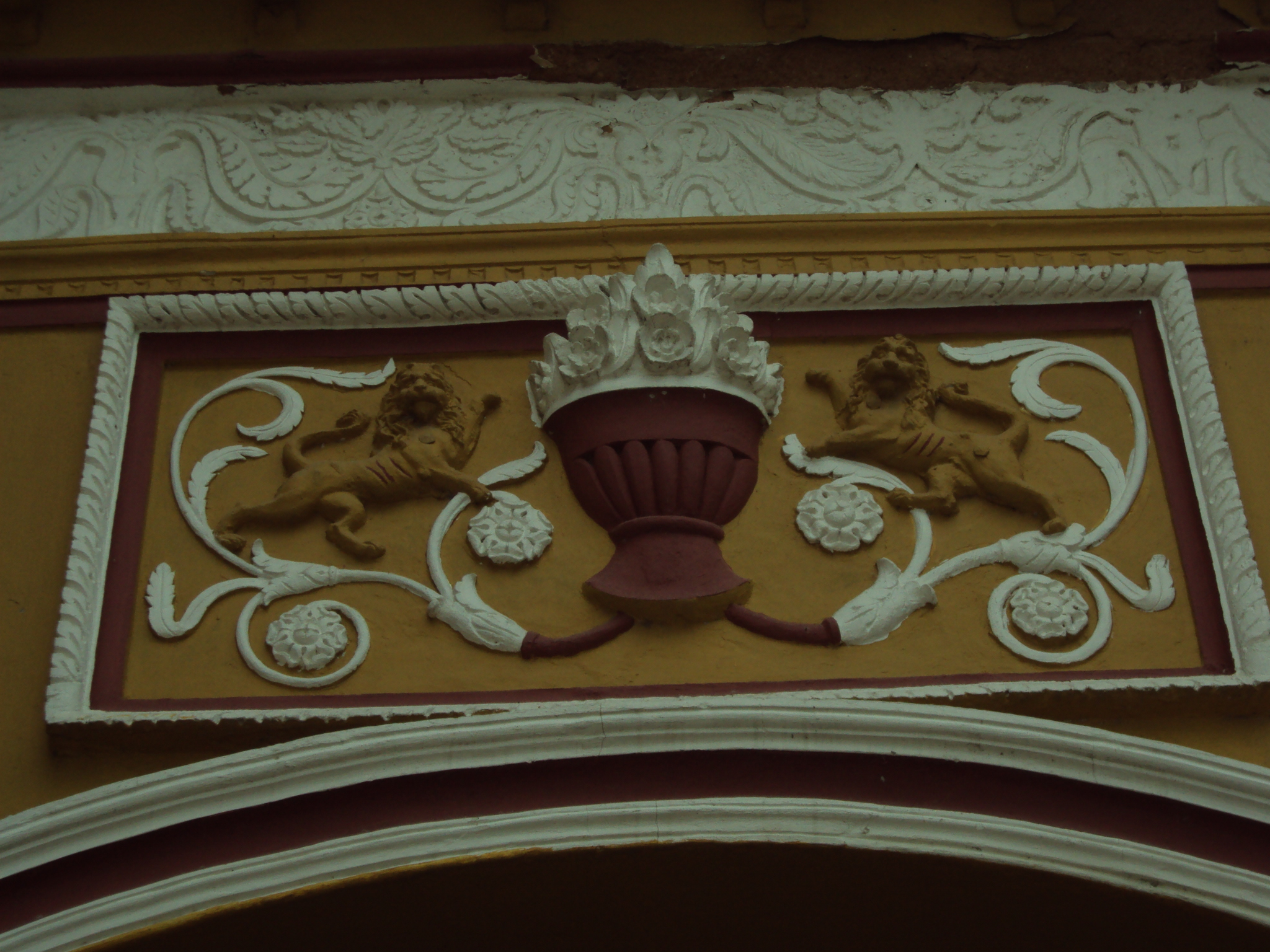
The ornamented wall of the palace.

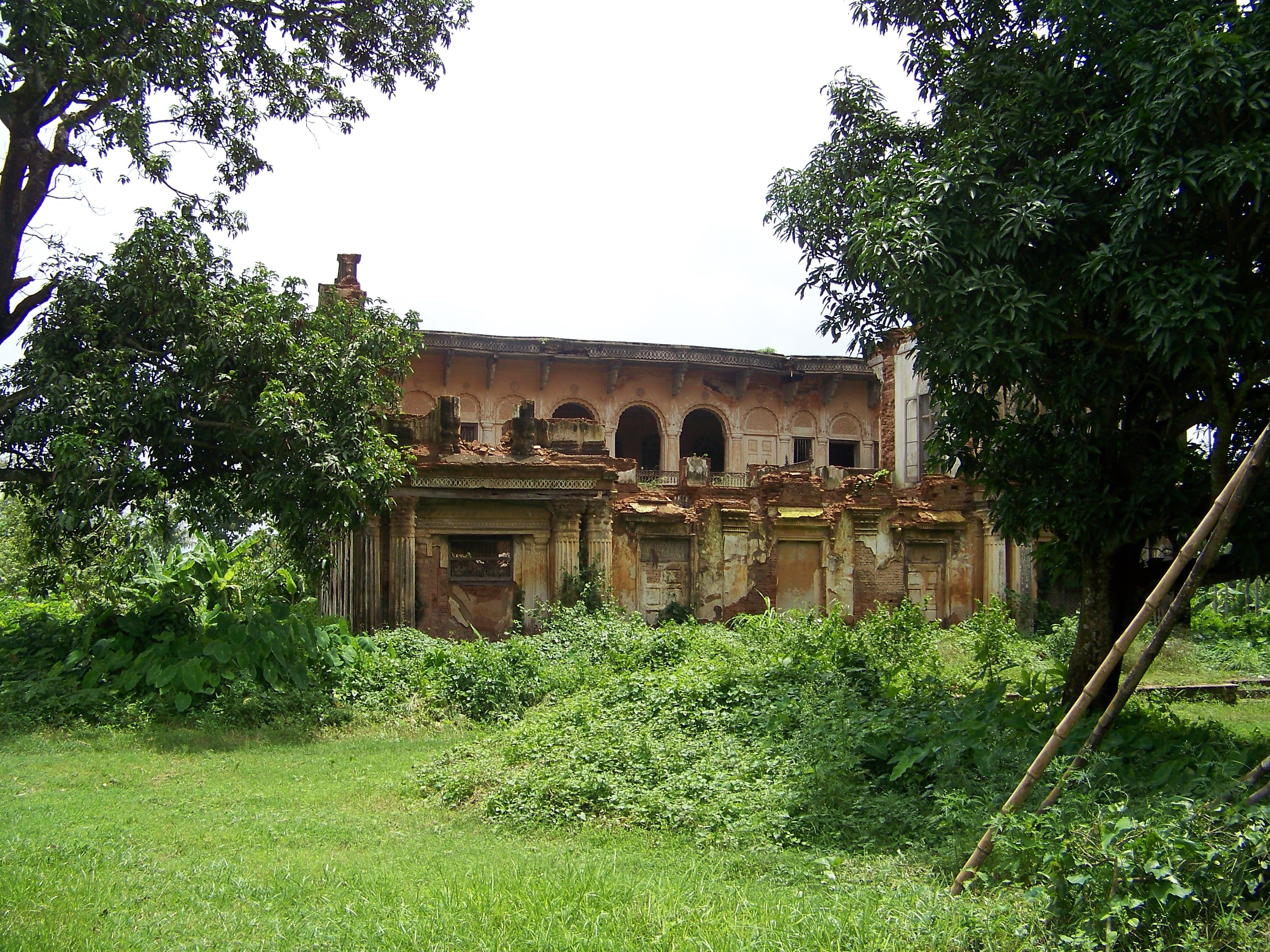
A demolished part of the palace.

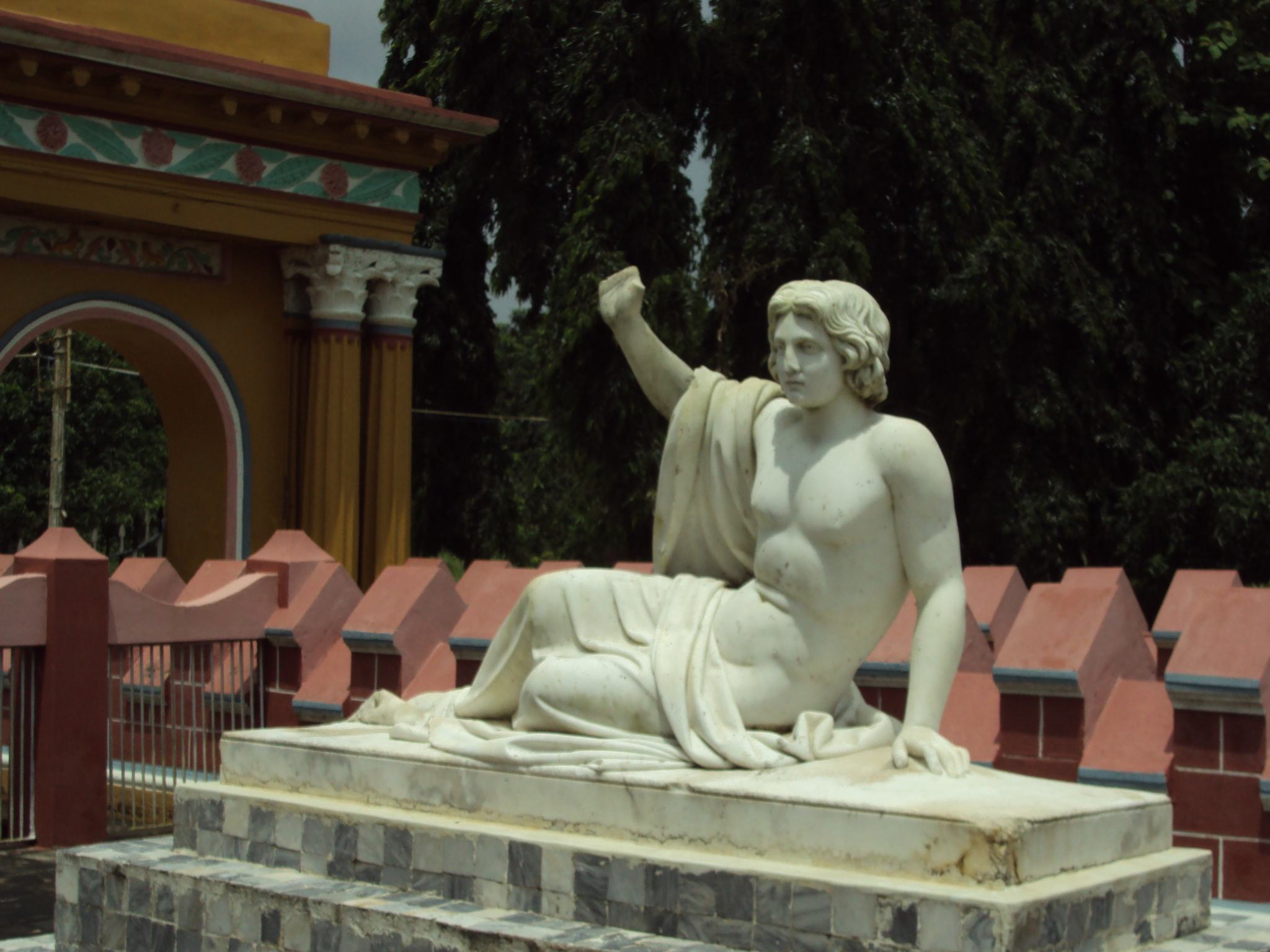
A statue of Michelangelo in the gardens.

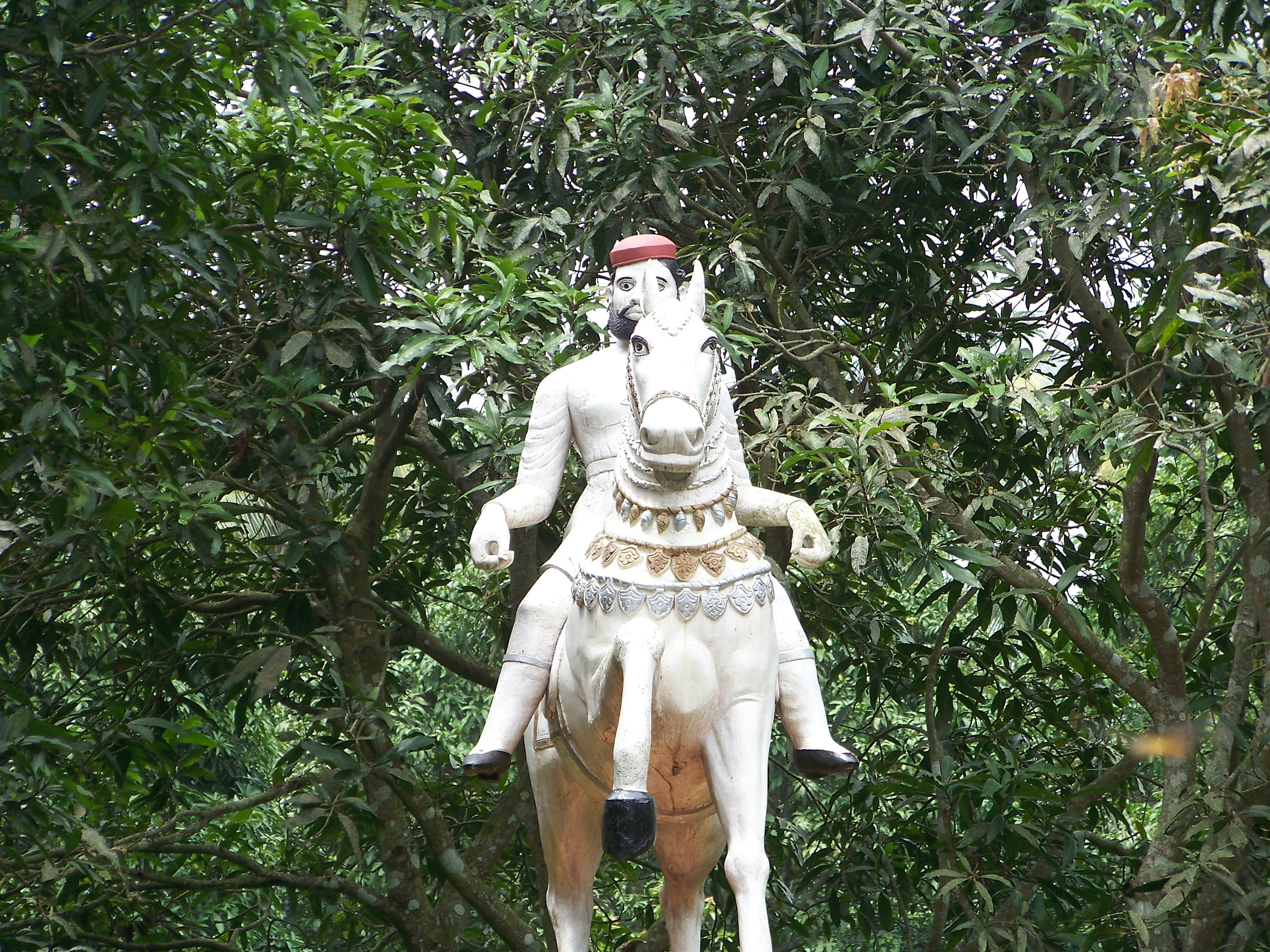
A statue of another brother who built Kathgola.

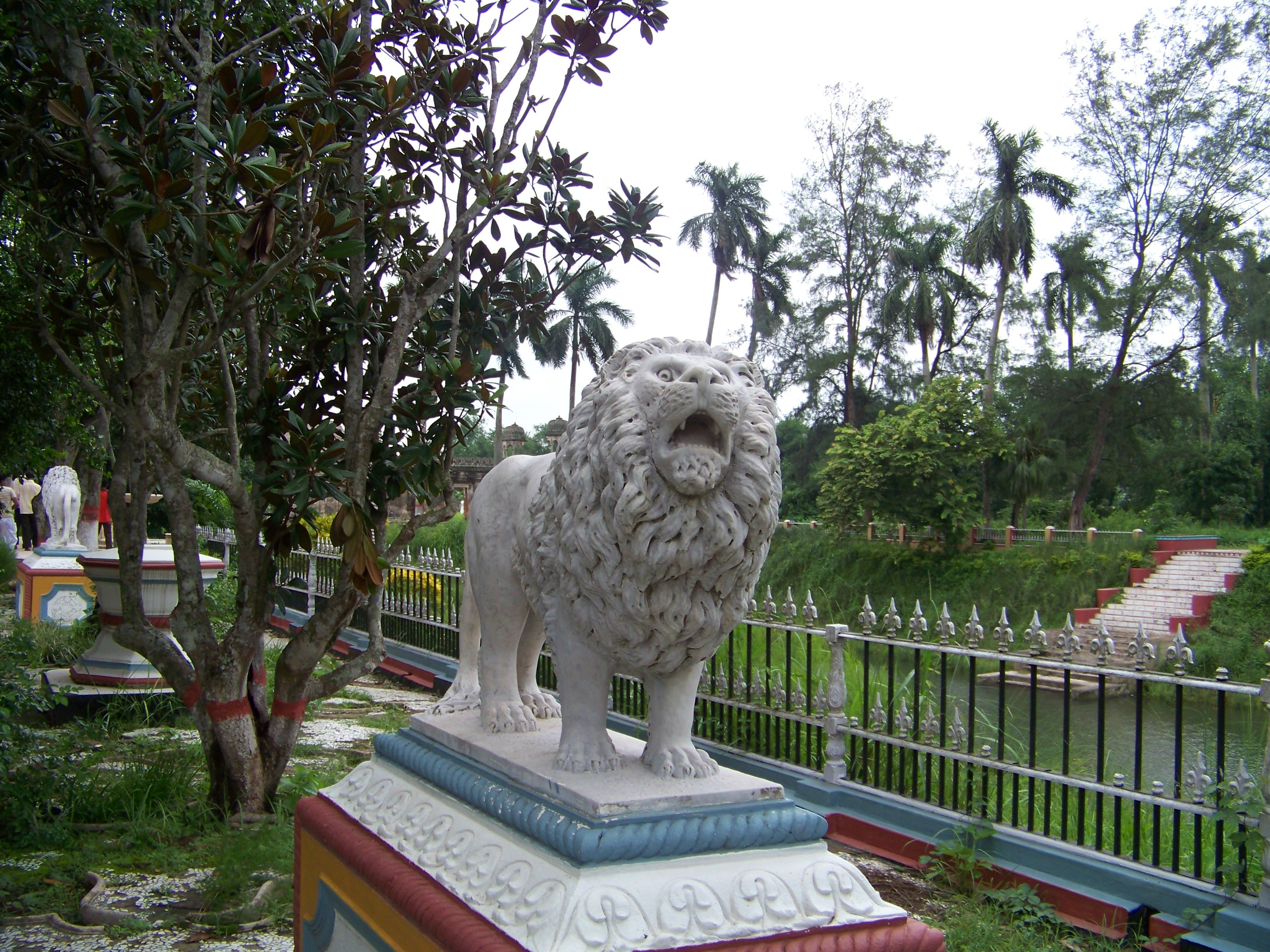
The lion gate (shinghadwar).

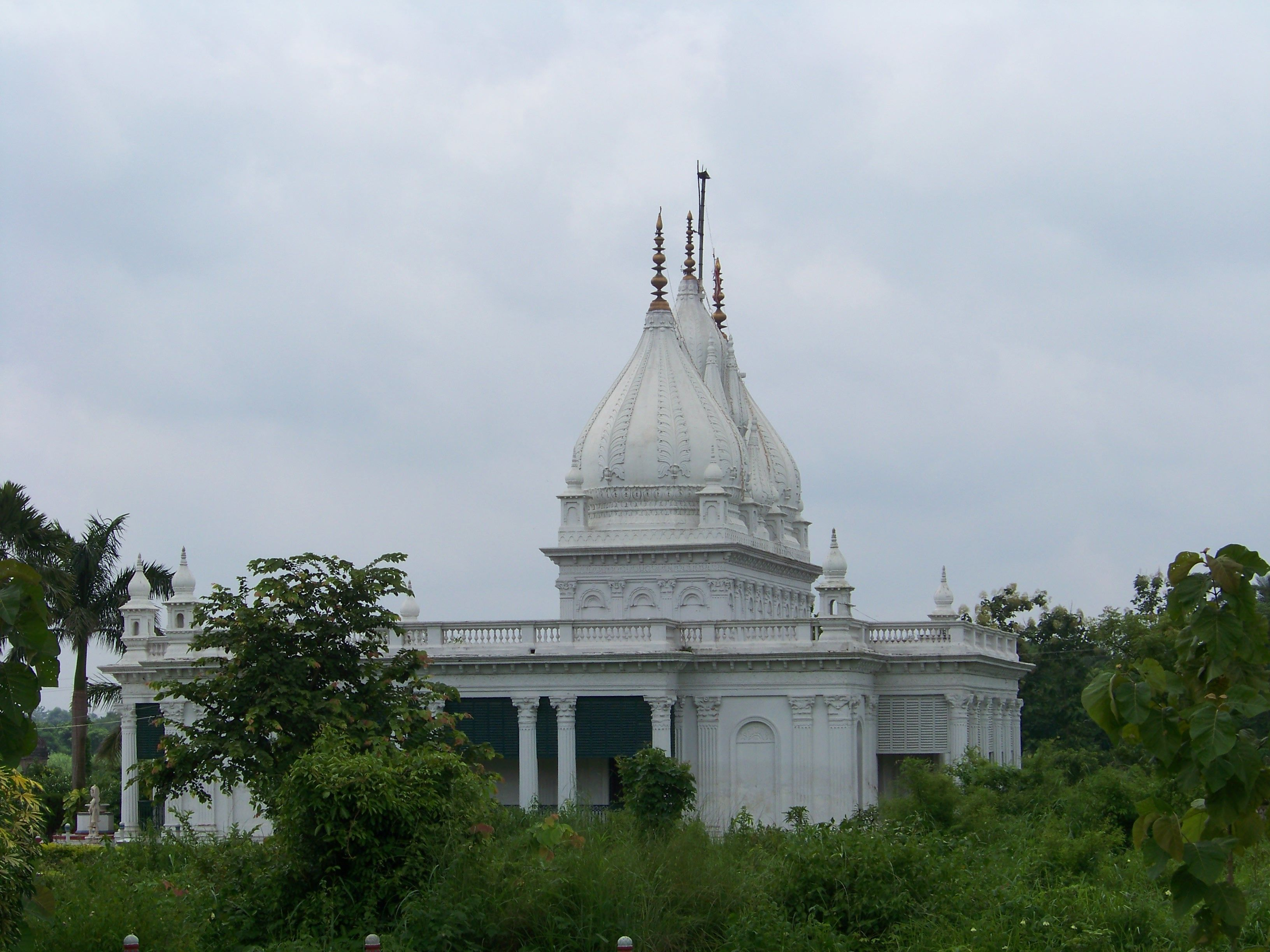
Kathgola Jain temple
