= Rokia Afzal Rahman =

Bangladeshi politician (died 2023)

- রোকেয়া আফজাল রহমান
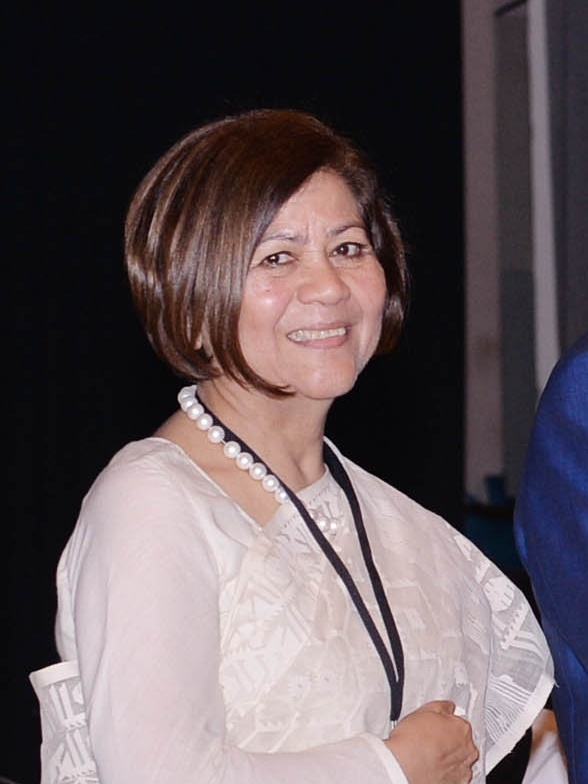
- Rahman in 2016

Adviser for Women and Children Affairs, Social Welfare, Labour, Employment and Cultural Affairs
- In office 15 July 2001 – 10 October 2001
- Prime Minister: Latifur Rahman (Chief Adviser)

Personal details
- Died: 5 April 2023 (aged 82) Singapore
- Spouse: Azimur Rahman (m. 1964)
- Children: 3
- Parent: Khandkar Ali Afzal (father)
- Relatives: Khandakar Fazle Rabbi (grandfather)
- Education: Saint Joseph's College for Women, Karachi

Rokia Afzal Rahman (c. 1941 – 5 April 2023) was a Bangladeshi banker and entrepreneur. She was the first woman bank manager in Bangladesh. She served as one of advisers of the caretaker government of Bangladesh in 2001.

== Background ==
Rokia Afzal was the eighth among 12 siblings of Khandkar Ali Afzal and Syeda Ali Afzal. Khandkar Ali Afzal was a barrister and the first Bengali secretary of the Bengal Legislative Assembly. Rokia's grandfather, Khan Bahadur Khandakar Fazle Rabbi, was a Dewan for the Nawab of Murshidabad. She spent her childhood in Kolkata and Karachi. She studied at Loreto School in Kolkata and Saint Joseph's College for Women in Karachi. In 1995, she took a training in management at Tufts University in Boston.

== Career ==
In 1962, Rahman joined Muslim Commercial Bank (now Rupali Bank) in Karachi and was transferred to Dhaka as bank manager in 1964.

Rahman worked in the banking sector until 1980. She then started an agro-business, R.R. Cold Storage Limited which was involved in importing and exporting of potatoes and storage of seeds and potatoes. She then bought another agro-business company, Imaan Cold Storage Ltd.

In 1994, Women Entrepreneurs Association (WEA) in Bangladesh was formed with 150 members and Rahman was the founding president. In 1996, she founded Women in Small Enterprises (WISE) to promote the role of women in small enterprises and industries. She was the president of the Employers Federation during 1997-1999. She was member of Bangladesh Bank’s board of directors. She was a board member in several organizations including BRAC, Manusher Jonno, BFF, MRDI, Smiling Sun, and Health21.

Rahman served as an adviser for women, children affairs, social welfare, labour, employment and cultural affairs in the Latifur Rahman ministry from 15 July 2001 to 10 October 2001. At the initiative of the women’s affairs ministry at the time, she created an inter-ministerial committee which ensured awareness campaigns in 10 centres where women could cast their votes for the first time.

After her husband's death in 2001, Rahman became the chairperson of Mediaworld Limited, the holding company of The Daily Star. She owned shares in ABC Radio.

Rahman was the chairperson of the board of directors of the Asian University for Women Support Foundation in Bangladesh. She was the founding president of Bangladesh Federation of Women Entrepreneurs and the chairperson of MIDAS Financing Limited. Rahman was the founding chairperson of Presidency University in Dhaka.

Rahman, as the president of Women Entrepreneurs Association (WEA), Bangladesh, signed a memorandum of understanding (MoU) in March 2006 with Rajni Agarwal, president of Federation of Indian Women Entrepreneurs to exchange information on all economic issues with regard to women entrepreneurship development in the two countries.

Rahman was a member of the Business Advisory Council at the United Nations Economic and Social Commission for Asia and the Pacific (ESCAP), and South Asia Women's Network (SWAN).

== Awards ==
- Leading Women Entrepreneurs of the World in Monte Carlo
- Businessperson of the Year by the American Chamber (2003)
- Priyadarshani Award in India

== Personal life and death ==
Rokia married Azimur Rahman, then a tea garden manager in Sylhet on 15 October 1964 and stayed together for 37 years until his death in 2001. They had two daughters, Erum Mariam and Faiza Rahman, and a son, Imran Faiz Rahman. Erum is the executive director of BRAC Institute of Educational Development (IED) and Imran is the director of Mediaworld Limited and Reliance Insurance PLC.

Rokia's sister, Khadija Afzal, served as a vice-president of the Bangladesh Federation of Women Entrepreneurs (BFWE).

Rahman died at Mount Elizabeth Novena Hospital in Singapore on 5 April 2023, at the age of 82.
