= Malihati Talibpur Road railway station =

Railway station in West Bengal, India

General information
- Location: Madhaipur, Malihati Talibpur Road, Murshidabad district, West Bengal; India
- Coordinates: 23°28′25″N 88°44′03″E
- Elevation: 23 m (75 ft)
- System: Passenger train station
- Owner: Indian Railways
- Operator: Eastern Railway zone
- Line: Barharwa–Azimganj–Katwa loop
- Platforms: 2
- Tracks: 2

Construction
- Structure type: Standard (on-ground station)

Other information
- Status: Active
- Station code: MHTR
- Zone(s): Eastern Railway zone
- Division(s): Howrah

History
- Former names: East Indian Railway Company

Services
Preceding station	Indian Railways	Following station
Tenya towards ?	Eastern Railway zone Azimganj–Katwa line	Salar towards ?
Location

Malihati Talibpur railway station is a railway station on the Howrah–Azimganj line of the Howrah railway division of the Eastern Railway zone. It is situated at Malihati Talibpur in Murshidabad district in the Indian state of West Bengal.

== History ==
In 1913, the Hooghly–Katwa Railway constructed a 5 ft 6 in (1,676 mm) broad gauge line from Bandel to Katwa, and the Barharwa–Azimganj–Katwa Railway constructed the 5 ft 6 in (1,676 mm) broad gauge Barharwa–Azimganj–Katwa loop. With the construction of the Farakka Barrage and the opening of the railway bridge in 1971, the railway communication picture of this line was completely changed. There are a total 24 trains, including a few passengers and an EMU stop at Malihati Talibpur Road. The distance between Howrah and Malihati Talibpur railway station is approximately 164 km.
