= Nalini Bagchi =

Indian revolutionary (1896–1918)

Nalinikanta Bagchi
- নলিনীকান্ত বাগচী
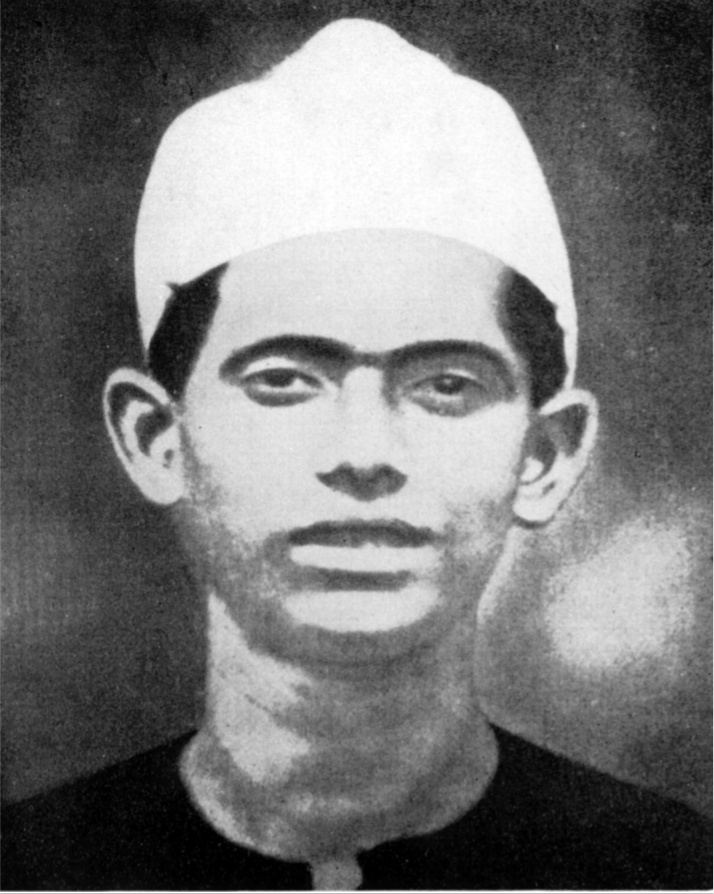
- Born: 1897; Murshidabad
- Died: June 16, 1918 (aged 20–21); Mitford Hospital, Dhaka
- Education: Krishnath College, Bankipur College, Bhagalpur College
- Political party: Jugantar
- Movement: Indian Independence Movement
- Father: Bhubanmohan Bagchi

Nalinikanta Bagchi (1896 – 16 June 1918) was a young Indian revolutionary who sacrificed his life at the age of 22 during the struggle against British Raj. Born in Kanchantala, Murshidabad, he joined the freedom movement while studying at Krishnath College. Fleeing police persecution, he moved through Bihar and Assam, attempting to incite rebellion in the Danapur Cantonment. He evaded capture multiple times and survived smallpox before finally relocating to Dhaka. In January 1918, after a police raid at Kalta Bazar, he was critically wounded in a gunfight along with Tarini Majumdar. He died the same day in Mitford Hospital, Dhaka, remembered as a fearless martyr.

== Early life ==
Born at Kanchanatala in Murshidabad, his father's name is Bhubanmohan Bagchi. He studied at Krishnath College, Bahrampur. Later, he studied at Bankipur College and Bhagalpur College in Patna. While studying at Krishnath College, Berhampore, he joined the revolutionary party of Jugantar. He went to Bankipur College and Bhagalpur College in Patna to avoid getting arrested by the police. He tried to provoke the ideas of freedom struggle among the soldiers of Danapur. He took shelter at Athgaon in Guwahati under the direction of the party. Here, on 12 January 1918, after an armed battle with the police, he and Satish Chandra Pakrashi crossed the police cordon and moved to the forest. He also repulsed another attack on Navagraha hill. Disguised as a Muslim, he reached Lumding station on foot, after seven days of starvation and insomnia. Later he came to Calcutta in a state of smallpox. One of his comrades, saw him lying on the ground and took care of him.

== Encounter and death ==
He then went to Dhaka and but he was again surrounded by the police at Kaltabazar, Dhaka on 15 June 1918. An armed battle began between Nalini and the police. He was severely wounded in the exchange of fire and was arrested. His companion Tariniprasanna Majumdar, who was along with him, was shot dead. Nalini died at Mitford hospital, Dhaka on the same day. Despite police torture before his death, he did not mention his name. One policeman was killed and several others were injured in the fighting. His patron Chaitanya Dey(Aswinikumar Dey) was sentenced to ten years in prison. A road in the town of Berhampore in Murshidabad and a bridge over the Berhampore-Jalangi state road are named in his memory.
