= Chowrigacha railway station =

Railway station in West Bengal, India

General information
- Location: Satui, Chowrigacha, Murshidabad district, West Bengal; India
- Coordinates: 23°33′48″N 88°06′40″E
- Elevation: 19 m (62 ft)
- System: Passenger train station
- Owner: Indian Railways
- Operator: Eastern Railway zone
- Line: Barharwa–Azimganj–Katwa loop
- Platforms: 4
- Tracks: 4

Construction
- Structure type: Standard (on-ground station)

Other information
- Status: Active
- Station code: CWLE
- Zone(s): Eastern Railway zone
- Division(s): Howrah

History
- Rebuilt: yes
- Former names: East Indian Railway Company

Services
Preceding station	Indian Railways	Following station
Kanthaliya Road towards ?	Eastern Railway zone Azimganj–Katwa line	Kazipara Halt towards ?
Location

Chowrigacha railway station is a railway station on the Howrah–Azimganj line of Howrah railway division of Eastern Railway zone. It is situated at Satui, Chowrigacha of Murshidabad district in the Indian state of West Bengal.

== History ==
In 1913, the Hooghly–Katwa Railway constructed a 5 ft 6 in (1,676 mm) broad gauge line from Bandel to Katwa, and the Barharwa–Azimganj–Katwa Railway constructed the 5 ft 6 in (1,676 mm) broad gauge Barharwa–Azimganj–Katwa loop. With the construction of the Farakka Barrage and opening of the railway bridge in 1971, the railway communication picture of this line were completely changed. Total 26 trains including few passengers and EMU stop at Chowrigacha railway station. Distance between Howrah and Chowrigacha railway station is approximately 182 km.
