= Salar railway station =

Railway station in West Bengal, India

Salar railway station সালার স্টেশন सालार स्टेशन

General information
- Location: Kandi-Katwa Road, Salar, Murshidabad, West Bengal; India
- Coordinates: 23°27′46″N 88°38′24″E
- Elevation: 25 m (82 ft)
- System: Express train, Passenger train station
- Owner: Indian Railways
- Operator: Eastern Railway zone
- Lines: Howrah-NJP Loop Line; Barharwa–Azimganj–Katwa loop
- Platforms: 4
- Tracks: 2
- Connections: Broad-gauge railway broader than the 1,435 mm (4 ft 8 1/2 in) standard-gauge railways

Construction
- Structure type: At grade
- Parking: Available

Other information
- Status: Active
- Station code: SALE
- Zone(s): Eastern Railway
- Division(s): Howrah

History
- Former names: East Indian Railway Company

Services
Preceding station	Indian Railways	Following station
Malihati Talibpur Road towards ?	Eastern Railway zone Azimganj–Katwa line	Jhamatpur Baharan towards ?
Location

Salar railway station is a railway station on the Howrah–Azimganj line of Howrah railway division of Eastern Railway zone. It is situated at Salar, Murshidabad in the Indian state of West Bengal.

== History ==
In 1913, the Hooghly–Katwa Railway constructed a 5 ft 6 in (1,676 mm) broad gauge line from Bandel to Katwa, and the Barharwa–Azimganj–Katwa Railway constructed the 5 ft 6 in (1,676 mm) broad gauge Barharwa–Azimganj–Katwa loop. With the construction of the Farakka Barrage and opening of the railway bridge in 1971, the railway communication picture of this line were completely changed. The station electrified in August 2018 . Total 46 trains including number of Express, Passengers and EMU stop at Salar. Distance between Howrah and Salar railway station is approximately 163 km.

== Trains ==
- 13142/Teesta Torsha Express
- 13146/Radhikapur–Kolkata Express
- 15960/Kamrup Express
- 3164/Hate Bazare Express
- 15722/Paharia Express
- 53006/Azimganj–Katwa Passenger
- 63010/Azimganj–Katwa MEMU
- 73036/Nimtita–Katwa DEMU
- 53012/Azimganj–Katwa Passenger (unreserved)
- 13466/Malda Town–Howrah Intercity Express (via Azimganj)
- 53014/Azimganj–Katwa Passenger (unreserved)
- 73032/Azimganj–Katwa DEMU
- 53008/Rampurhat–Katwa Passenger (unreserved)
- 53016/Azimganj–Katwa Passenger (unreserved)
- 73152/Jangipur Road–Sealdah DEMU
- 53018/Azimganj–Katwa Passenger (unreserved)
- 53020/Azimganj–Katwa Passenger (unreserved)
- 13422/Malda Town– Nabadwip Dham Express (unreserved)
- 53436/Azimganj–Katwa Passenger (unreserved)
- 53002/Azimganj–Howrah Passenger (unreserved)
- 13034/Katiha–Howrah Express

== Facilities ==
The facilities available are waiting rooms, computerized reservation facility, reservation counter, and two-wheeler vehicle parking, ATM Counter, Toilets, Tea Stall.
