= Salar, Murshidabad =

Salar
- Census Town
- Location in West Bengal, India Salar (India)
- Coordinates: 23.77482°N 88.102632°E
- Country: India
- State: West Bengal
- District: Murshidabad

Government
  - Type: Federal democracy
  - MP: Yusuf Pathan
  - MLA: Mustafijur Rahaman (Suman)

Area
  - Total: 7.1492 km^{2} (2.7603 sq mi)

Population (2011)
  - Total: 42,594
  - Density: 5,957.9/km^{2} (15,431/sq mi)

Languages
  - Official: Bengali, English
- Time zone: UTC+5:30 (IST)
- PIN: 742401 (Salar)
- Telephone/STD code: 03484
- Vehicle registration: WB57, WB58
- Lok Sabha constituency: Baharampur
- Vidhan Sabha constituency: Bharatpur
- Website: murshidabad.gov.in

Salar is a census town in the Bharatpur II CD block in the Kandi subdivision of Murshidabad district in the state of West Bengal, India.

== Geography ==
Cities, towns and locations in the Berhampore and Kandi subdivisions, Murshidabad district
M: municipal town, CT: census town, R: rural/ urban centre, H: historical centres
Owing to space constraints in the small map, the actual locations in a larger map may vary slightly

=== Location ===
Salar is located at 23.77482°N 88.102632°E.

=== Area overview ===
The area shown in the map alongside, covering Berhampore and Kandi subdivisions, is spread across both the natural physiographic regions of the district, Rarh and Bagri. The headquarters of Murshidabad district, Berhampore, is in this area. The ruins of Karnasubarna, the capital of Shashanka, the first important king of ancient Bengal who ruled in the 7th century, is located 9.6 kilometres (6.0 mi) south-west of Berhampore. The entire area is overwhelmingly rural with over 80% of the population living in the rural areas.

Note: The map alongside presents some of the notable locations in the subdivisions. All places marked in the map are linked in the larger full screen map.

== Demographics ==
According to the 2011 Census of India, Salar had a total population of 42,594, of which 22,600 (53%) were males and 19,994 (47%) were females. Population in the age range 0–6 years was 11,095. The total number of literate persons in Salar was 31,499 (79.10% of the population over 6 years). Muslim population is more than Hindu population.

== Civic administration ==
=== Police station ===
Salar Police Station has jurisdiction over Bharatpur II CD Block.

=== CD Block headquarters ===
The headquarters of Bharatpur II CD block are located near 2 no. Railgate at Salar. The total Block area is 158.50 km^{2} (61.20 sq mi). Total villages are 51 villages and 7 G.P, Kagram, Salar, Simulia, Tenya–Baidyapur, Malihati, Salu and Talibpur.

== Infrastructure ==
According to the District Census Handbook, Murshidabad, 2011, Salar covered an area of 7.1492 km^{2}. It had 18 km roads with open drains. The protected water-supply involved overhead tank, tap water from untreated source etc. It had 3,200 domestic electric connections, 100 road lighting points. Among the medical facilities it had 1 hospital, 1 family welfare centre, 1 veterinary hospital, 1 charitable hospital/ nursing home, 19 medicine shops. Among the educational facilities, it had 11 primary schools, 4 middle schools, 3 secondary schools, 2 senior secondary schools, 1 general degree college. It had 4 recognised shorthand, typewriting & vocational training institutes, 1 non-formal education centre (Sarva Shiksha Abhiyan). Among the social, recreational & cultural facilities it had 1 cinema theatre, 1 public library. It produced beedi, rice. It had the branch offices of 2 nationalised banks, 1 agricultural credit society, 3 non-agricultural credit societies.

== Economy ==
=== Banking and financial services ===
- State Bank of India.
- Allahabad Bank.
- Bank of India.
- Bangiya Gramin Vikash Bank.
- Bandhan Bank.
- United Bank of India.
- Murshidabad District Central Co-operative Bank.

== Transport ==
=== Train ===
Salar railway station is situated on the Howrah-Azimganj line. It connects to the major cities like Kolkata, Siliguri, Guwahati, Dibrugarh, Rampurhat, Malda Town, Katihar, Kishanganj, Alipurduar, Digha, New Jalpaiguri, Radhikapur, saharsa junction .

=== Bus ===
There is a bus terminus named Tridib Chaudhuri Bus Terminus. The Kandi-Katwa Road passes through It has good connection with Baharampore, Katwa, Bolpur, Bardhaman, Asansol.

A NBSTC bus started from Salar to Kolkata. NBSTC bus to Digha and Durgapur stops at Salar. private buses available to Siliguri and North Bengal.

== Education ==
- Salar Edward Zakariah Higher Secondary School
- Salar K.K. Girls High School
- Saleh memorial high school

=== Colleges/ other institutions ===
Muzaffar Ahmed Mahavidyalaya was established in 1986 at Salar. Affiliated with the University of Kalyani it offers courses in Bengali, English, Sanskrit, Arabic, history, geography, political science, sociology and education.

- Shyamangini Kundu College of Education.
- Dali kundu Primary Teachers Training Institute.

=== High schools ===
- Salar E Z Higher Secondary School
- Salar KK Girls High School
- Salar saleh Memorial high school
- Govt.Model School, Bharatpur-II Block
- Senior Rose Mary School
- St. Stephens High School
- Al Hilal Mission
- Al Ameen Mission
- Peace Islamic Academy( A.H. Academy)
- Salar Mallickpara Girls Jr.High School

=== Primary schools ===
- Swarasati Debi public school Salar
- Shemrock Primary Salar
- Salar Kazipara Pry. School
- Salar Adarsha Primary School
- Rose Mary Nursery School
- Salar Mallick Para S. M. Jr. Basic School
- Saraswati public school
- Little Angel Public School
- Salar Gurukul nursery school
- Radix Mission
- Salar K.K Girls Primary School

== Culture ==
The main festivals of Salar are:

- Eid
- Muharram
- Jagadhatri Puja
- Durga Puja

Besides, there are three fair celebrations organized every year. The biggest fair is the Pilkhundi Fair. The other two are Muharram Fair and Mallickpara Fair.

=== Foods ===
Salar is famous in Murshidabad for delicious Muslim dishes like Seekh Kebab, Tanduri Roti, Halwa, Nalli Nihari, Liver, Brain Fry, Kofta, Tikkia, Mangso Kosha etc.

== Healthcare ==
Salar Rural Hospital functions with 30 beds. Beside it, nearby hospital is Katwa sub-divisional Hospital and Kandi sub-divisional Hospital.

== Notable people ==
- Khandakar Fazle Rabbi - The Dewan of the Nawab of Murshidabad
- Abul Barkat - Language rights activist and Martyr of 21 February Bangali Language Movement
