= Tenya railway station =

Railway station in West Bengal, India

General information
- Location: Tenya, Murshidabad district, West Bengal; India
- Coordinates: 23°29′31″N 88°51′21″E
- Elevation: 19 m (62 ft)
- System: Passenger train station
- Owner: Indian Railways
- Operator: Eastern Railway zone
- Line: Barharwa–Azimganj–Katwa loop
- Platforms: 4
- Tracks: 2

Construction
- Structure type: Standard (on ground station)

Other information
- Status: Active
- Station code: TYAE
- Zone(s): Eastern Railway zone
- Division(s): Howrah

History
- Former names: East Indian Railway Company

Services
Preceding station	Indian Railways	Following station
Miangram towards ?	Eastern Railway zone Azimganj–Katwa line	Malihati Talibpur Road towards ?
Location

Tenya railway station is a railway station on the Howrah–Azimganj line of Howrah railway division of Eastern Railway zone in India. It is situated at Tenya in Murshidabad district in the state of West Bengal.

== History ==
In 1913, the Hooghly–Katwa Railway constructed a 5 ft 6 in (1,676 mm) broad gauge line from Bandel to Katwa, and the Barharwa–Azimganj–Katwa Railway constructed the 5 ft 6in broad gauge Barharwa–Azimganj–Katwa loop. With the construction of the Farakka Barrage and opening of the railway bridge in 1971, the railway communication picture of this line were completely changed.

26 trains including a few passenger trains and EMU stop at Tenya. The distance between Howrah and Tenya railway station is approximately 168 kilometres (104 mi).
