= Murshidabad =

City in West Bengal

Murshidabad Makhsudabad Lal Bagh
- Town
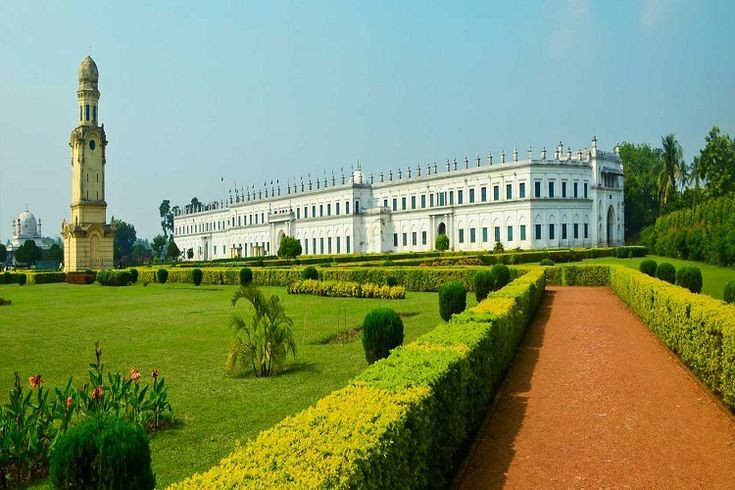
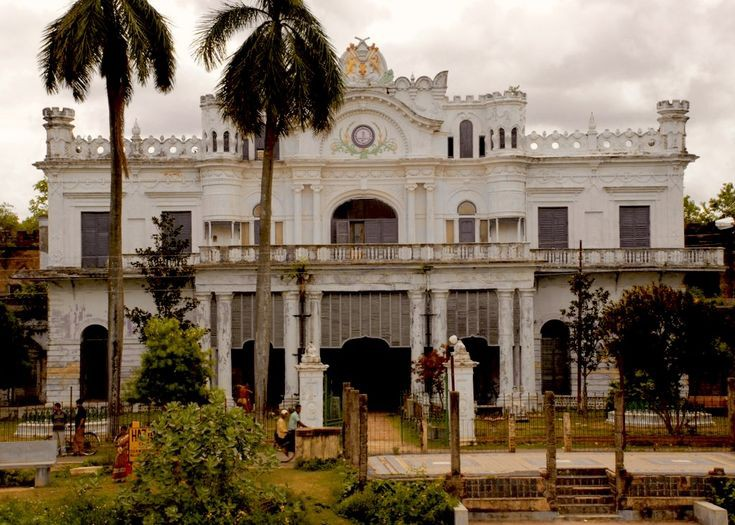
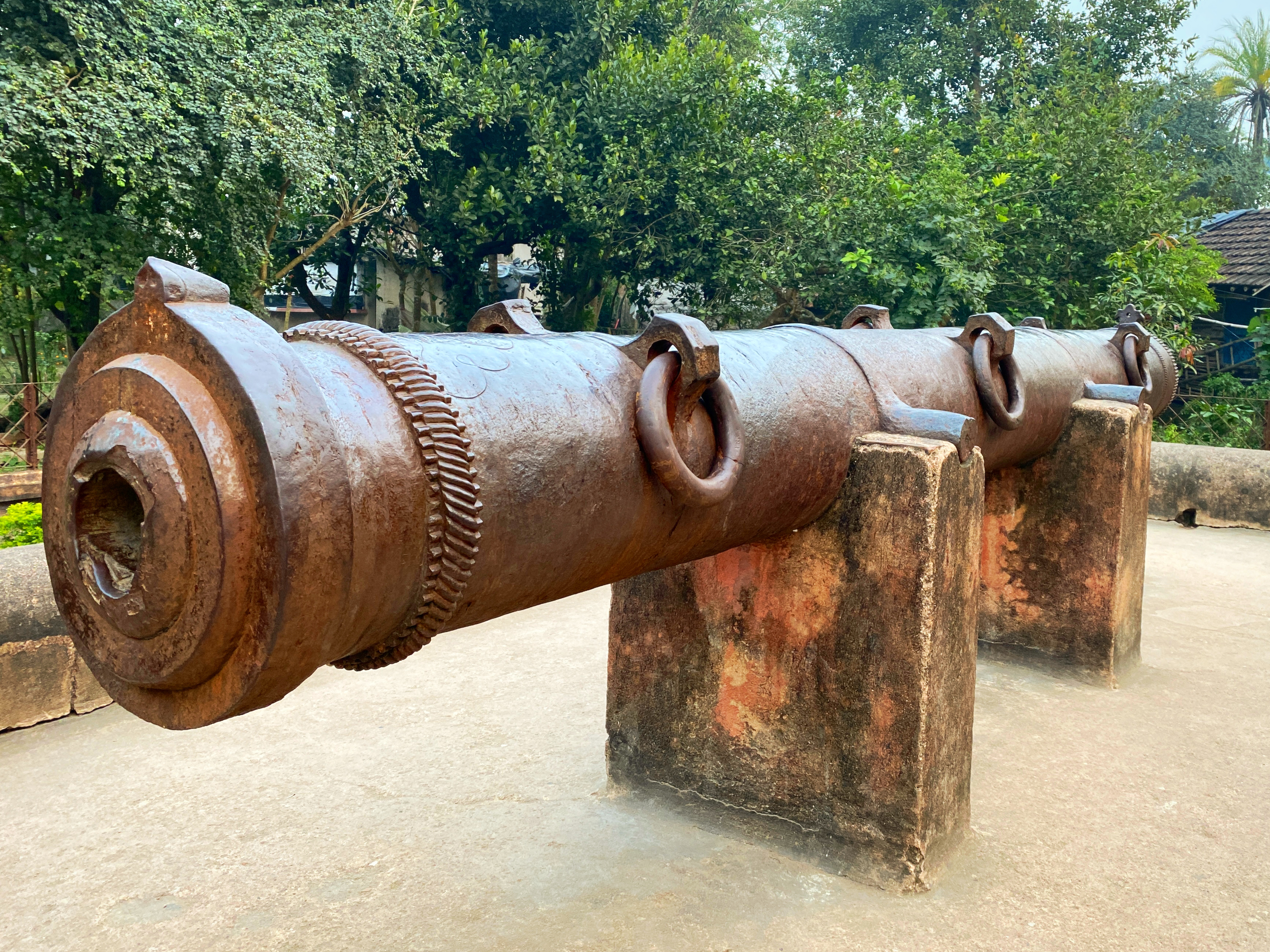
- Nizamat Imambara Wasif Manzil Jahan Kosha Cannon

- Location in West Bengal, India Murshidabad (India)
- Coordinates: 24.18°N 88.27°E
- Country: India
- State: West Bengal
- District: Murshidabad
- Named for: Murshid Quli Khan

Government
  - Type: Municipality
  - Body: Murshidabad Municipality
  - Chairperson: Lalita Das Nandi (AITC)
  - Lok Sabha MP: Abu Taher Khan (NCPI)
  - MLA: Gouri Shankar Ghosh (BJP)

Area
  - Total: 17.25 km^{2} (6.66 sq mi)
- Elevation: 10 m (33 ft)

Population (2011)
  - Total: 44,019
  - Density: 2,552/km^{2} (6,609/sq mi)

Languages
  - Official: Bengali
  - Additional official: English
- Time zone: UTC+5:30 (IST)
- PIN: 742149
- Telephone code: 91-3482-2xxxxx
- Vehicle registration: WB-57, WB-58
- Lok Sabha constituency: Murshidabad
- Vidhan Sabha constituency: Murshidabad
- Website: murshidabad.nic.in

Murshidabad (Bengali pronunciation: [murʃidabad]) is a town in the Indian state of West Bengal. This town is the headquarters of Lalbag subdivision of Murshidabad district. It is located on the eastern bank of the Bhagirathi River. During the 18th century, Murshidabad was a prosperous and cosmopolitan town. Murshidabad was the capital of the Bengal Subah for seventy years. This town was the home of wealthy banking and merchant families from different parts of the Indian subcontinent and wider Eurasia. European companies, including the British East India Company, the French East India Company, the Dutch East India Company and the Danish East India Company, conducted business and operated factories around the city. The town was also a centre of art and culture.

The city's decline began with the defeat of the last independent Nawab of Bengal Siraj-ud-Daulah at the Battle of Plassey in 1757. The Nawab was demoted to the status of a zamindar known as the Nawab of Murshidabad. The British shifted the treasury, courts and revenue office to Calcutta. In the 19th century, the population was estimated to be 46,000. Murshidabad became a district headquarters of the Bengal Presidency. It was declared as a municipality in 1869.

== Etymology ==
Murshidabad was named after its founder, Nawab Murshid Quli Khan. Murshid is an Arabic term for a teacher or guide with integrity, sensibility, and maturity. The suffix -abad is derived from the Persian word abad, which referred to a cultivated place.

== Geography ==
Murshidabad
F: facility, H: historical site
Owing to space constraints in the small map, the actual locations in a larger map may vary slightly

=== Location ===
Murshidabad is located at 24.18°N 88.27°E.

Hazarduari Palace and its associated sites in the Kila Nizamat area (forming the central area in the map alongside) is the centre of attraction in Murshidabad. Just a little away are Katra Masjid, Fauti Mosque, Jama Masjid, and the Motijhil area. There is a group of attractions in the northern part of the town (as can be seen in the map alongside). Some attractions such as Khushbagh, Rosnaiganj, Baranagar, Kiriteswari Temple, Karnasuvarna and others are on the other side of the river and there are attractions in the neighbouring Berhampore area also (not shown in the map).

Note: The map alongside presents some of the notable locations in Murshidabad city. Most of the places marked in the map are linked in the larger full screen map. A few, without pages yet, remain unmarked. The map has a scale. It will help viewers to find out the distances.

== History ==
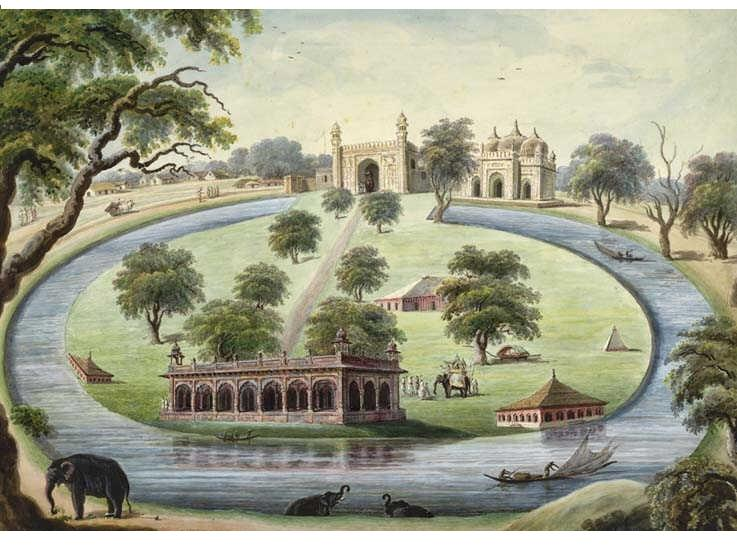
Painting of the garden, mosque and prince's pavilions in Motijhil (pearl lake)

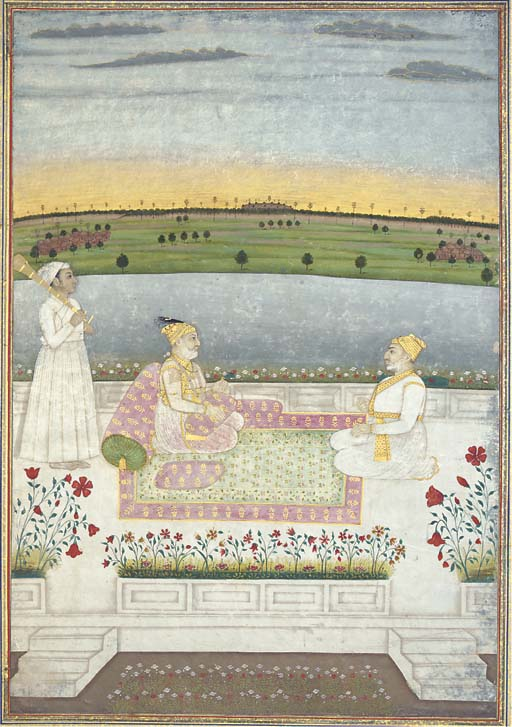
Nawab Alivardi Khan with a courtier, painted in the Company Style, where it first emerged in Murshidabad

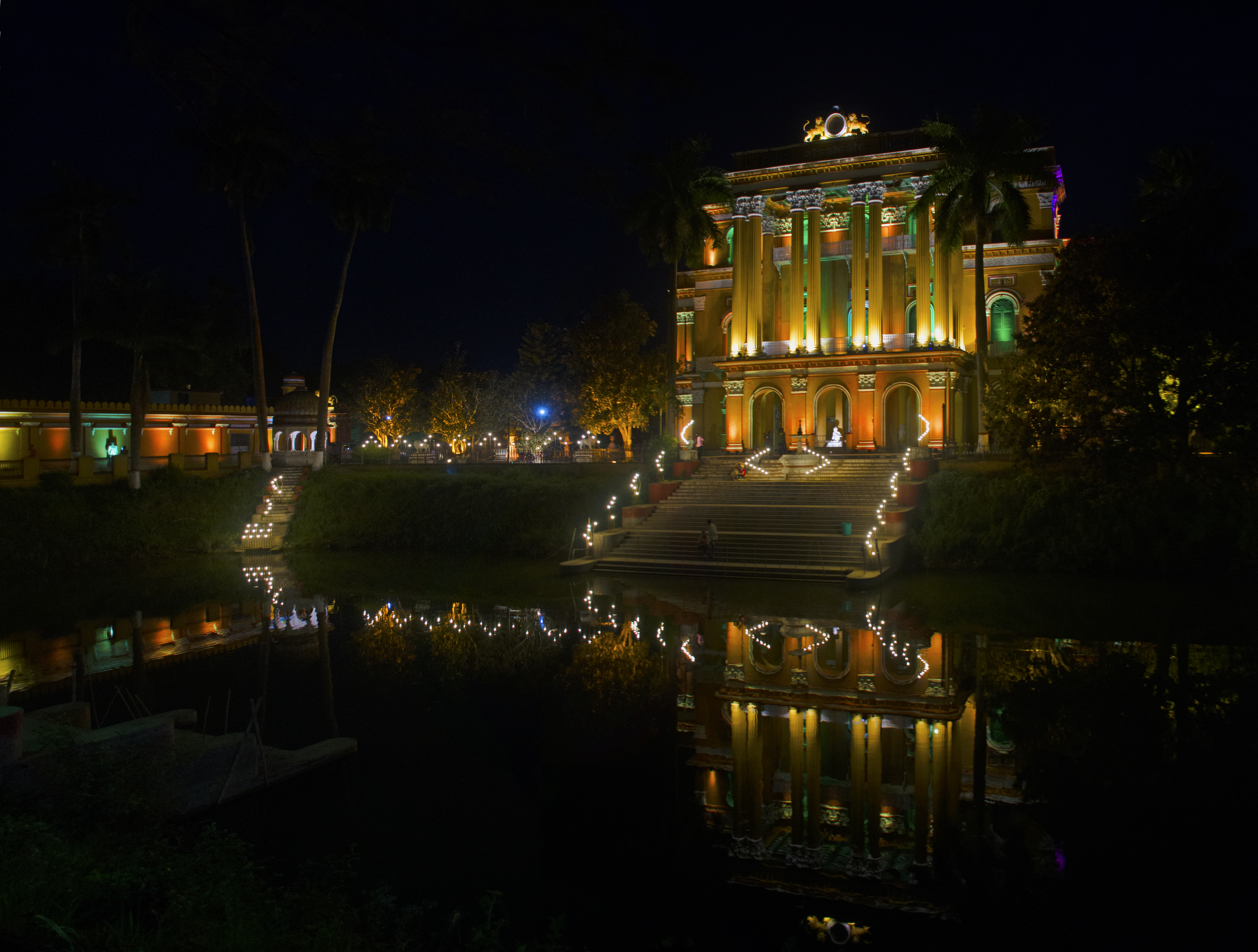
Illuminated Katgola Palace at night

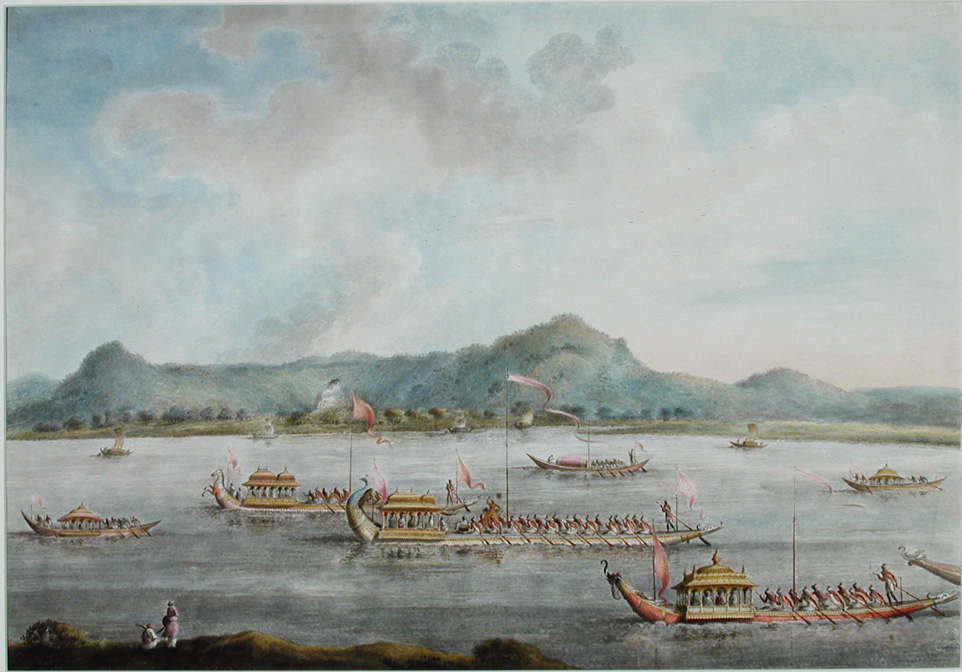
The Nawab's boats on a river

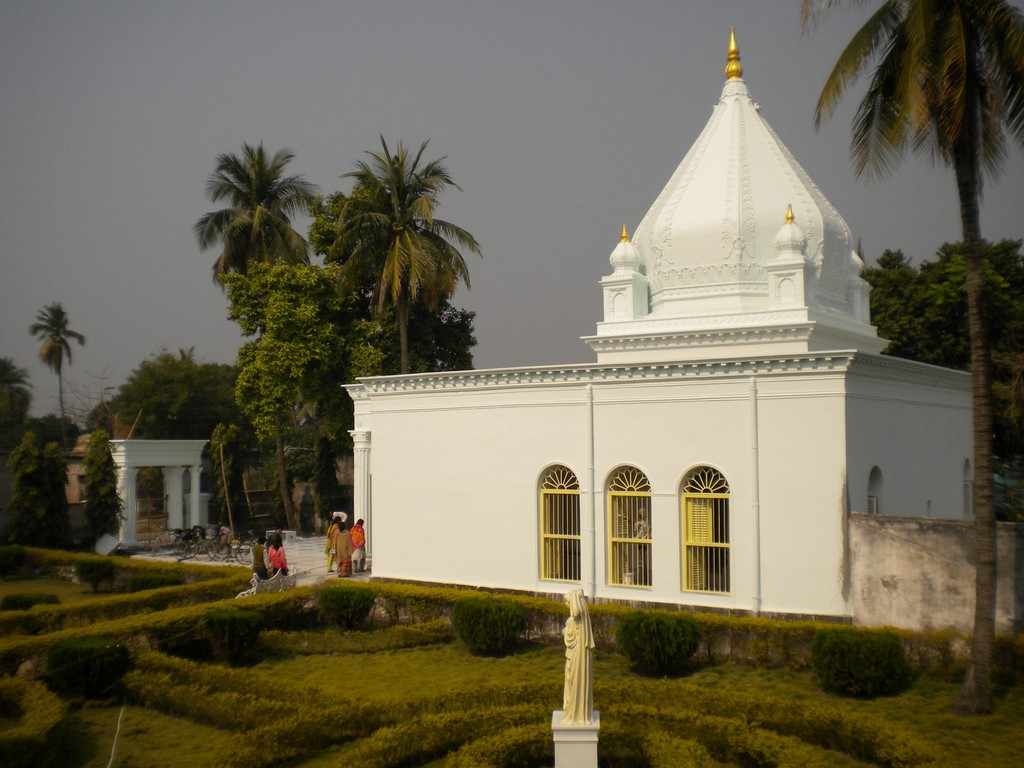
A Jain temple in the mansion of Jagat Seth, a historically prominent banking family of Murshidabad

The area was part of the Gauda Kingdom and Vanga Kingdom in ancient Bengal. The Riyaz-us-Salatin credited the initial development of the town to a merchant named Makhsus Khan. The merchant's role is also mentioned in the Ain-i-Akbari.

During the 17th-century, the area was well known for sericulture. In 1621, English agents reported that large quantities of silk were available in the area. During the 1660s, it became a pargana of the Mughal administration, with jurisdiction over European companies in Cossimbazar.

In the early 18th-century, Murshid Quli Khan, the prime minister of Bengal Subah, had a bitter rivalry with Prince Azim-ush-Shan, the viceroy of Bengal. The latter even attempted to have Khan killed. The Mughal court in Delhi was also rapidly losing authority in much of the subcontinent. Amid the decline of the central government, the Mughal Emperor Farrukhsiyar promoted Khan to the status of a princely Nawab. As Nawab, Khan was given the opportunity to create a princely dynasty as part of the Mughal aristocracy.

Murshid Quli Khan shifted the capital of Bengal from Dhaka, which lost its strategic importance after the expulsion of the Arakanese and Portuguese from Chittagong. He founded the city of Murshidabad and named the city after himself. It became the centre of political, economic and cultural life in Bengal. The jurisdiction of the Nawab included not only Bengal, but also Bihar and Orissa. Murshidabad was also located centrally in the expanded jurisdiction of Bengal, Bihar and Orissa.

The presence of the princely court, the Mughal Army, artisans and multiethnic merchants increased the wealth of Murshidabad. Wealthy families and companies established their head offices in the city. The Murshidabad mint became the largest in Bengal, with a value amounting to two percent of the minted currency. The city witnessed the construction of administrative buildings, gardens, palaces, mosques, temples and mansions. European companies operated factories in the city's outskirts. The city was full of brokers, workers, peons, naibs, wakils, and ordinary traders.

Murshid Quli Khan transformed Murshidabad into a capital city with an efficient administrative machinery for his successors. He built a palace and a caravanserai with a grand mosque, known as the Katra Masjid. The main military base was located near the mosque and formed the city's eastern gateway. The third Nawab Shuja-ud-Din Muhammad Khan patronized the construction of another palace and military base, a new gateway, the revenue office, a public audience hall (durbar), a private chamber, the treasury and a mosque in an extensive compound called Farrabagh (Garden of Joy) which included canals, fountains, flowers, and fruit trees.

Nawab Siraj-ud-Daulah established a palace near the Motijhil (Pearl Lake). The Nizamat Imambara was built for Shia Muslims. The palace complex was fortified and known as the Nizamat Fort. The main entrances of the Nizamat Fort had musicians' galleries. The gates were high, imposing and tall enough for an elephant to pass through. The Khoshbagh garden was the burial place of the Nawabs. The city had a Bengali majority population, including Bengali Muslims and Bengali Hindus. There was an influential Jain community involved in trade and commerce. An Armenian community also settled and became financiers for the Nawab. The Jagat Seth family was one of the prominent banking families of Murshidabad. They controlled money lending activities and served as financiers for administrators, merchants, traders, the Nawabs, the Zamindars, as well as the British, French, Armenians and Dutch. The merchants built many mansions, including the Azimganj Rajbati, Kathgola house and Nashipur house.

The Nawabs of Bengal entered into agreements with numerous European trading companies allowing them to establish bases in the region. The French East India Company operated factories in Murshidabad and Dhaka. The British East India Company was based in Fort William. Murshidabad was a part of the Dutch Bengal Department. The Ostend Company of Austria established a base near Murshidabad. The Danish East India Company also set up trading posts in the Bengal Subah.

The last independent Nawab, Siraj-ud-Daulah was defeated in the Battle of Plassey in 1757. Despite receiving assurances of French support, the Nawab was betrayed by his commander Mir Jafar. The British installed Mir Jafar's family as a puppet dynasty and eventually reduced the Nawab to the status of a landlord (zamindar). The British continued to collect revenue from the area's factories. The merchant families continued to prosper under company rule in India. In 1858, the British government gained direct control of India's administration.

Murshidabad was very badly affected by the Bengal Famine of 1770.

Murshidabad was a district city of the Bengal Presidency. Warren Hastings removed the supreme civil and criminal courts to Calcutta in 1772, but in 1775 the latter courts were brought back to Murshidabad again. In 1790, under Lord Cornwallis, the entire revenue and judicial staffs were moved to Calcutta. The city was still the residence of the Nawab, who ranked as the first nobleman of the province with the style of Nawab Bahadur of Murshidabad, instead of Nawab Nazim of Bengal. The Hazarduari Palace was built in 1837 as a residence for both the Nawab and British civil servants. Murshidabad became a municipality in 1869. The population in 1901 was 15,168. The silk industry was revived with assistance from the government. The area also became notable for mango and litchi production.

See also - Nawabs of Bengal and Murshidabad

Art of Murshidabad

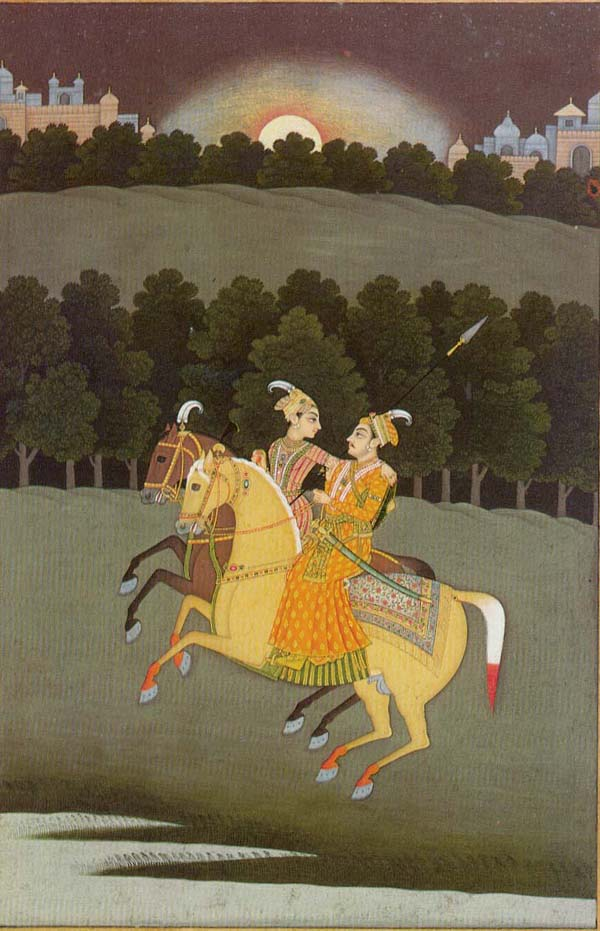
Two horsemen, Murshidabad style of painting

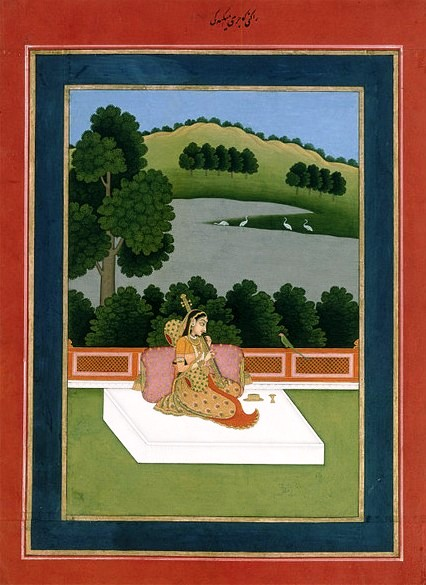
Woman playing the sitar, Murshidabad style of painting

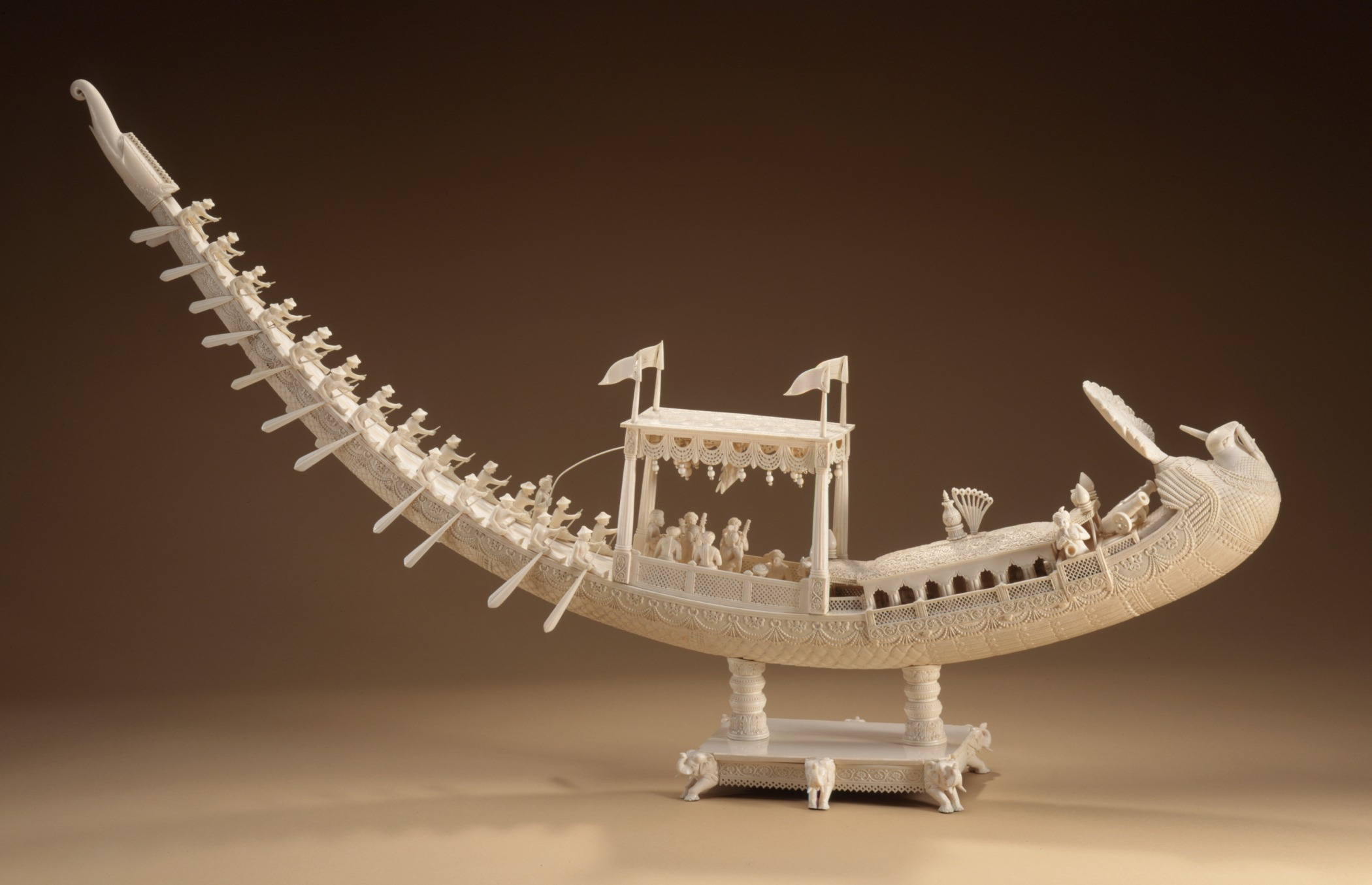
Ivory sculpture of a royal barge

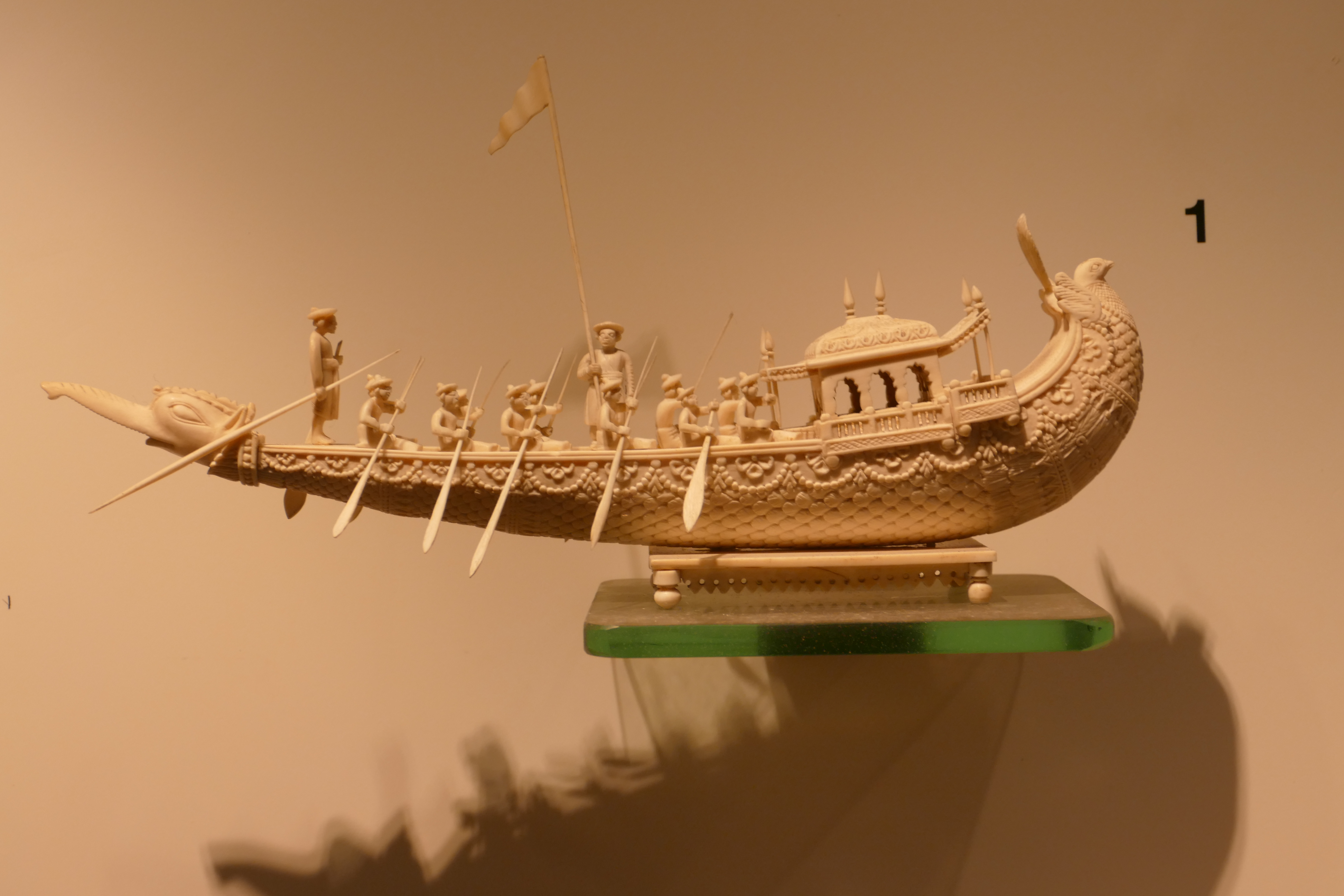
Ivory sculpture of a royal barge

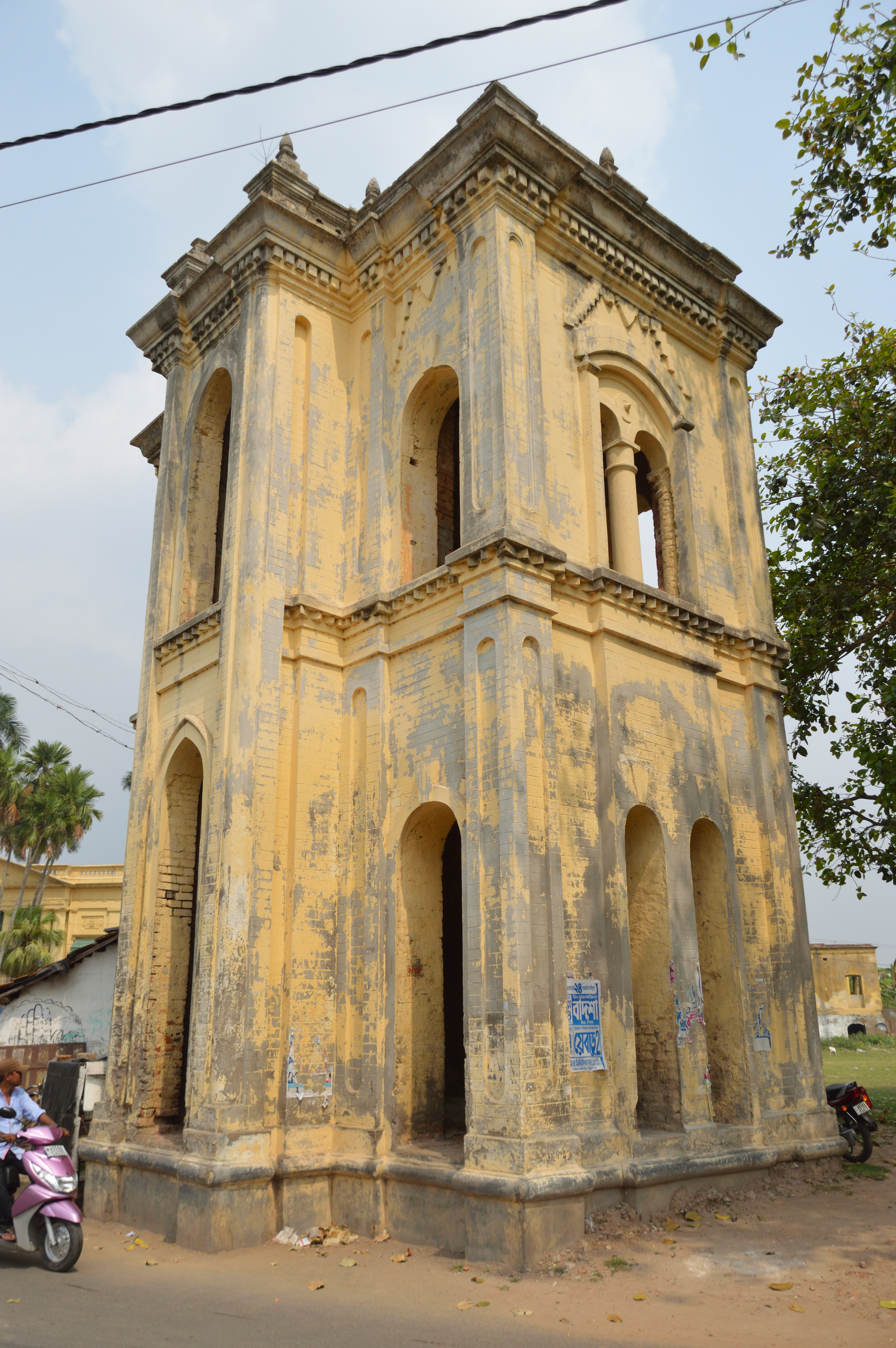
An elevated musicians' gallery where drums, flutes and Indian classical music would be played.

== Economy ==
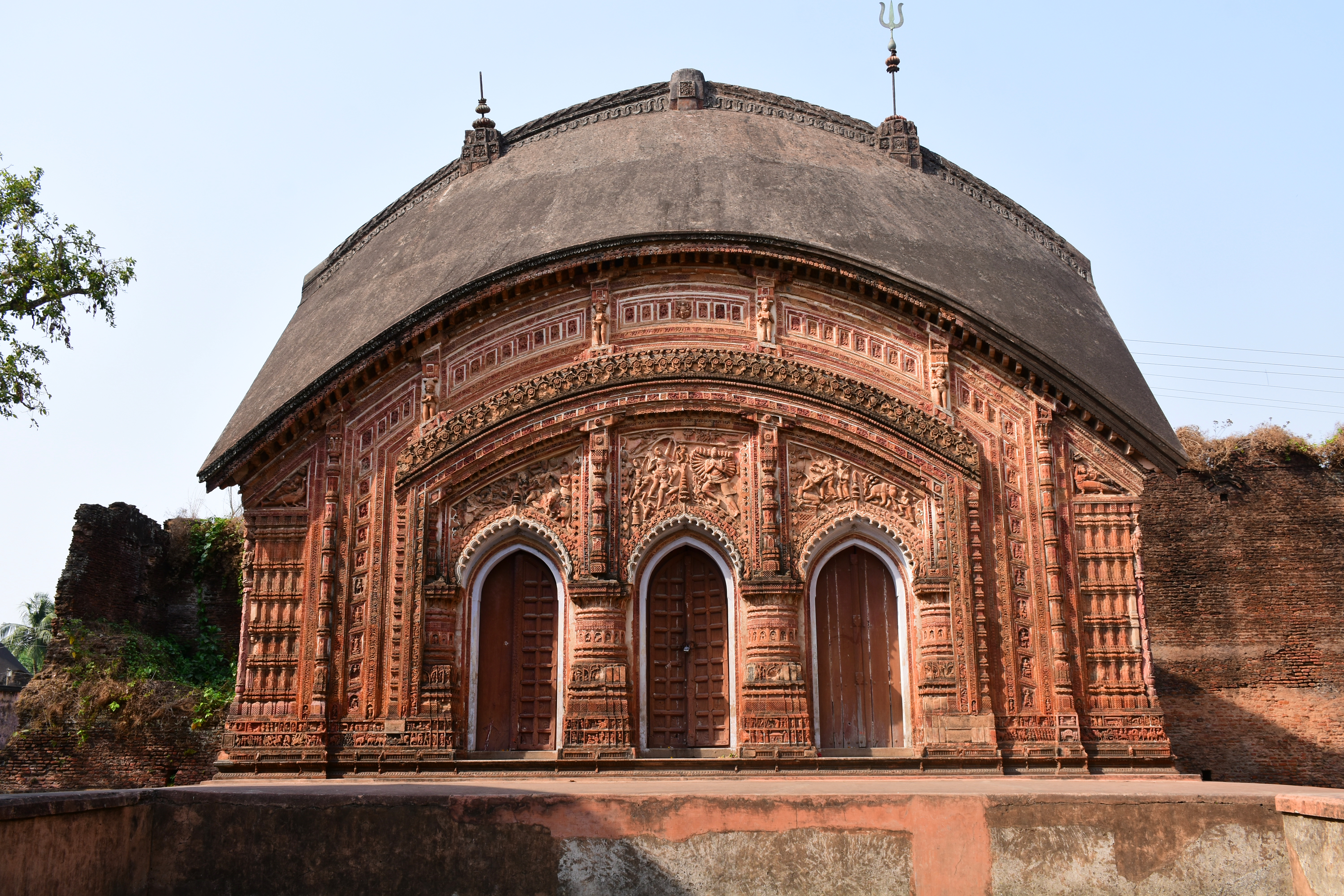
Murshidabad District has several terracotta Bengali Hindu temples

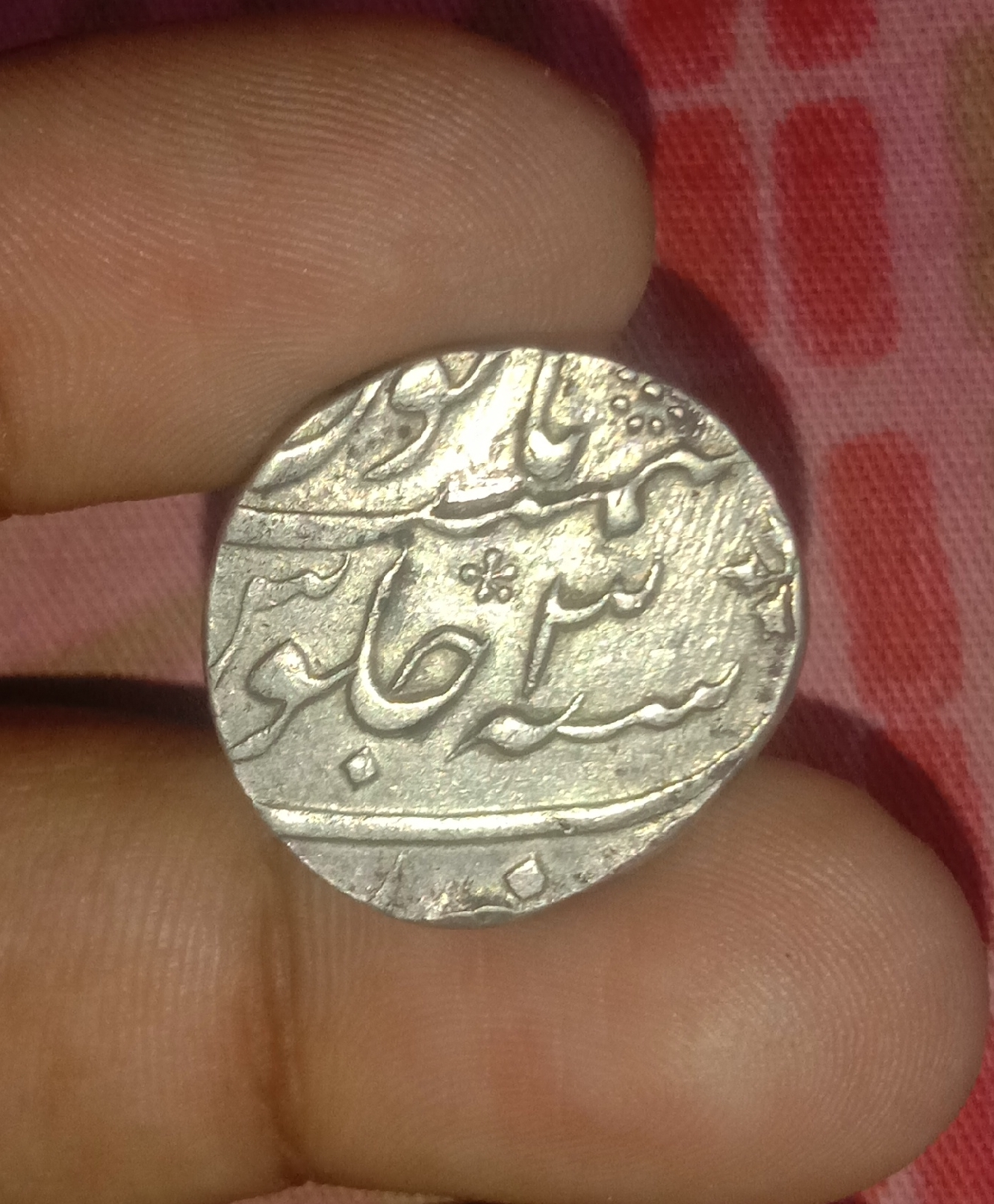
Silver Rupee struck during the tenure of Bengal Nawab Alivardi Khan in Murshidabad mint, in the name of Mughal emperor Ahmad Shah Bahadur, with his regnal year 3 in Persian, AD 1751.

The city today is a centre for agriculture, handicrafts and sericulture. The famous Murshidabad silk, much in demand for making saris and scarves, is produced here.

== Demographics ==
As of 2011 Indian Census, Murshidabad had a total population of 44,019, of which 22,177 were males and 21,842 were females. Population within the age group of 0 to 6 years was 4,414. The total number of literates in Murshidabad was 32,451, which constituted 73.7% of the population with male literacy of 77.3% and female literacy of 70.1%. The effective literacy rate of 7+ population of Murshidabad was 81.9%, of which male literacy rate was 86.0% and female literacy rate was 77.9%. The Scheduled Castes and Scheduled Tribes population was 13,762 and 302 respectively. Murshidabad had 9829 households in 2011.According to 2011 census the religious make-up of Murshidabd city was: Hindus (75.09%), Muslims (23.86%) and others (1.05%)

== Educational institutes ==
=== Schools ===
- Raghunathganj High School (10+2)
- Sargachi Ramakrishna Mission High School
- Srikantabati P.S.S. Sikshaniketan

=== Colleges ===
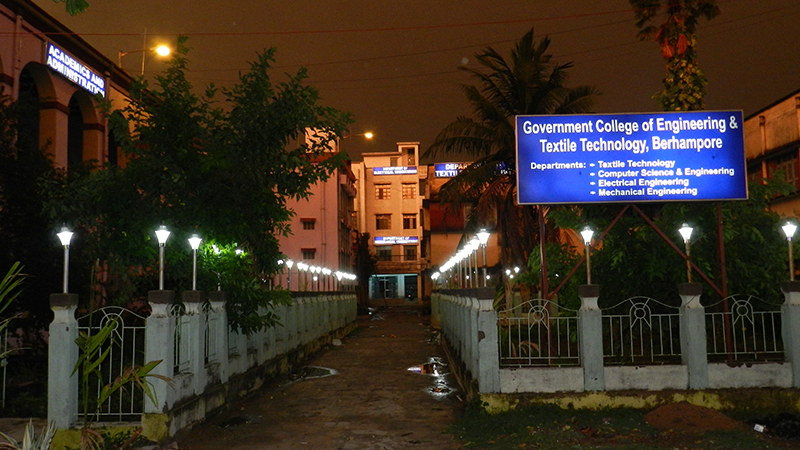
Government College of Engineering & Textile Technology, Berhampore

- Berhampore College
- Berhampore Girls' College
- Dukhulal Nibaran Chandra College
- Dumkal Institute of Engineering & Technology
- Government College of Engineering & Textile Technology, Berhampore
- Jakir Hossain Institute of Polytechnic, Hafania, Suti II
- Jangipur College
- Kandi Raj College
- Krishnath College
- Management Development Institute Murshidabad
- Murshidabad College of Engineering & Technology
- Murshidabad Institute of Technology
- Murshidabad Medical College and Hospital
- Nur Mohammad Smriti Mahavidyalaya
- Prof. Syed Nurul Hasan College
- Rani Dhanya Kumari College
- Sripat Singh College
- Subhas Chandra Bose Centenary College

=== Universities ===
- Aligarh Muslim University Murshidabad Centre
- Murshidabad University, Berhampore

== Murshidabad Heritage Festival ==
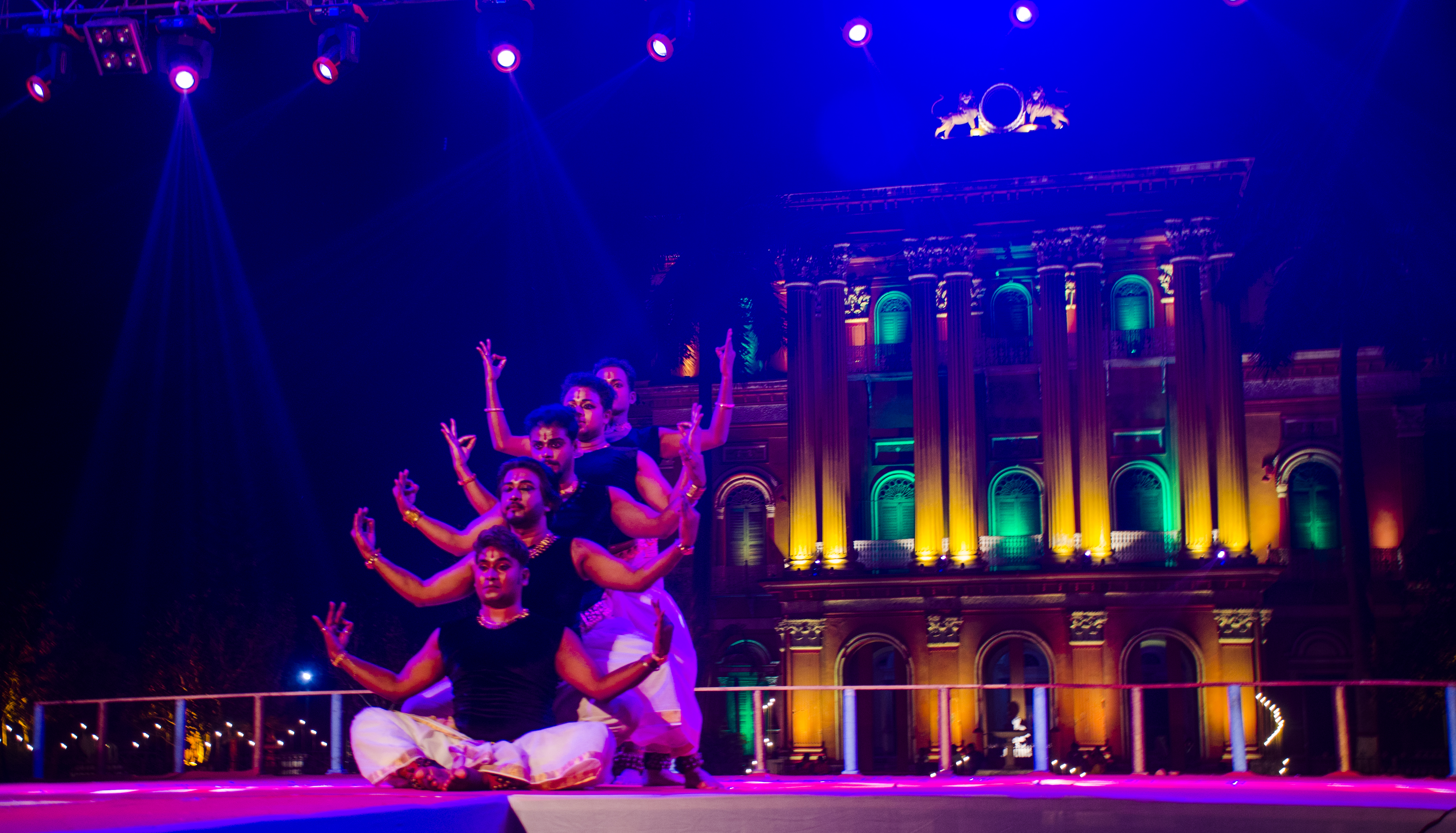
Dance performance in Kathgola gardens during the Murshidabad Heritage Festival

The Murshidabad Heritage Festival aims at reviving the tangible and intangible heritage of Murshidabad along with those nearby heritage towns of Azimganj, Jiaganj and Cossimbazar. The festival aims at preserving the past and integrating it with the present and to bring Murshidabad back in the tourism, cultural and heritage map of India. It is an initiative of Murshidabad Heritage Development Society (MHDS). The festival began in 2011 and has been celebrated ever since. There are no fixed days for the festival but it is celebrated during the winter season, especially during January or February. The festival is complete with cultural performances, heritage walks, cruise along the Bagirati River and exotic food. The Food served during the festival is purely vegetarian, with special emphasis on Sheherwali cuisine.

== Notable residents ==
- Abdul Alim
- Abul Barkat
- Abul Hayat
- Abul Bashar
- Abul Hasan Quraishi
- Amiya Kumar Bagchi
- Arijit Singh
- Arup Chandra
- Babar Ali
- Badshah Moitra
- Basu Bhattacharya
- Farida Yasmin
- Govindadasa
- Iskander Mirza
- Karuna Bhattacharya
- Mahasweta Devi
- Manish Ghatak
- Mir Afsar Ali
- Murshid Kuli Khan
- Nabarun Bhattacharya
- Nirupama Devi
- Rakhaldas Bandyopadhyay
- Ramendra Sundar Tribedi
- Sarat Chandra Pandit
- Shreya Ghoshal
- Siraj ud-Daulah
- Syed Mustafa Siraj
- Nalini Bagchi
- Tapan Sinha
