= Najabat Ali Khan =

Najabat Ali Khan Bahadur
- Saif-ul-mulk (Sword of the Country); Suja-ud-Daulah (Hero of the State); Shahmat Jang (Arrow in war)
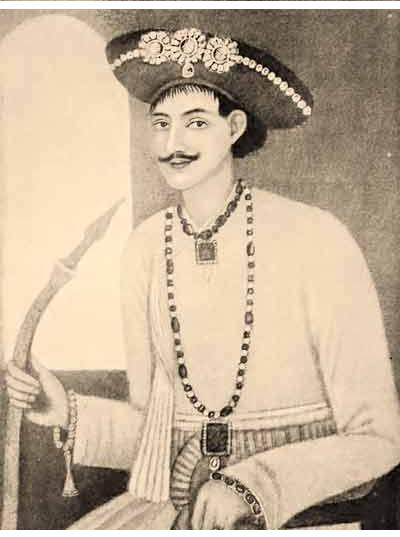
- Nawab Nazim Najabat Ali Khan of Bengal and Bihar, better known as Saif-ud-Daulah.

Nawab Nazim of Bengal and Bihar
- Reign: 22 May 1766 – 10 March 1770
- Coronation: 22 May 1766
- Predecessor: Nazim-ud-din Ali Khan
- Successor: Ashraf Ali Khan
- Born: 3 March 1749; Murshidabad, Bengal, Mughal Empire
- Died: 10 March 1770 (aged 21); Murshidabad, Bengal Presidency
- Burial: Jafarganj, West Bengal, India
Names
- Mir Najabat Ali Khan
- Bengali: নজাবত আলী খান
- Dynasty: Najafi
- Father: Mir Jafar
- Mother: Munni Begum
- Religion: Shia Islam
