= Najmuddin Ali Khan =

Najm ud-din Ali Khan
- Shuja-ul-Mulk (Hero of the Country); Nazam-ud-Daulah (Star of the State); Mahabat Jang (Horror in War)
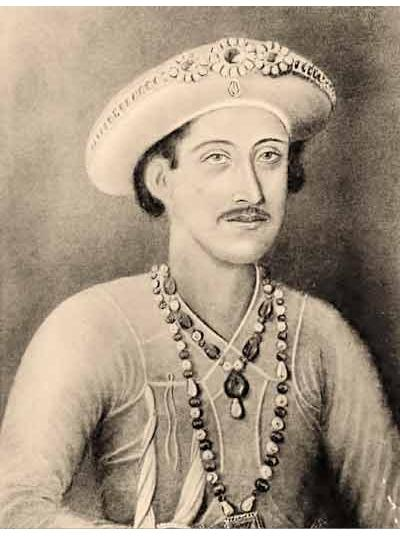

Nawab of Bengal and Bihar
- Reign: 5 February 1765 – 8 May 1766
- Coronation: 23 February 1765
- Predecessor: Mir Jafar
- Successor: Najabat Ali Khan
- Born: c. 1747; Delhi, Delhi Subah, Mughal Empire
- Died: 8 May 1766 (aged 18–19); Murshidabad, Bengal Presidency
- Burial: Jafarganj, West Bengal, India
- Dynasty: Najafi
- Father: Mir Jafar
- Mother: Munni Begum
- Religion: Shia Islam

Najmuddin Ali Khan or Najm ud-din Ali Khan, better known as Najm-ud-Daulah (or Nazam-ud-Daulah) (c. 1747 – 8 May 1766), was the Nawab of Bengal and Bihar from 1765 to 1766. He was the second son of Mir Jafar.

Najm-ud-Daulah was crowned as the Nawab following the death of his father Mir Jafar. During his coronation he was around 18 years old. He ascended to the throne in 1765.

In 1765 after the victory in the Battle of Buxar the British had formally gained Dewani of Bengal and Bihar from Shah Alam II. The Nawab formally conferred this Dewani to the British on 30 September 1765.

Najmuddin died soon afterwards, on 8 May 1766, apparently from a fever caught at a formal party given at Murshidabad fort in honour of Robert Clive. He was buried at Jafraganj Cemetery and was succeeded by his younger brother Nawab Najabat Ali Khan.

== See also ==
- Nawabs of Bengal
- List of rulers of Bengal
- History of Bengal
- History of Bangladesh
- History of India
- Shia Islam in India

Najmuddin Ali Khan Born: 1747 Died: May 8, 1766
Preceded by Mir Jafar	Nawab of Bengal; 5 February 1765 – 8 May 1766	Succeeded by Najabat Ali Khan
