= Mubarak Ali Khan =

- Mutamid ul-Mulk (Guardian of the country); Mubarak ud-Daulah (Auspicious of the state); Firuz Jang (Victor in war)
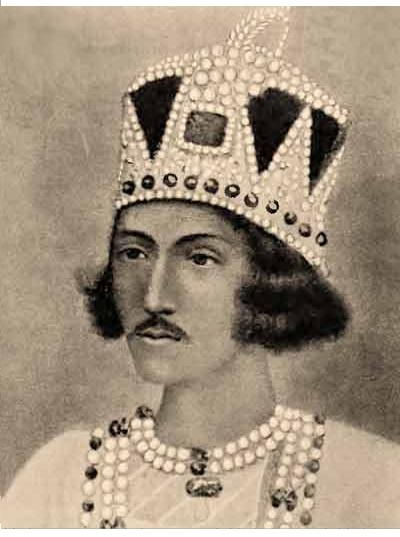

Nawab Nazim of Bengal and Bihar
- Reign: 21 March 1770 – 6 September 1793
- Coronation: 26 March 1770 (12 years old)
- Predecessor: Ashraf Ali Khan
- Successor: Baber Ali Khan
- Born: 11 December 1759; Murshidabad, Bengal, British India
- Died: 6 September 1793 (aged 33); Murshidabad, Bengal, British India
- Issue: 12 sons and 15 daughters
- Dynasty: Najafi
- Father: Mir Jafar
- Mother: Babbu Begum
- Religion: Shia Islam

Sayyid Mubarak Ali Khan (Bengali: মুবারক আলী খান; 1759 – 6 September 1793), better known as Mubarak ud-Daulah (spelled also as: Mubarak ud-Daula), was the Nawab of Bengal and Bihar. He was the son of Mir Jafar and Babbu Begum.

He ascended the throne on 21 March 1770 after his half-brother, Ashraf Ali Khan's death on 10 March 1770. Mubarak Ali Khan was succeeded by his son, Babar Ali Khan after his death on 6 September 1793.

== Life ==
=== Early years ===
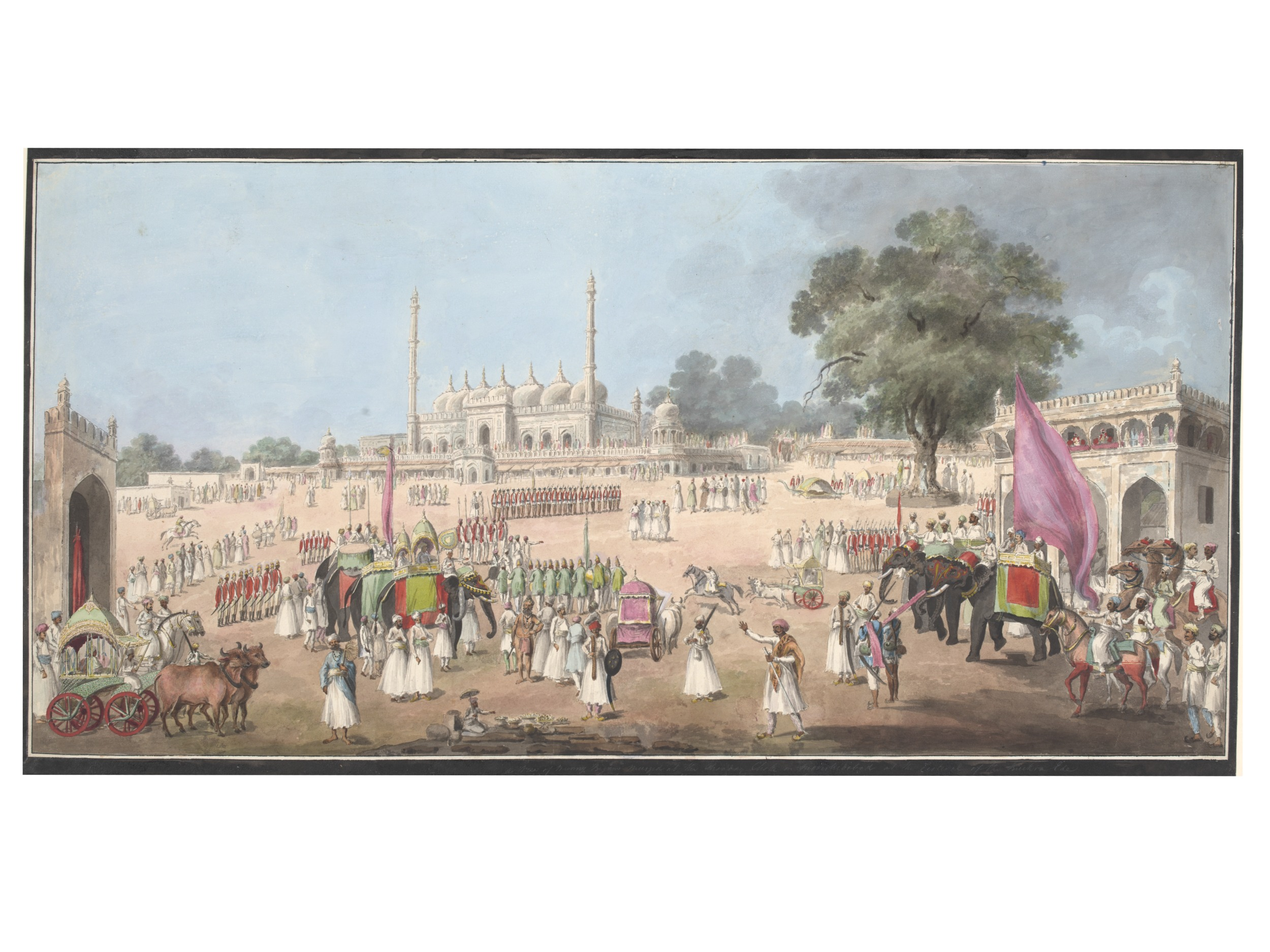
Mubarak ud-Daula Nawab of Murshidabad

Nawab Nazim Mubarak Ali Khan, better known as Mubarak ud-Daulah was the son of Mir Jafar by Babbu Begum. He succeeded his half brother, Ashraf Ali Khan, at the age of 12 years, after Ashraf Ali Khan's death on 24 March 1770. Warren Hastings appointed Mubarak ud-Daulah's stepmother, Munny Begum, his guardian though, his mother Babbu Begum was alive. The reason that why the guardianship was not given Babbu Begum has never been satisfactorily explained.

=== Later years ===
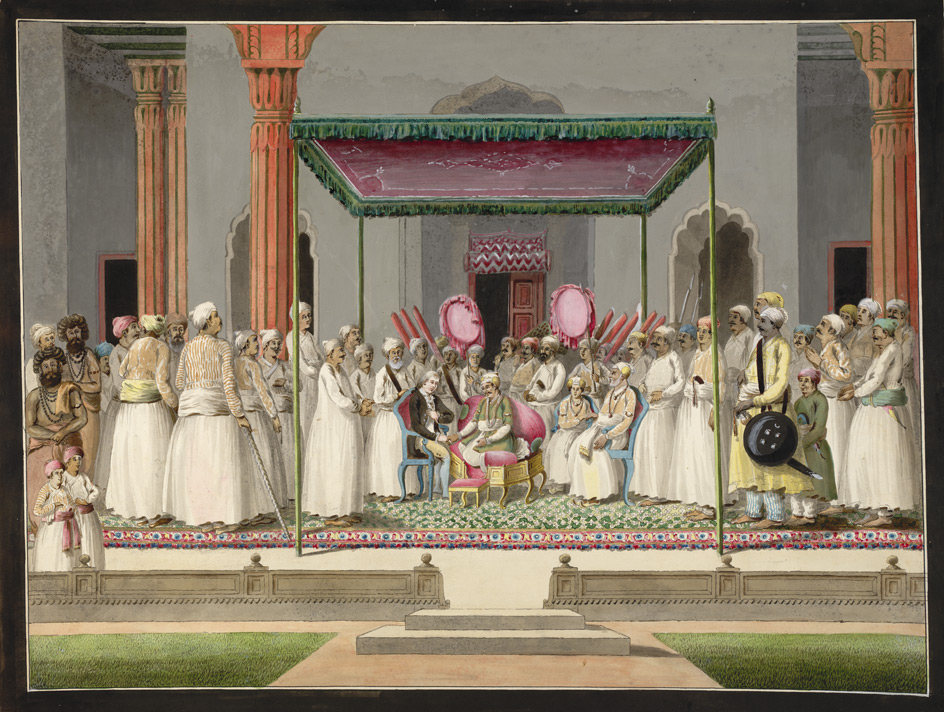
Nawab Nazim Mubarak ud-Daulah (enthroned) with his son, Baber Ali Khan in the Nawab's Durbar with British Resident, Sir John Hadley. Inscribed on the back in ink and pencil is: 'Nabob's Durbar and reception of the English Resident at Morshedabad'.

In 1790, the Queen of the Mughal Emperor Shah Alam II, asked, through Lord Cornwallis, for one of Nawab Mubarak ud-Daulah's daughters in marriage with her son. The Nawab rejected the offer in the following terms, in a letter to Lord Cornwallis:

Please request the Queen to pass over the matter. I cannot, by any means, accede to the proposal. there are many obstacles in the matter. Moreover, there is a longstanding usage in my family, that our daughters can never be given in marriage to any one other than Sayyids. If I act contrary to this, my family custom, I shall be ruined. At all events, my mother and I cannot accept the offer.
—Nawab Nazim Mubarak ud-Daulah of Bengal

Although, the Nawab, then had 13 daughters, and to some extent regarded himself as a servant of the Emperor, he, for family reasons, did not allow the marriage of one of the 13 with even such an honourable prince as the Prince of Delhi.

=== Death and succession ===
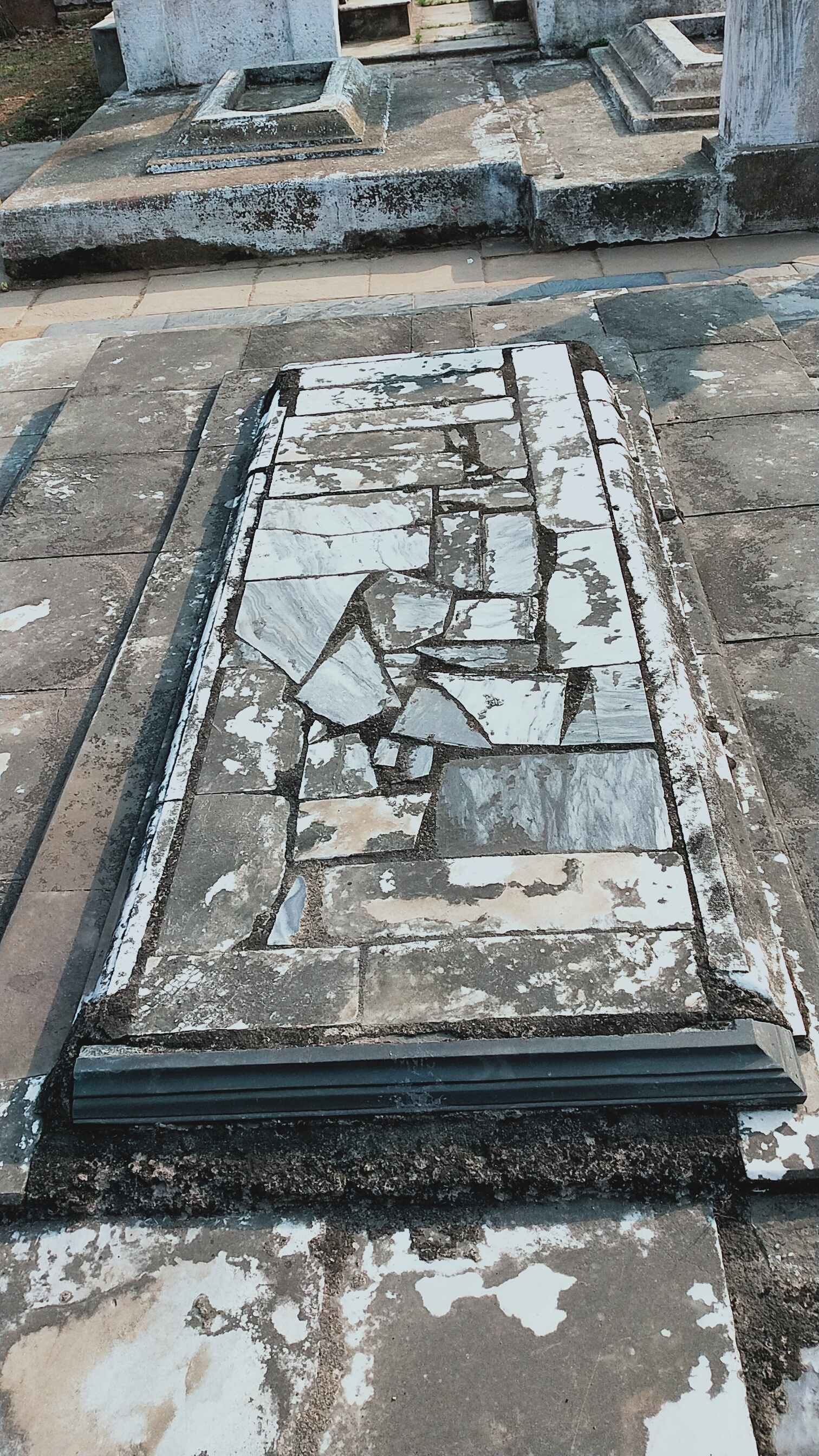
Tomb of Mubarak Ali Khan at Jafarganj Cemetery.

Nawab Nazim Mubarak ud-Daulah died on 6 September 1793. He was succeeded by his son, Baber Ali Khan after his death.

== Marriage ==
=== Principal wives ===
The following are the principal wives of Nawab Nazim Mubarak Ali Khan:

Name	Marriage Place	Marriage Date	Parent/Other	Other names	Birth	Birth Place	Death	Death Place	Burial Place	Notes
(Unknown)	Murshidabad Fort	November 1770	Father: Muhammad Fazl Ali Khan Bahadur; Uncle: Sayyid Muhammad Reza Khan (Naib Nazim of Bengal and Bihar)	N.A.	N.A.	N.A.	N.A.	N.A.	N.A.	N.A.
Faiz-un-nisa Walida Begum	N.A.	N.A.	Father: Fazlullah Khan; Mother: Nadira Begum; Maternal Grandfather: Mirza Hafizullah Khan	N.A.	1756	N.A.	30 December 1820	Murshidabad	Jafarganj Cemetery	She was a Gaddinashin Begum.
Jahan Begum Sahiba	N.A.	N.A.	N.A.	N.A.	N.A.	N.A.	N.A.	N.A.	N.A.	N.A.
Amir-un-nisa Begum Sahiba	N.A.	N.A.	N.A.	N.A.	N.A.	N.A.	N.A.	N.A.	N.A.	N.A.

=== Mut‘ah wives ===
The following are the mut‘ah wives of Nawab Nazim Mubarak Ali Khan:

Name	Other names	Death	Death Place
Sharaf-un-nisa Khanum	N.A.	Before December 1833	Murshidabad
Mubarak-un-nisa Khanum	Nawab Bai	N.A.	N.A.
Lutf-un-nisa Khanum	N.A.	N.A.	N.A.
Bunnu Khanum	N.A.	N.A.	N.A.
Brij Mahal Bakhsh	N.A.	N.A.	N.A.
Adda Kunwar	N.A.	14 April 1838	Murshidabad

== Children ==
The following is the list of the children of Nawab Nazim Mubarak Ali Khan:

Name	Other names	Birth	Birth Place	Death	Death Place	Spouse	Mother	Sex
Sayyid Baber Ali Khan Bahadur	N.A.	N.A.	N.A.	28 April 1810	N.A.	Babbu Begum Sahiba and 1 more.	Faiz-un-nisa Begum	Boy
Sayyid Abdul Qasim Khan Bahadur	Mir Mungli	N.A.	N.A.	30 September 1830	Murshidabad	Izzat-un-nisa, Guhan, Sultan Qajah Sari, and Mul Jan	Sharaf-un-nisa	Boy
Sayyid Husain Ali Khan Bahadur	Mukram ul-Mulk; Iftiqar ud-Daulah; Firuz Jang	N.A.	N.A.	31 August 1810	Murshidabad	N.A.	Nawab Bai	Boy
Mir Mehndi	N.A.	N.A.	N.A.	February 1826	Murshidabad	N.A.	Lutf-un-nisa Khanum	Boy
Sayyid Tamiz Abidin Ali Khan Bahadur	Najam ul-Mulk; Roshan ud-Daulah; Nasir Jang	N.A.	N.A.	9 September 1840	Rajabazar Deori, Murshidabad	(Unknown)	(Unknown)	Boy
Sayyid Mir Muhammad Ali Khan Bahadur	N.A.	N.A.	N.A.	Before 20 June 1827	(Unknown)	(Unknown)	Mubarak-un-nisa Khanum	Boy
Sayyid Zainal-Abidin Ali Khan Bahadur	N.A.	N.A.	N.A.	February 1826	Murshidabad	(Unknown)	Sharaf-un-nisa	Boy
Sayyid Abdul Husain Ali Khan Bahadur	N.A.	N.A.	N.A.	N.A.	N.A.	N.A.	Lutf-un-nisa Khanum	Boy
Sayyid Zulfikar Ali Khan Bahadur	Nawab Jan; Zulfikar ud-Daulah	N.A.	N.A.	12 November 1840	Murshidabad	(Unknown)	Nawab Bai	Boy
Sayyid Nasir-ud-din Haidar Khan Bahadur	N.A.	N.A.	N.A.	23 May 1821	Murshidabad	N.A.	(Unknown)	Boy
Sayyid Ali Reza Khan Bahadur	Maulvi Sahib	N.A.	N.A.	June 1813	Murshidabad	N.A.	(Unknown)	Boy
Sayyid Ahmed Ali Khan Bahadur	Mir Mughal Sahib	N.A.	N.A.	June 1816	Murshidabad	N.A.	(Unknown)	Boy
Zinat-un-nisa Begum Sahiba	N.A.	N.A.	N.A.	N.A.	N.A.	N.A.	Sharaf-un-nisa Khanum	Girl
Hayat-un-nisa Begum Sahiba	Rabia Begum	N.A.	N.A.	N.A.	N.A.	N.A.	(Unknown)	Girl
Mubarak-un-nisa Begum Sahiba	N.A.	N.A.	N.A.	Before 5 May 1827	Murshidabad	N.A.	Faiz-un-nisa Walida Begum	Girl
Badr-un-nisa Begum Sahiba	N.A.	N.A.	N.A.	13 September 1856	Dacca	N.A.	Faiz-un-nisa Walida Begum	Girl
Lutf-un-nisa Begum Sahiba	Sahibzadi Begum	N.A.	N.A.	18 August 1846	Murshidabad	N.A.	Faiz-un-nisa Walida Begum	Girl
Said-un-nisa Begum Sahiba	N.A.	N.A.	N.A.	N.A.	N.A.	N.A.	(Unknown)	Girl
Dudur-un-nisa Begum Sahiba	N.A.	N.A.	N.A.	N.A.	N.A.	N.A.	(Unknown)	Girl
Afzal-un-nisa Begum Sahiba	N.A.	N.A.	N.A.	N.A.	N.A.	N.A.	Lutf-un-nisa Khanum	Girl
Fakhr-un-nisa Begum Sahiba	N.A.	N.A.	N.A.	N.A.	N.A.	N.A.	(Unknown)	Girl
Rahim-un-nisa Begum Sahiba	N.A.	N.A.	N.A.	17 December 1844	Murshidabad	N.A.	Lutf-un-nisa Khanum	Girl
Jigri-Begum Sahiba	N.A.	N.A.	N.A.	13 January 1859	Murshidabad	N.A.	Mubarak-un-nisa Khanum	Girl
Saleh-un-nisa Begum Sahiba	Moti Begum	N.A.	N.A.	N.A.	N.A.	Amin ul-Mulk, Sarfaraz ud-Daulah, Sayyid Daud Ali Khan Bahadur, son of Mumtaz ud-Daulah, Sayyid Abdul Qasim Khan Bahadur, bu his wife, Moti Begum.	Faiz-un-nisa Walida Begum	Girl
Nur-un-nisa Begum Sahiba	N.A.	N.A.	N.A.	25 June 1846	Murshidabad	N.A.	(Unknown)	Girl
Umdat-un-nisa Begum Sahiba	N.A.	N.A.	mursidabad.	10 November 1842	(Rajmahal, Jharkhand)	Sayyid Talib Husain khan Bahadur, son of Mumtaz-ud-Daulah, Sayyid Abdul Qasim Khan Bahadur of Raj Mahal (Royal Palace).	Brij Mahal Bakhsh	Girl
Wahid-un-nisa Begum Sahiba	N.A.	N.A.	N.A.	N.A.	N.A.	N.A.	N.A.	Girl

== See also ==
- Nawabs of Bengal
- List of rulers of Bengal
- History of Bengal
- History of Bangladesh
- History of India
- Shia Islam in India

Mubarak Ali Khan Born: 1759 Died: September 6, 1793
Preceded by Ashraf Ali Khan	Nawab of Bengal; 21 March 1770 – 6 September 1793	Succeeded by Baber Ali Khan
