= Munni Begum (noble) =

- Begum of Nawab of Bengal
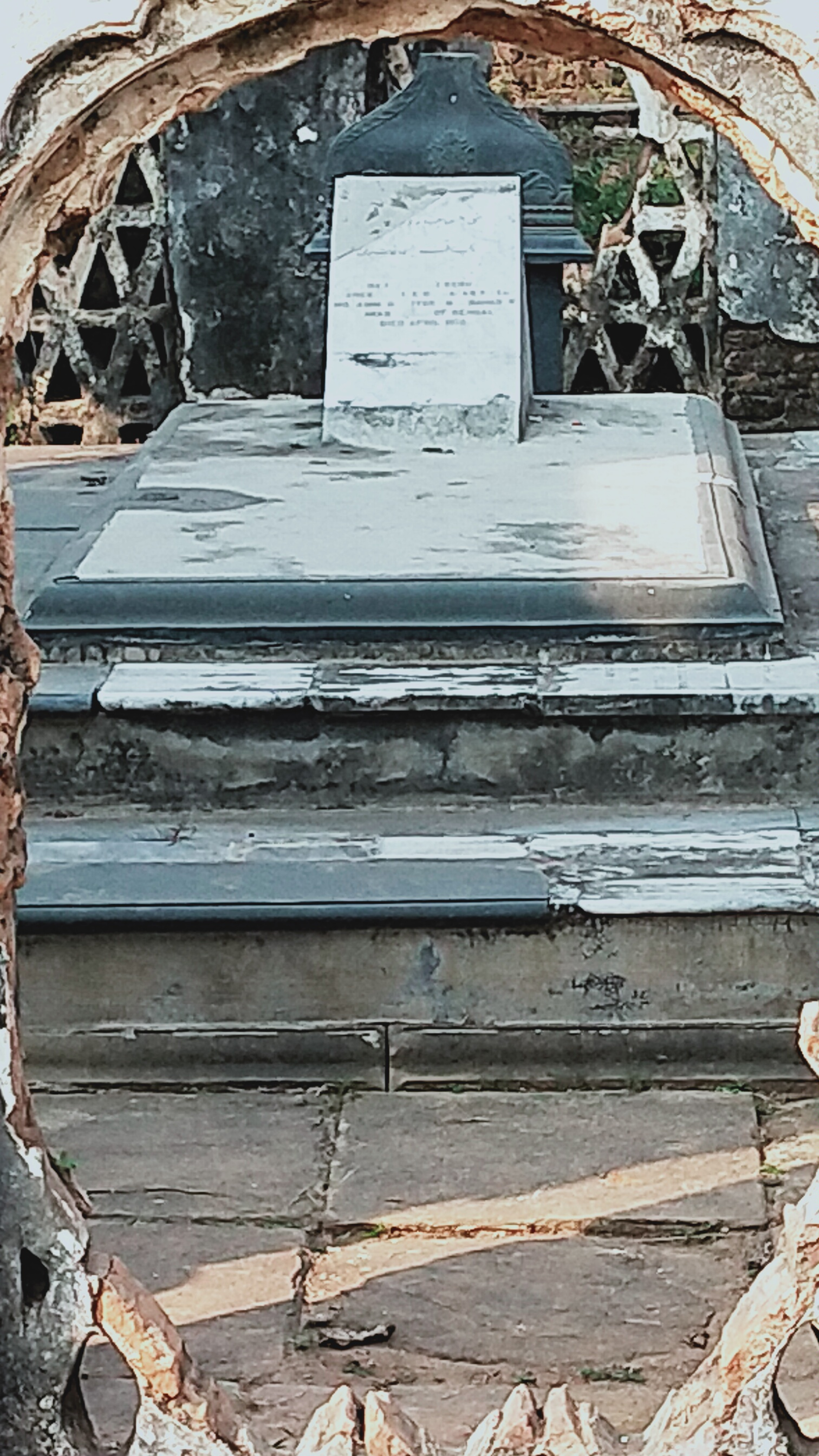
- Tomb of Munni Begum at Jafarganj Cemetery

Empress consort of the Bengal, Bihar and Orissa
- 1st reign: 2 June 1757 – 20 October 1760
- 2nd reign: 25 July 1763 – 17 January 1765
- Born: 1720; Balkunda, Uttar Pradesh
- Died: 10 January 1813 (aged 93); Murshidabad, India
- Burial: Jafarganj Cemetery, Murshidabad
- Spouse: Mir Jafar
- Issue: Najimuddin Ali Khan; Najabat Ali Khan
- Religion: Shia Islam

Munni Begum was the second wife of the Nawab of Bengal, Mir Jafar.

== Early life ==
Munni was born in Balkunda, Sikanda, Uttar Pradesh. Her mother sold her to dancing girl named Bishu when she was young. Bishu taught Munni dancing and made Munni part of her dance troupe. Munni traveled with the troupe to different royal houses of India, dancing in the royal courts. She became famous because of her beauty and skills.

== Career ==
Bishu's troop was invited to dance at the wedding of Ikramuddaula, the adapted son of Ghaseti Begum and Nawazish Muhammad Khan of the Nawab of Bengal family. After the wedding, the troupe remained in Murshidabad where they believed there would be more opportunities for them. Munni was believed to the pretties of the girls. She caught the eye of Mir Jafar, the chief of staff of Nawab Alivardi's Army. Mir Jafar made Munni a part of his harem. She was an intelligent woman and soon became the principal consort of the harem. She would even overshadow the first wife of Mir Jafar, Shah Khanam. The British East India Company led by Robert Clive defeated the Nawab Siraj ud-Daulah with the help of Mir Jafar. The British made Mir Jafar the new Nawab of Bengal. Mir Jafar died on 5 February 1765, leaving Munni a widow and in control of the fortunes of Mir Jafar.

Munni became a good friend of Robert Clive, who promised her his support and in return she gave him half a million rupees. The payment to Clive had secured her sons position on the Masnad. She became the most important female member of the Nawab family. She managed the estate and the salaries of the royal household. Her son, Najimuddin Ali Khan, became the Nawab and her power increased. Najimuddin died in May 1766. Her second son, Najabat Ali Khan succeeded to the throne. He died in 1770 and was succeeded by the son of Babbu Begum, Ashraf Ali Khan. Babbu Begum's influence rose as a result while the influence of Munni decline over the royal household. Munni then helped the British East India Company remove the Naib Nazim, Reza Khan, on accusations of corruption. Munni was made the head of the harem again with Raja Gurudas appointed her deputy. Rani Bhabani gifted Munni a Palanquin with 30 people to carry it. She also gifted a plot of land to pay the cost of 30 servants. She was removed from the guardianship of the young Nawab by the court of directors of the East India company after political opponents of her ally Warren Hastings, the governor of India, raised allegation of corruption against them.

== Death ==
Munni died on 10 January 1812 at the age of 93. The Union Jack was hoisted at half-mast and 90 guns were fired in Fort William, India. She was buried beside her husband, Mir Jafar, in his family graveyard.
