= Ahmad Ali Khan of Murshidabad =

Ahmad Ali Khan
- Baeran ul-Mulk (Administrator of the country); Ihtisham ud-Daulah (Dignifier of the country); Walla Jah (Of High Rank); Nahabat Jang (Horror in War)
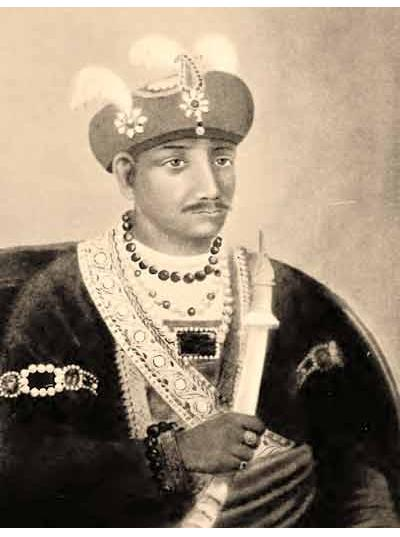

Nawab Nazim of Bengal and Bihar
- Reign: 6 August 1821 – 30 October 1824
- Predecessor: Zain-ud-Din Ali Khan
- Successor: Mubarak Ali Khan II
- Born: 12 January 1793; Murshidabad, Bengal, British India
- Died: 24 October 1824 (aged 31); Murshidabad, Bengal, British India
- Burial: Jafarganj Cemetery
- Issue: Mubarak Ali Khan II
- Dynasty: Najafi
- Religion: Shia Islam

Sayyid Ahmad Ali Khan (Bengali: সৈয়দ আহমদ আলী খান) (died 30 October 1824), popularly known as Walla Jah or Ahmad Ali Khan of Murshidabad, was the Nawab of Bengal and Bihar. He succeeded his half-brother, Zain-ud-Din Ali Khan, after he died on 6 August 1821, without a male issue. Walla Jah was the Nawab of Bengal from 1821 to 1824.

== Life ==
=== Career ===
Ahmad Ali Khan, better known as Walla Jah, succeeded Zain-ud-Din Ali Khan after his death in 1821 as the Nawab Nazim of Bengal and Bihar under the titles of Baeran ul-Mulk (Administrator of the country), Ihtisham ud-Daulah (Dignifier of the country), Walla Jah (Of High Rank) and Nahabat Jang (Horror in War).

== See also ==
- List of rulers of Bengal
- History of Bengal
- History of India

Ahmad Ali Khan of Murshidabad Born: (Unknown) Died: 30 October 1824
Preceded by Zain-ud-Din Ali Khan	Nawab of Bengal; 6 August 1821 – 30 October 1824	Succeeded by Mubarak Ali Khan II
