= Mir Jafar =

Nawab of Bengal (r. 1757–1760, 1763–1765)

Mir Syed Jafar Ali Khan Bahadur
- Portrait of Mir Jafar, c. 1760–1775

Nawab Nazim of Bengal and Bihar
- 1st reign: 2 July 1757 – 20 October 1760
- Predecessor: Siraj ud-Daulah
- Successor: Mir Qasim
- 2nd reign: 25 July 1763 – 5 February 1765
- Predecessor: Mir Qasim
- Successor: Najimuddin Ali Khan
- Born: 1691; Delhi, Delhi Subah, Mughal Empire
- Died: 5 February 1765 (aged 73–74); Namak Haram Deorhi, Murshidabad, Bengal
- Burial: Jafarganj Cemetery, West Bengal, India
- Spouse: Shah Khanum (m. 1727, d. August 1779); Munni Begum (m. 1746, d. 10 January 1813); Rahat-un-nisa Begum (Mut'ah wife); Babbu Begum (d. 1809)
- Issue: Sadiq Ali Khan Bahadur (Mir Miran); Najimuddin Ali Khan; Najabut Ali Khan (Mir Phulwari); Ashraf Ali Khan; Mubaraq Ali Khan; Hadi Ali Khan Bahadur; Fatima Begum; Misri Begum; Roshan-un-nisa Begum (Nishani Begum); Husaini Begum; 2 more daughters
Names
- Syed Mir Muhammad Jafar Ali Khan Bahadaur
- House: Najafi
- Father: Syed Ahmed Najafi (Mirza Mirak)
- Religion: Shia Islam
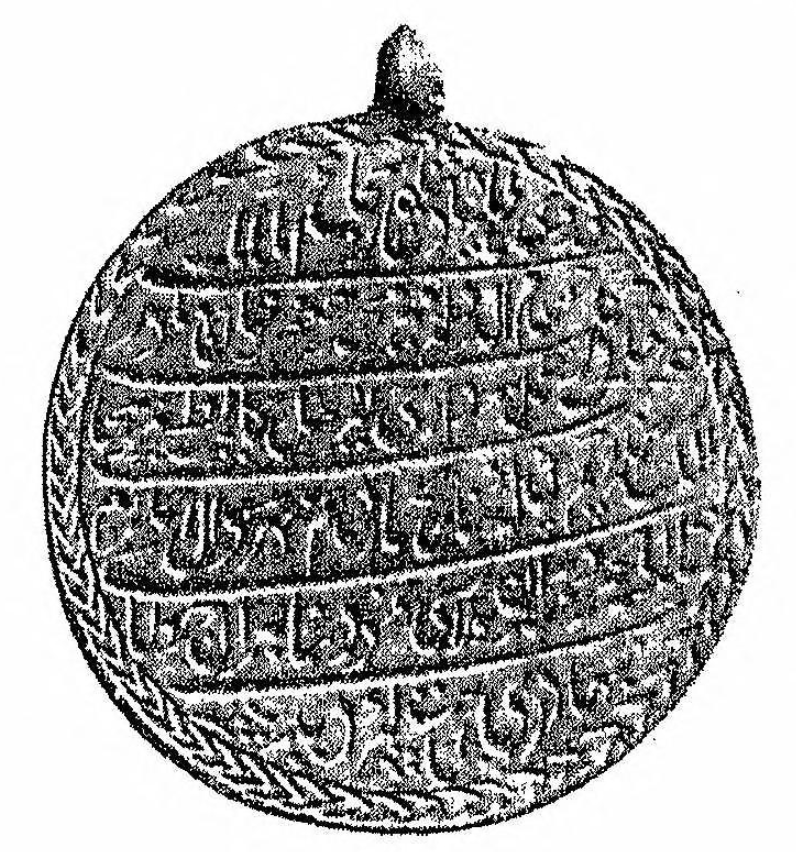
- Signature

Mir Jafar (Note: Persian: میر جعفر; Bengali: মীর জাফর) (Full Name: Syed Mir Muhammad Jafar Ali Khan Bahadaur) (c. 1691 – 5 February 1765) was a commander-in-chief or general, who became the first dependent Nawab of Bengal within the support of the East India Company. His reign has been considered by many historians as the start of the expansion of British control of the Indian subcontinent in Indian history. He is notoriously known for his betrayal of Nawab Siraj-ud-Daulah in the Battle of Plassey.

Mir Jafar served as the commander of the Bengali army under Siraj ud-Daulah, but betrayed him during the Battle of Plassey and ascended to the masnad after the British victory in 1757. Mir Jafar received military support from the East India Company until 1760. Jafar's dispute with the British eventually led to the Battle of Chinsurah. The British proposed that Mir Qasim, Jafar's son-in-law, should rule. The company forced him to abdicate in favor of Qasim. However, the East India Company eventually overthrew Qasim as well due to disputes over trade policies. Jafar was restored as the Nawab with the support of the company. Mir Qasim, however, refused to accept this and went to war against the company. Jafar ruled until his death on 5 February 1765 and lies buried at the Jafarganj Cemetery in Murshidabad.

Due to his role in helping the British colonize India, and the eventual downfall of the Mughal Empire, Mir Jafar is reviled in the Indian subcontinent as a traitor, especially among the Bengalis in both India and Bangladesh.

== Early life and family ==
Mir Jafar was born in Delhi in 1691. His grandfather was Syed Husayn Tabatabaei, who migrated from Najaf in Iraq (then part of the Safavid Empire) and settled in Delhi on 24 April 1675 after being invited by the Mughal emperor Aurangzeb. Tabatabaei married the emperor's niece and served as a Qadi in the Mughal court. Jafar's paternal aunt, Begum Sharfunnisa, was the wife of Nawab Alivardi Khan of Bengal.

== Subedar of the Nawab of Bengal ==
In 1747 the Maratha Empire led by Raghoji I Bhonsle, began to raid, pillage and annex the territories of Alivardi Khan, the Nawab of Bengal. During the Maratha invasion of Odisha, its subedar Mir Jafar completely withdrew all forces until the arrival of Alivardi Khan and the Mughal Army at the Battle of Burdwan where Raghoji I Bhonsle and his Maratha forces were completely routed. The enraged Alivardi Khan then dismissed the shamed Mir Jafar.

== Nawab of Bengal ==
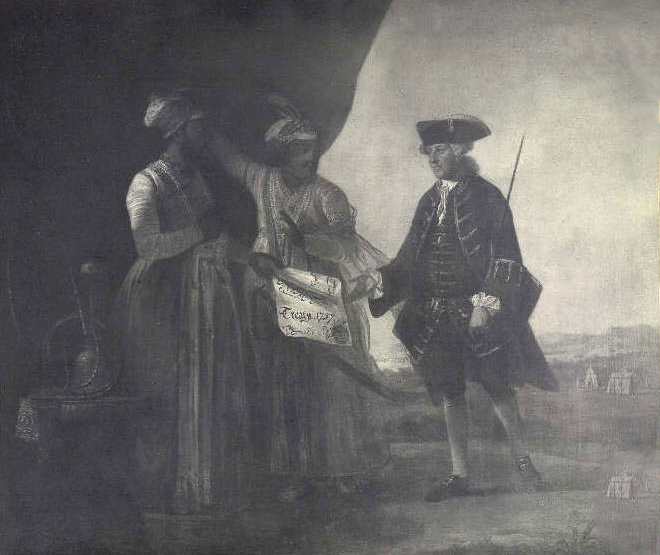
Jafar and his son Miran delivering the Treaty of 1757 to William Watts

Mir Jafar was the principal general of Alivardi Khan's successor, Siraj ud-Daulah, who led the Nawab's army to victory against the British on 19 June 1756. Governor Drake abandoned Fort William and fled with a small number of friends and principal persons, abandoning his compatriots to their fates. In spite of having led a successful attack against the Company, Jafar found himself sidelined by Siraj in favour of his rival, Raja Manikchand. A discontented Mir Jafar found support in others who opposed Siraj's tyrannical rule, from his brothers-in-arms from the Maratha Wars, to the powerful Jagat Seths. With nowhere else to turn, the plotters reached out to the Company, who had regained and strengthened their position in the region under Clive and Watson, hoping to use their military forces to their own ends. William Watts was the first to become aware of the mutterings of the disaffected nobles in Murshidabad, and sent his Armenian agent, Khwaja Petrus Aratoon, to investigate. The answer came back that Mir Jafar, in his position as the paymaster of the Bengal army, was prepared to siphon off significant amounts of money (2.5 crore rupees then, £325 million today) for help in the removal of the Nawab. Watts wrote to Clive, who had himself observed that "he [Siraj] is a compound of everything that is bad, keeps company with none but his menial servants, and is universally hated and despised." The military under Mir Jafar, Jagat Seths as the financiers, and Clive with the mercenary army (ignoring strict instructions from London) were ready to stage a coup against the Nawab.

Mir Jafar betrayed Siraj ud-Daulah to the British in the Battle of Plassey. After Siraj Ud Daulah's defeat and subsequent execution, Jafar achieved his long-pursued dream of gaining the throne, and was propped up by the East India company as a puppet Nawab. Jafar paid Rs. 17,700,000 as compensation for the attack on Calcutta to the company and traders of the city. In addition, he gave bribes to the officials of the company. Robert Clive, for example, received over two million rupees, and William Watts received over one million.

Soon, however, he realized that company's expectations were boundless and tried to wriggle out from under them; this time with the help of the Dutch. However, the British defeated the Dutch at the Battle of Chinsurah in November 1759 and retaliated by forcing him to abdicate in favor of his son-in-law Mir Qasim. Qasim proved to be both able and independent-minded, although he soon came into dispute with the company over their refusal to pay taxes to Qasim. Mir Qasim formed an alliance to force the East India Company out of East India. The company soon went to war with him and his allies. The Battle of Buxar was fought on 22 October 1764 between the forces under the command of the East India Company led by Hector Munro, and the combined armies of Mir Qasim the Nawab of Bengal, Shuja-ud-Daula the Nawab of Awadh, and the Mughal Emperor Shah Alam II. With the defeat in Buxar, Mir Qasim was eventually overthrown. Mir Jafar managed to regain the good graces of the British; he was again installed Nawab in 1764 and held the position until his death in 1765.

=== Bengal War ===
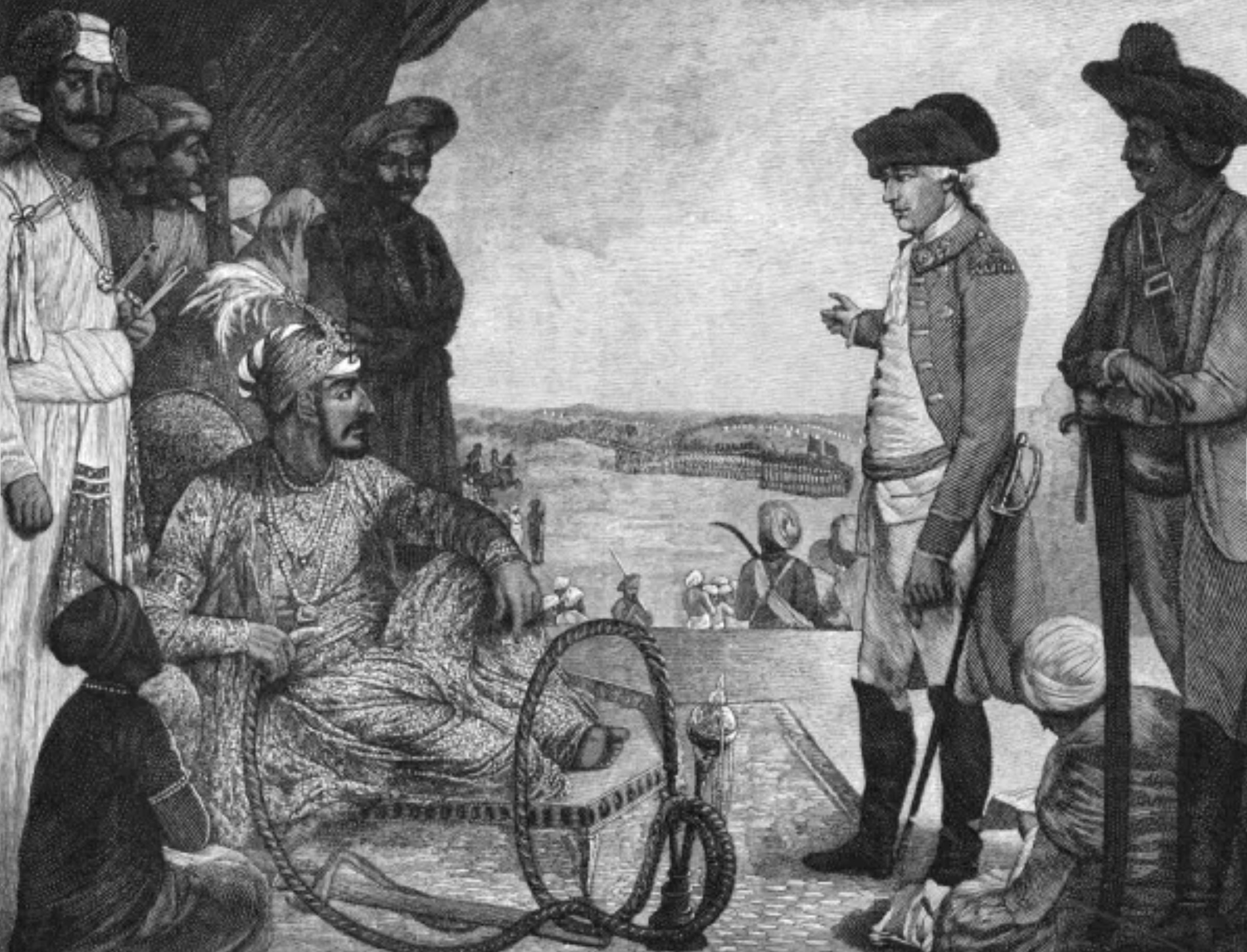
1894 illustration of Shah Alam II reviewing the British East India Company's troops in 1781

"Some ill-designing people had turned his brain, and carried him to the eastern part of the Mughal Empire, which would be the cause of much trouble and ruin to our regimes."

— Imad-ul-Mulk's letter to Mir Jafar, after the escape of the Mughal crown prince Ali Gauhar.

In 1760, after gaining control over Bihar, Odisha and some parts of the Bengal, the Mughal Crown Prince Ali Gauhar and his Mughal Army of 30,000 intended to overthrow Jafar, Imad-ul-Mulk after they tried to capture or kill him by advancing towards Awadh and Patna in 1759. But the conflict soon involved the increasingly assertive East India Company. The Mughals were led by Prince Ali Gauhar, who was accompanied by Muhammad Quli Khan, Hidayat Ali, Mir Afzal and Ghulam Husain Tabatabai. Their forces were reinforced by the forces of Shuja-ud-Daula and Najib-ud-Daula. The Mughals were also joined by Jean Law and two hundred Frenchmen and waged a campaign against the British during the Seven Years' War.

Although the French were eventually defeated, the conflict between the British East India Company and the Mughal Empire would continue to linger and ended in a draw, which eventually culminated during the Battle of Buxar.

== Death ==
Mir Jafar died on 5 February 1765 in Murshidabad after suffering from leprosy and prolonged ill health, and an addiction to opium during the final years of his life.

== Legacy ==
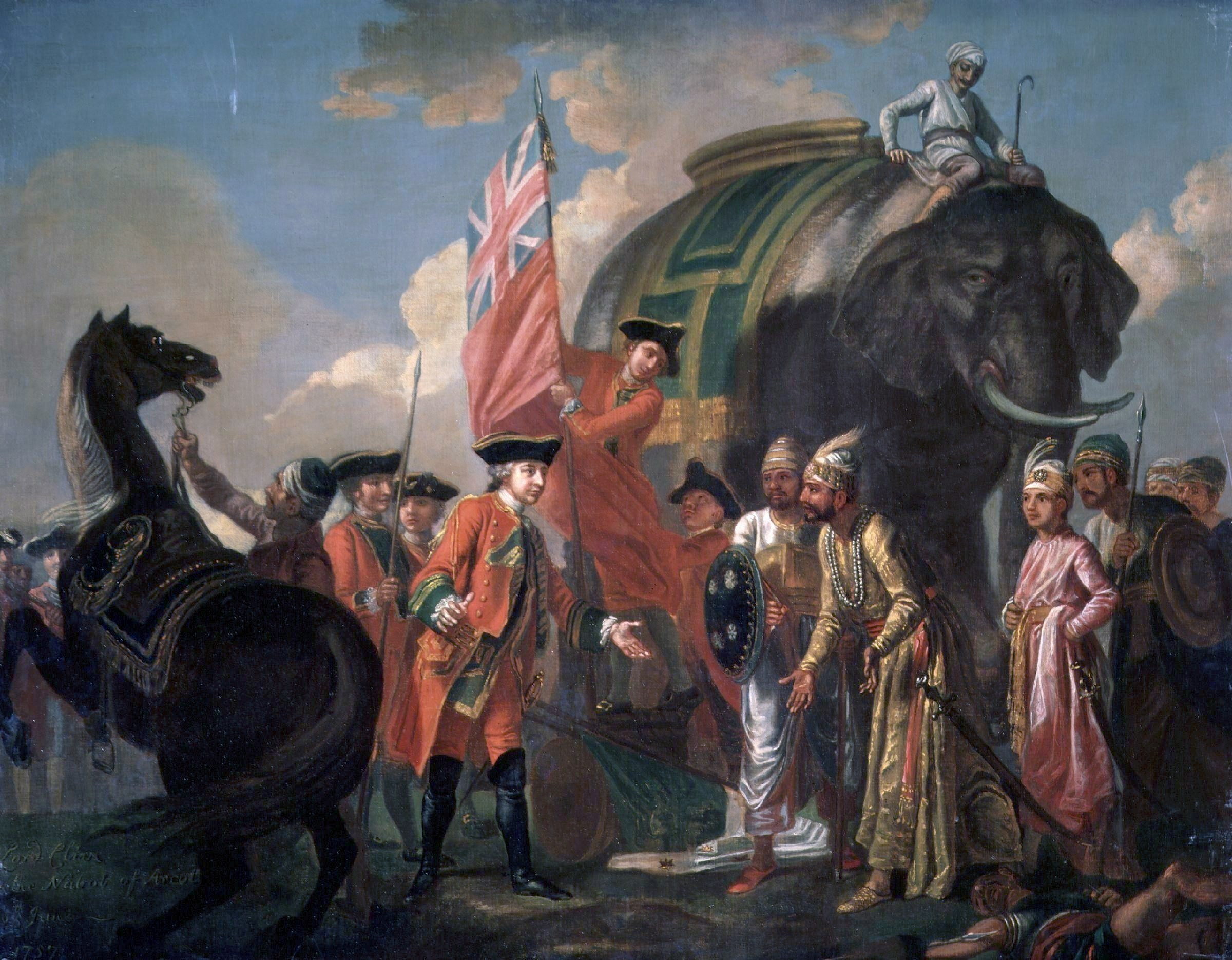
Robert Clive, 1st Baron Clive, meeting with Jafar after Plassey, by Francis Hayman.

The breakup of the centralized Mughal empire by 1750, led to creation of a large number of independent kingdoms in what is now Northern, Central and Western India, as well as Pakistan and parts of Afghanistan (all provinces of the former Mughal empire). Each of them were in conflict with their neighbor. These kingdoms bought weapons from the British and French East India companies to aid their wars. Bengal was one such kingdom. The British and French supported whichever princes ensured their trading interest. Jafar came to power with support of British East India Company. After the defeat of Siraj-ud-Daulah and later Mir Qasim the British strengthened their position in Bengal and in 1793 abolished the nizamat (referring to the Mughal suzerainty) and took complete control of the former Mughal province.

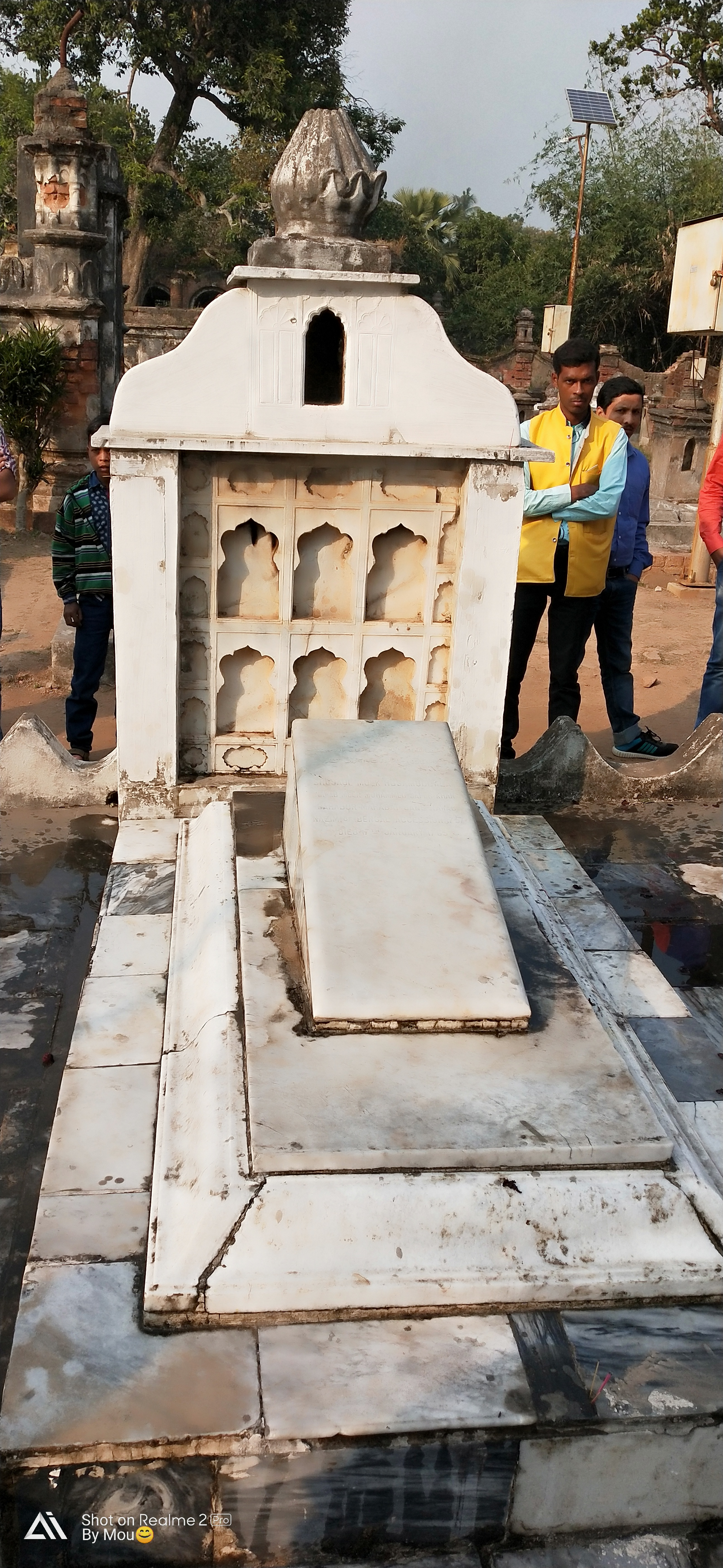
Tomb of Mir Jafar, Jafarganj Cemetery, Murshidabad

Muhammad Iqbal, the notable poet of Indian subcontinent, condemned Mir Jafar and Mir Sadiq as follows:

جافر از بنگال، و صادق از دکن
ننگِ آدم، ننگِ دین، ننگِ وطن

Translation:

Jafar of Bengal and Sadiq of the Deccan:
A stigma on humanity, on religion, and the country.

== See also ==
- Namak Haram Deorhi
- Great Britain in the Seven Years War
- Iskander Mirza

== Notes ==
- "Riyazu-s-salatin", Ghulam Husain Salim – a reference to the appointment of Mohanlal can be found here
- "Seir Muaqherin", Ghulam Husain Tabatabai – a reference to the conspiracy can be found here
