= Ashraf Ali Khan =

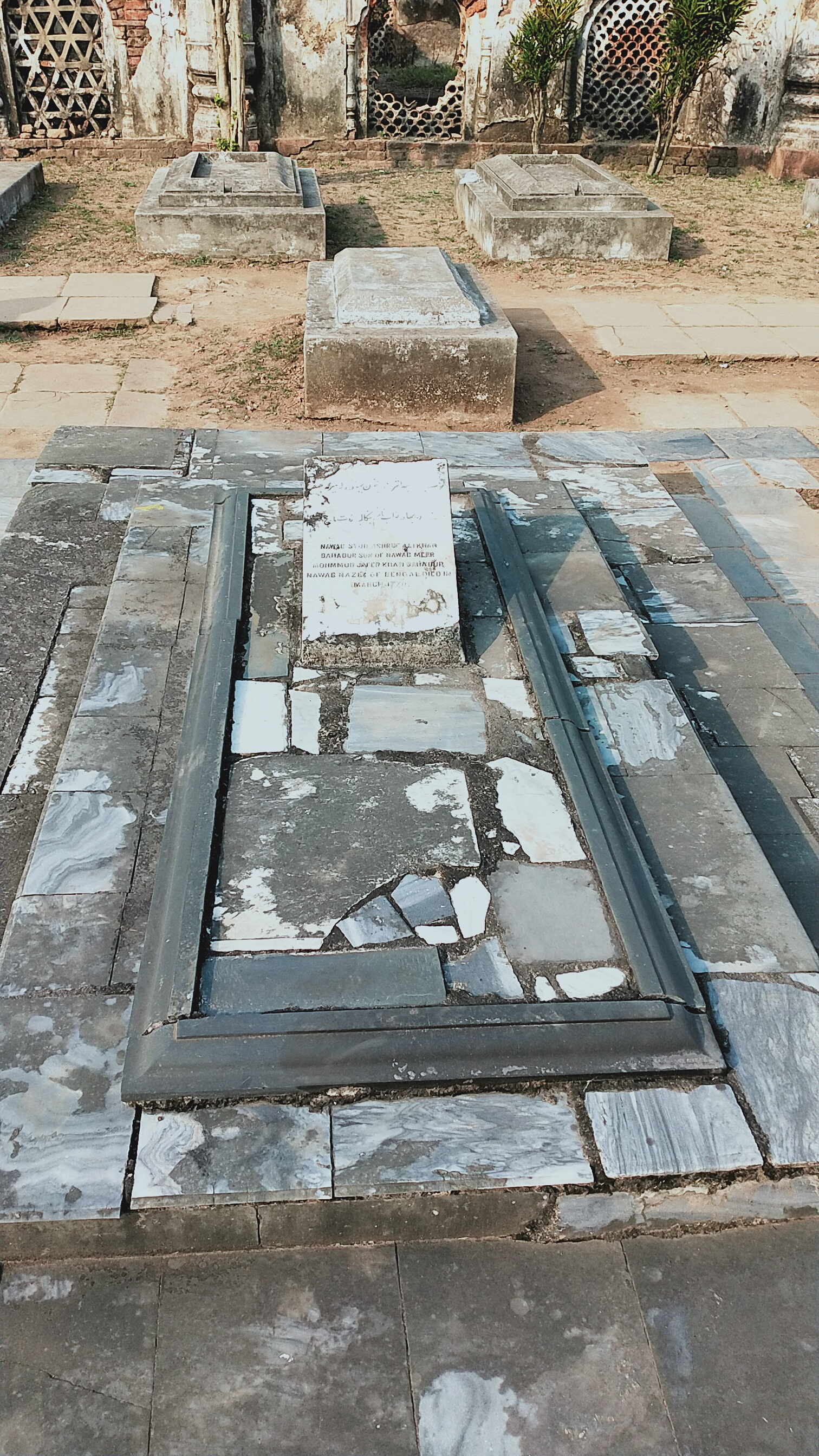
- Tomb of Ashraf Ali Khan at Jafarganj Cemetery.

Nawab Nazim of Bengal and Bihar
- Reign: 10 March 1770 – 24 March 1770
- Coronation: 21 March 1770
- Predecessor: Najabat Ali Khan
- Successor: Mubarak Ali Khan
- Born: c. 1759; Murshidabad, Bengal Subah
- Died: 24 March 1770 (aged 10–11); Namak Haram Deorhi, Bengal Presidency
- Burial: Jafarganj Cemetery
- Consort: Sakina Begum
- Issue: Sharif ud-din 'Ali Khan (one son and three daughters)
Names
- Sayyid Ashraf 'Ali Khan
- Dynasty: Najafi
- Father: Mir Jafar
- Mother: Rahat un-Nisa Begum
- Religion: Shia Islam

Sayyid Ashraf 'Ali Khan Bahadur (Bengali: আশরাফ আলী খান; before 1759 – 24 March 1770), was Nawab Nazim of Bengal and Bihar. He was the fourth son of Mir Jafar.

== Life ==
He was adopted by his aunt, Nafisat un-Nisa Begum Sahiba (Manjhli Begum). On 11 March 1770, he was proclaimed as Nawab Nazim of Bengal and Bihar on the death of his elder brother Najabat Ali Khan. He was formally installed on the Khahar Balish, at Murshidabad Fort, 21 March 1770.

But shortly he died of smallpox, at Murshidabad Fort, 24 March 1770.

== See also ==
- History of Bangladesh
- History of Bengal
- History of India
- List of rulers of Bengal
- Nawabs of Bengal
- Shia Islam in the Indian subcontinent

Ashraf Ali Khan Born: before 1759 Died: March 24, 1770
Preceded by Najabat Ali Khan	Nawab of Bengal; 10 March 1770 – 24 March 1777	Succeeded by Mubarak Ali Khan
