= Nawabs of Bengal =

Governors of Eastern India and Bengal in the 18th-century

Nawab of Bengal
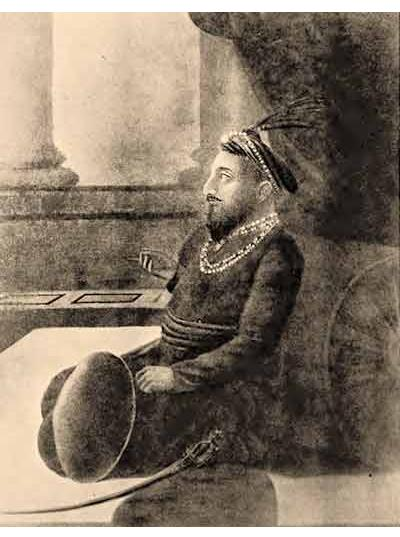
- First to reign Murshid Quli Khan; 1717 – 30 June 1727

Details
- Style: His Majesty
- First monarch: Murshid Quli Khan
- Last monarch: Siraj ud-Daulah (Independent); Mansur Ali Khan (Under British)
- Formed: 1717; 309 years ago
- Abolished: 1882; 144 years ago
- Residences: Chehel Shetun Palace, Hirajheel Palace, Hazarduari Palace
- Appointer: Hereditary (1717–1757); British Empire (1757–1882)

The nawabs of Bengal were the hereditary rulers of Bengal Subah in Mughal India. In the early 18th century, the Nawab of Bengal was the de facto independent ruler of the three provinces of Bengal, Bihar and Orissa and they are often referred to as the nawabs of Bengal, Bihar and Orissa. The nawabs were based in Murshidabad which was centrally located within Bengal, Bihar, and Orissa. Their chief, a former prime minister, became the first nawab. The nawabs continued to issue coins in the name of the Mughal emperor, but for all practical purposes, the nawabs governed as independent monarchs. Bengal continued to contribute the largest share of funds to the imperial Mughal treasury in Delhi.

The Bengal Subah reached its peak during the reign of Nawab Shuja-ud-Din Muhammad Khan.

The nawabs, especially under the rule of Alivardi Khan of 16 years, were heavily engaged in various wars against the Marathas. Towards the end, he turned his attention to rebuilding and restoring Bengal.

The nawabs of Bengal oversaw a period of proto-industrialization. The Bengal-Bihar-Orissa triangle was a major production center for cotton muslin cloth, silk cloth, shipbuilding, gunpowder, saltpetre, and metalworks. Factories were set up in Murshidabad, Dhaka, Patna, Sonargaon, Chittagong, Rajshahi, Cossimbazar, Balasore, Pipeli, and Hugli among other cities, towns, and ports. The region became a base for the British East India Company, the French East India Company, the Danish East India Company, the Austrian East India Company, the Ostend Company, and the Dutch East India Company. The nawabs, backed by bankers such as the Jagat Seth, became the financial backbone of the Mughal court.

The British company eventually rivaled the authority of the nawabs. In the aftermath of the siege of Calcutta in 1756, in which the Nawab's forces overran the main British base, the East India Company dispatched a fleet led by Robert Clive who defeated the last independent Nawab Siraj-ud-Daulah at the Battle of Plassey in 1757. Mir Jafar was installed as the puppet nawab. His successor Mir Qasim attempted in vain to dislodge the British. The defeat of Nawab Mir Qasim of Bengal, Nawab Shuja-ud-Daula of Oudh, and Mughal emperor Shah Alam II at the Battle of Buxar in 1764 paved the way for British expansion across India. The South Indian Kingdom of Mysore led by Tipu Sultan overtook the Nawab of Bengal as the subcontinent's wealthiest monarchy; but this was short-lived and ended with the Anglo-Mysore War. The British then turned their sights on defeating the Marathas and Sikhs.

In 1772, Governor-General Warren Hastings shifted administrative and judicial offices from Murshidabad to Calcutta, the capital of the newly formed Bengal Presidency, and the de facto capital of British India. The nawabs had lost all independent authority since 1757. In 1858, the British government abolished the symbolic authority of the Mughal court. After 1880, the descendants of the nawabs of Bengal were recognised simply as nawabs of Murshidabad with the mere status of a peerage.

== History ==
=== Independent nawabs ===
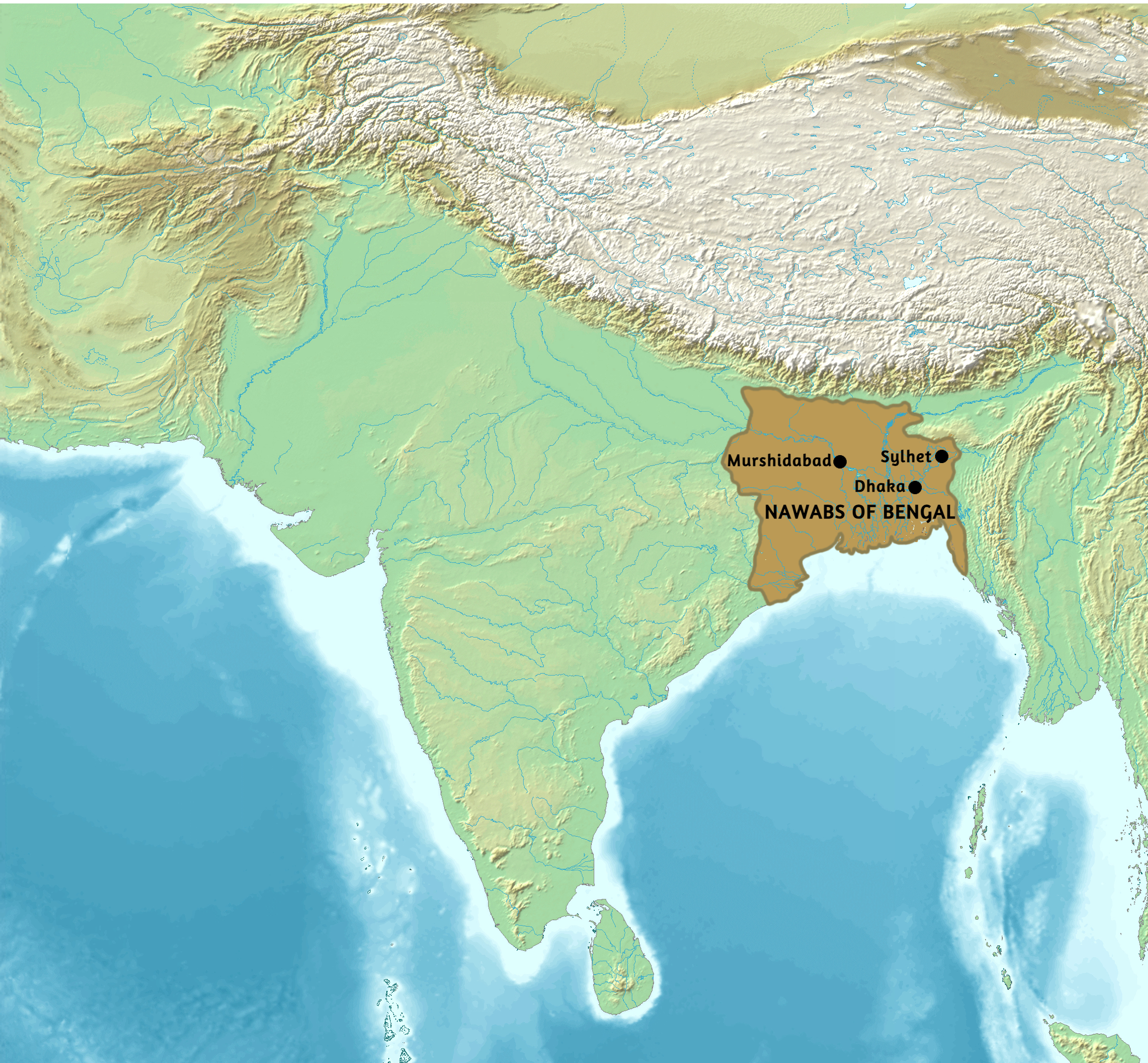
The nawabs of Bengal in 1733, almost a decade before the Maratha invasions of Bengal

The Bengal Subah was the wealthiest subah of the Mughal Empire. There were several posts under the Mughal administrative system of Bengal since Akbar's conquest in the 1500s. Nizamat (governornership) and diwani (premiership) were the two main branches of provincial government under the Mughals. The Subahdar was in-charge of the nizamat and had a chain of subordinate officials on the executive side, including diwans (prime ministers) responsible for revenue and legal affairs. The regional decentralization of the Mughal Empire led to the creation of numerous semi-independent strongholds in the Mughal provinces. As the Mughal Empire began to decline, the nawabs rose in power. By the early 1700s, the nawabs were practically independent, despite a nominal tribute to the Mughal court.

The Mughal court heavily relied on Bengal for revenue. Azim-us-Shan, the Mughal viceroy of Bengal, had a bitter power struggle with his prime minister (diwan) Murshid Quli Khan. Emperor Aurangzeb transferred Azim-us-Shan out of Bengal and into Bihar in 1703 as a result of the disputes. After the viceroy's exit, the provincial premier Murshid Quli Khan emerged as the de facto ruler of Bengal. His administrative coup merged the offices of the diwan (prime minister) and subedar (viceroy). In 1716, Khan shifted Bengal's capital from Dhaka to a new city named after himself. In 1717, Mughal emperor Farrukhsiyar recognized Khan as the hereditary Nawab Nazim. The Nawab's jurisdiction covered districts in Bengal, Bihar, and Orissa. The Nawab's territory stretched from the border with Oudh in the west to the border with Arakan in the east.

The chief deputy of the Nawab was the Naib Nazim of Dhaka, the mayor of the former provincial capital whose own wealth was considerable; the Naib Nazim of Dhaka also governed much of eastern Bengal. Other important officials were stationed in Patna, Cuttack, and Chittagong. The aristocracy was composed of the Zamindars of Bengal. The Nawab was backed up by the powerful Jagat Seth family of bankers and money lenders. The Jagat Seth controlled the flow of Bengali revenue into the imperial treasury in Delhi. They served as financiers to both the nawabs and European companies operating in the region.

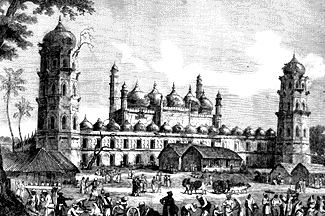
Sketch of the main caravanserai and mosque in Murshidabad

The nawabs profited from the revenue generated by the worldwide demand of muslin trade in Bengal, which was centred in Dhaka and Sonargaon. Murshidabad was a major centre of silk production. Shipbuilding in Chittagong enjoyed Ottoman and European demand. Patna was a centre of metalworks and the military-industrial complex. The Bengal-Bihar region was a major exporter of gunpowder and saltpetre. The nawabs presided over an era of growing organization in banking, handicrafts, and other trades.

Bengal attracted traders from across Eurasia. Traders were lodged at caravanserais, including the Katra Masjid in Murshidabad; and the Bara Katra and Choto Katra in Dhaka. Dutch Bengali trading posts included the main Dutch port of Pipeli in Orissa; the Dutch settlement in Rajshahi; and the towns of Cossimbazar and Hugli. The Danes built trading posts in Bankipur and on islands of the Bay of Bengal. Balasore in Orissa was a prominent Austrian trading post. Bengali cities were full of brokers, workers, peons, naibs, wakils, and ordinary traders.

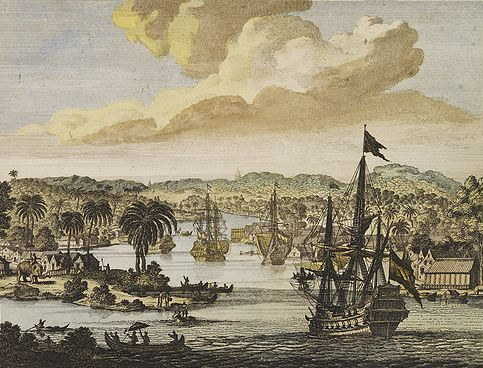
Dutch East India Company ships in Chittagong harbor, early 18th-century

The nawabs were patrons of the arts, including the Murshidabad style of Mughal painting, Hindustani classical music, the Baul tradition, and local craftsmanship. The second Nawab Shuja-ud-Din Muhammad Khan developed Murshidabad's royal palace, military base, city gates, revenue office, public audience hall (durbar), and mosques in an extensive compound called Farrabagh (Garden of Joy) which included canals, fountains, flowers, and fruit trees. The second Nawab's reign saw a period of economic and political consolidation.

The third Nawab Sarfaraz Khan was preoccupied with military engagements, including Nader Shah's invasion of India. Sarfaraz Khan was killed at the Battle of Giria by his deputy Alivardi Khan. The coup by Alivardi Khan led to the creation of a new dynasty. Nawab Murshid Quli Khan was notorious for his repressive tax collection tactics, including torture for non-payment. However he was also known as Shuja ul-Mulk (hero of the country) mostly due to him repelling all Maratha invasions of Bengal.

=== Afghan Insurrections ===
The Afghan insurrections in Bengal, also known as the Afghan mutinies were a series of four revolts led by the Afghans living in the Bengal Subah between 1745-1750. They were led by ambitious individuals like Mustafa Khan, Sardar Khan and Shamshir Khan with the intent to carve out their own Afghan state in Bengal. The insurrections were ultimately suppressed.

=== Maratha invasions of Bengal ===
The resurgent Maratha Empire launched raids against Bengal in the 18th century, which further added to the decline of the nawabs of Bengal. The Bengal Subah was met by a series of face to face confrontations by the Maratha Empire including the First Battle of Katwa, the Second Battle of Katwa, the Battle of Burdwan and the Battle of Rani Sarai, Battle of Birbhum, First and Second Battles of Midnapur where Nawab Alivardi Khan defeated the Marathas and repelled their attacks. The Maratha raids lasted a decade from 1741 to early 1751.

The Marathas committed many atrocities across Bengal causing many to flee from West Bengal to East Bengal. 400,000 civilian Bengalis were massacred by the Bargis (Maratha warriors) including textile weavers, silk winders, and mulberry cultivators. Many Bengalis were mutilated and contemporary accounts describe the scene of mass gang-rape against women. Alivardi Khan the Nawab of Bengal fearing even worse devastation and destruction agreed to pay Rs. 1.2 million of tribute annually as the chauth of Bengal and Bihar to the Marathas, and the Marathas agreed not to invade Bengal again.

The expeditions, led by Raghuji Bhonsle of Nagpur, also established de facto Maratha control over Orissa, which was formally incorporated in the Maratha Empire in 1752.

=== British influence and succession ===
Nawab Murshid Quli Khan was notorious for his repressive tax collection tactics, including torture for non-payment. Nawab Alivardi Khan's successor was Nawab Siraj-ud-Daulah. Nawab Siraj-ud-Daulah grew increasingly wary of the British presence in Bengal. He also feared invasions by the Durrani Empire from the north and Marathas from the west. On 20 June 1756, Nawab Siraj-ud-Daulah launched the siege of Calcutta, in which he won a decisive victory. The British were briefly expelled from Fort William, which came under the occupation of the Nawab's forces. The East India Company dispatched a naval fleet led by Robert Clive to regain control of Fort William. By January 1757, the British retook Fort William. The stalemate with the Nawab continued into June. The Nawab also began cooperating with the French East India Company, raising the ire of the British further. Britain and France were at the time pitted against each other in the Seven Years' War.

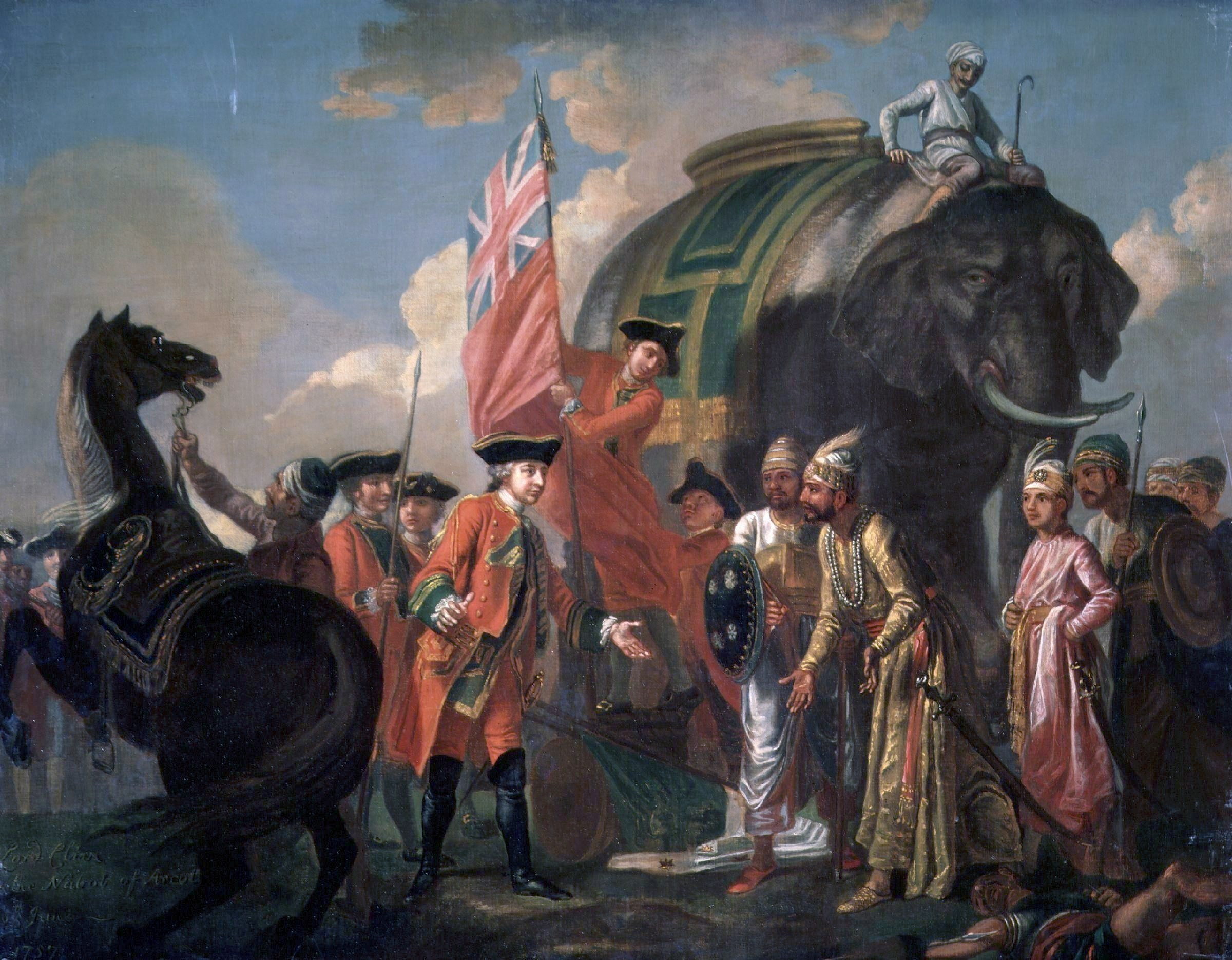
Robert Clive meets Mir Jafar at the Battle of Plassey in 1757

On 23 June 1757, the Battle of Plassey brought an end to the independence of the nawabs of Bengal. Nawab Siraj-ud-Daulah and his French allies were caught off guard by the defection of the Nawab's Commander-in-Chief Mir Jafar to the British side. The British, under the leadership of Robert Clive, gained enormous influence over Bengal Subah as a result of the battle. The last independent Nawab was arrested by his former officers and killed in revenge for the brutality against his courtiers.

Mir Jafar was installed as the puppet Nawab by the British. However, Jafar entered into a secret treaty with the Dutch East India Company. This caused the British to replace Mir Jafar with his son-in-law Mir Qasim in October 1760. In one of his first acts, Mir Qasim ceded Chittagong, Burdwan and Midnapore to the East India Company. Mir Qasim also proved to be a popular ruler. But Mir Qasim's independent spirit eventually raised British suspicions. Mir Jafar was reinstalled as Nawab in 1763. Mir Qasim continued opposing the British and his father-in-law. He set up his capital in Munger and raised an independent army. Mir Qasim attacked British positions in Patna, overrunning the company's offices and killing its Resident. Mir Qasim also attacked the British-allied Gorkha Kingdom. Mir Qasim allied with Nawab Shuja-ud-Daula of Awadh and Mughal emperor Shah Alam II. However, the Mughal allies were defeated at the Battle of Buxar in 1764, which was the last real chance of resisting British expansion across the northern Indian subcontinent.

The South Indian Kingdom of Mysore under Haider Ali and Tipu Sultan briefly eclipsed the dominant position of Bengal in the subcontinent. Tipu Sultan pursued aggressive military modernization; and set up a company to trade with communities around the Persian Gulf and the Arabian Sea. Mysore's military technology at one point rivaled European technology. However, the Anglo-Mysore War ended Tipu Sultan's ascendancy.

In 1765, Robert Clive, as the representative of the East India Company, was given the Diwani of Bengal by the Mughal emperor Shah Alam II. With this a system of dual governance was established, with the nawabs responsible for the Nizamat of Bengal and the company responsible for the Diwani of Bengal. In 1772, this arrangement came to be abolished and Bengal was brought under direct control of the British. In 1793, the Mughal emperor also ceded the Nizamat of Bengal to the company and the Nawab of Bengal was reduced to a mere titular position and pensioners of the company. After the Revolt of 1857, Company rule in India ended, and the British Crown, in 1858, took over the territories which were under direct rule of the company. This marked the beginning of Crown rule in India, and the nawabs had no political or any other kind of control over the territory. Mir Jafar's descendants continued to live in Murshidabad. The Hazarduari Palace (Palace of a Thousand Doors) was built as the residence of the nawabs in the 1830s. The palace was also used by British colonial officials.

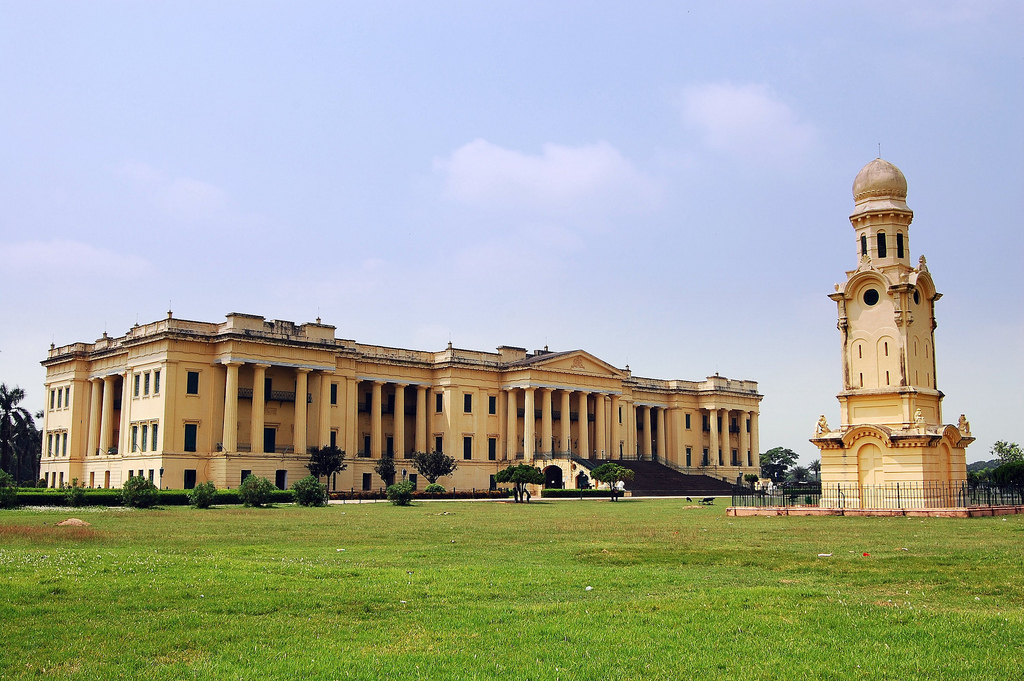
Hazarduari Palace (Palace of a Thousand Doors) was home to the titular nawabs of Bengal

Nawab Mansur Ali Khan was the last titular Nawab Nazim of Bengal. During his reign the nizamat at Murshidabad came to be debt-ridden. The Nawab left Murshidabad in February 1869, and had started living in England. The title of the Nawab of Bengal stood abolished in 1880. He returned to Bombay in October 1880 and pleaded his case against the orders of the government, but as it stood unresolved the Nawab renounced his styles and titles, abdicating in favour of his eldest son on 1 November 1880.

The nawabs of Murshidabad succeeded the Nawab Nazims following Nawab Mansur Ali Khan's abdication, The Nawab Bahadurs had ceased to exercise any significant power. but were relegated to the status of a zamindar and continued to be a wealthy family, producing bureaucrats and army officers.

=== Relations with the Zamindars of Bihar ===
The Zamindars of Bihar maintained a tenuous loyalty to the nawabs of Bengal. Rebellion and the withholding of revenue was a common feature of the Nawab period in Bihar. Although Bihar had the potential to provide a large amount of revenue and tax, records show that the nawabs were unable to extract any money from the chiefs of Bihar until 1748. And even following this, the amount gained was very low. This was again due to the rebellious nature of the zamindars who were "continually in arms".

=== Military campaigns ===
According to João de Barros, Bengal enjoyed military supremacy over Arakan and Tripura due to good artillery. Its forces possessed notable large cannons. It was also a major exporter of gunpowder and saltpeter to Europe. The Mughal Army built fortifications across the region, including Idrakpur Fort, Sonakanda Fort, Hajiganj Fort, Lalbagh Fort and Jangalbari Fort. The Mughals expelled Arakanese and Portuguese pirates from the northeastern coastline of the Bay of Bengal. Throughout the late medieval and early modern periods, Bengal was notable for its navy and shipbuilding. The following table covers a list of notable military engagements by Mughal Bengal:

Conflict	Bengal and allied forces	Opposition forces	Results
Conquest of Tripura (1729) Location: Tripura	Nawabs of Bengal; Jagat Manikya (Manikya dynasty)	Dharma Manikya (Manikya dynasty)	Victory: Bengali backed Jagat Manikya invades and successfully defeats Tripura (Dharma Manikya) in Udaipur; Jagat Manikya rules as a vassal of the nawabs of Bengal
Annexation of Bihar (1733) Location: Bihar	Nawabs of Bengal	Bihar Subah	Victory: Annexation of the Bihar Subah into the territory of the nawabs of Bengal.
Subduing of the Banjara (c.1733 - c.1740) Location: Bihar	Nawabs of Bengal	Banjaras	Victory
Subduing of the Bettiah Raj (c.1733 - c.1740) Location: Bihar	Nawabs of Bengal	Bettiah Raj	Victory: Raja Dhrub Singh fled from Bhettiah
Subduing of the Tekari Raj (c.1733 - c.1740) Location: Bihar	Nawabs of Bengal	Tekari Raj	Victory: Mustafa Khan of the Tekari raj employed as a General of Alivardi Khan
Subduing of the Chakwars tribe (c.1733 - c.1740) Location: Bihar	Nawabs of Bengal	Bettiah Raj	Victory: Chakwars pay an annual tribute
First Battle of Giria (1740) Location: Giria, Bengal	Nawabs of Bengal: Nasiri Dynasty	Nawabs of Bengal: Afshar Dynasty	Dynasty Change: Alivardi Khan takes the throne marking the end of the Nasiri Dynasty of Murshid Quli Khan.
Battle of Phulwarion (1741) Location: Phulbari, Bengal	Nawabs of Bengal	Governor of Orissa: Rustam Jang	Victory: Alivardi Khan defeated Rustam Jang, deputy governor of Orissa and a relative of Sarfaraz Khan
First Battle of Katwa (1742) Location: Katwa, Bengal	Nawabs of Bengal	Maratha Empire	Victory: The entire Maratha Army was evacuated out of Bengal; The Maratha commander Bhaskar Pant was killed.
First Battle of Midnapur (1742) Location: Midnapur, Bengal	Nawabs of Bengal	Maratha Empire	Victory: The Bengal forces defeated the Maratha forces and they were driven from Orissa beyond the Chilka lake.
Battle of Birbhum (1743) Location: Birbhum, Bengal	Nawabs of Bengal	Maratha Empire	Victory: Raghuji Bhonsle's Maratha army was expelled from Bengal
Second Battle of Katwa (1745) Location: Katwa, Bengal	Nawabs of Bengal	Maratha Empire	Victory: Raghuji Bhonsle was defeated by the Bengali army of Alivardi Khan.
Battle at Bhagalpur (1745) Location: Bihar	Nawabs of Bengal	Maratha Empire	Victory
1st Afghan Insurrection (1745) Location: Bihar	Nawabs of Bengal	Afghans of Bihar: Mustafa Khan	Victory: Retreat of Afghan troops; Mustafa regroups and forms a stronger army and attacking Patna; Zainuddin shot Mustafa Khan killing him instantaneously, thus crushing the Afghan army.
2nd Afghan Insurrection (1746) Location: Bihar	Nawabs of Bengal	Afghans of Bihar	Victory: Afghans along with their 6000 men retired to Dharbhanga (Tirhut).
Second Battle of Midnapur (1746) Location: Midnapur, Bengal	Nawabs of Bengal	Maratha Empire	Victory: Mir Jafar won a decisive battle against Mir Habib.
Battle of Burdwan (1747) Location: Burdwan, Bengal	Nawabs of Bengal	Maratha Empire	Victory: Alivardi Khan heavily repulsed and defeated the Marathas.
Battle of Rani Sarai (1748) Location, Bihar, Bengal Subah (Part of the third Afghan Insurrection And Maratha invasions of Bengal)	Nawabs of Bengal	Maratha Empire; Afghans of Bihar	Victory: Alivardi Khan defeated the allied Afghan and Maratha forces.
Third Battle of Midnapur (1749) Location: Midnapur, Bengal	Nawabs of Bengal	Maratha Empire	Victory
Battle of Cuttack (1749) Location: Cuttack, Bengal Subah	Nawabs of Bengal	Maratha Empire	Victory
Siege of Cuttack (1749) (1749) Location:Barabati fort	Nawabs of Bengal	Maratha Empire	Victory: Orissa recovered; Fort surrendered to the Nawab
Fourth Battle of Midnapur (1750) Location: Midnapur, Bengal	Nawabs of Bengal	Maratha Empire	Victory: Mir Habib retreats into the Jungle.
Fifth Maratha invasion of Bengal (1751) Location: Bengal	Nawabs of Bengal	Maratha Empire	Stalemate: Military Victory, Political Defeat; Peace treaty signed ending the Maratha invasions of Bengal.
Battle of Kandarpi Ghat (1753) Location: Kandarpi Ghat, Mithila	Nawabs of Bengal	Khandwala dynasty	Defeat: Maharaja Narendra Singh clashed against forces of the nawabs of Bengal led by Bhikhari Mahtha, an official of Alivardi Khan and emerged victorious.
Battle of Manihari (1756) Location: Manihari, Bengal Subah	Nawabs of Bengal: Siraj-ud-Daulah	Shaukat Jang	Victory: Siraj-ud-Daulah's rebellious cousin, Shakuat Jang is killed
Siege of Calcutta (First Anglo-Bengal War) (1756–1757) Location: Kolkata, Bengal	Nawabs of Bengal	United Kingdom: British East India Company	Victory: Treaty of Alinagar (Kolkata)
Battle of Makwanpur (1763) (1763) Location: Nepal	Nawabs of Bengal	Nepal	Defeat: Defeat and retreat of Mir Qasim
Sack of Delhi (1757) Location: Delhi, Mughal Empire	Mughal Empire; Bengal Maratha Confederacy	Durrani Empire	Defeat: Kashmir, Lahore, Multan, Sirhind, and all territories west of the Indus river are annexed by the Durrani Empire.
Battle of Plassey (Second Anglo-Bengal War) (1757) Location: Palashi, Bengal	Nawabs of Bengal France: French East India Company	United Kingdom: British East India Company	Defeat: Significant expansion of British influence over Bengal
1st Battle of Patna (1763) Location: Patna, Bengal Subah	Nawabs of Bengal	United Kingdom: British East India Company; Mir Jafar (defected to the British); Jagat Seth	Victory: British driven out of Patna
2nd Battle of Giria (1763) Location: Giria, Bengal	Nawabs of Bengal	United Kingdom: British East India Company	Defeat: Nawab Mir Jafar installed on the throne.
Third Anglo–Bengal War (Bengal War) (1763–1764) Location: Buxar, Bengal Subah	Nawabs of Bengal; Mughal Empire; Oudh	United Kingdom: British East India Company; Kashi Kingdom	Defeat: Treaty of Allahabad(1765). British East India Company granted Diwani rights, or the right to collect taxes on behalf of the Emperor from the eastern province of Bengal

== List of nawabs ==
The following is a list of the nawabs of Bengal. Sarfaraz Khan and Mir Jafar were the only two to become Nawab Nazim twice. The chronology started in 1717 with Murshid Quli Khan and ended in 1880 with Mansur Ali Khan.

=== Independent Rulers ===
Portrait	Titular Name	Personal Name	Birth	Reign	Death
Nasiri dynasty
	Jaafar Khan Bahadur Nasiri	Murshid Quli Khan	1665	1717–30 June 1727	30 June 1727
	Ala-ud-Din Haidar Jung	Sarfaraz Khan	1700	1727–1727 (for few days)	29 April 1740
	Shuja ud-Daula	Shuja-ud-Din Muhammad Khan	1670	1 July 1727 – 26 August 1739	26 August 1739
	Ala-ud-Din Haidar Jung	Sarfaraz Khan	1700	26 August 1739 – 29 April 1740	29 April 1740
Afshar dynasty
	Hashim ud-Daula	Alivardi Khan	Before 10 May 1671	29 April 1740 – 9 April 1756	9 April 1756
	Mansur-ul-Mulk Siraj-ud-Daulla	Siraj ud-Daulah	1733	9 April 1756 – 23 June 1757	2 July 1757

=== Puppet rulers under British influence ===
Portrait	Titular Name	Personal Name	Birth	Reign	Death
Najafi dynasty
	Ja'afar 'Ali Khan Bahadur	Mir Jafar	1691	2 June 1757 – 20 October 1760	17 January 1765
	Itimad ud-Daulah	Mir Qasim	1720	20 October 1760 – 7 July 1763	8 May 1777
	Ja'afar 'Ali Khan Bahadur	Mir Jafar	1691	25 July 1763 – 17 January 1765	17 January 1765
	Najm ud-Daulah	Najmuddin Ali Khan	1750	5 February 1765 – 8 May 1766	8 May 1766
	Saif ud-Daulah	Najabut Ali Khan	1749	22 May 1766 – 10 March 1770	10 March 1770
		Ashraf Ali Khan	1740	10 March 1770 – 24 March 1770	24 March 1770
	Mubarak ud-Daulah	Mubarak Ali Khan	1759	21 March 1770 – 6 September 1793	6 September 1793
	Azud ud-Daulah	Baber Ali Khan	1760	1793 – 28 April 1810	28 April 1810
	Ali Jah	Zain-ud-Din Ali Khan	1785	5 June 1810 – 6 August 1821	6 August 1821
	Walla Jah	Ahmad Ali Khan	1760	1821 – 30 October 1824	30 October 1824
	Humayun Jah	Mubarak Ali Khan II	29 September 1810	1824 – 3 October 1838	3 October 1838
	Feradun Jah	Mansur Ali Khan	29 October 1830	29 October 1838 – 1 November 1880 (abdicated)	5 November 1884

== See also ==
- Nawabs of Murshidabad
- Maratha invasions of Bengal
- Battle of Plassey
- Bengal Presidency
