= Jafarganj Cemetery =

Islamic cemetery in Murshidabad, Bengal, India

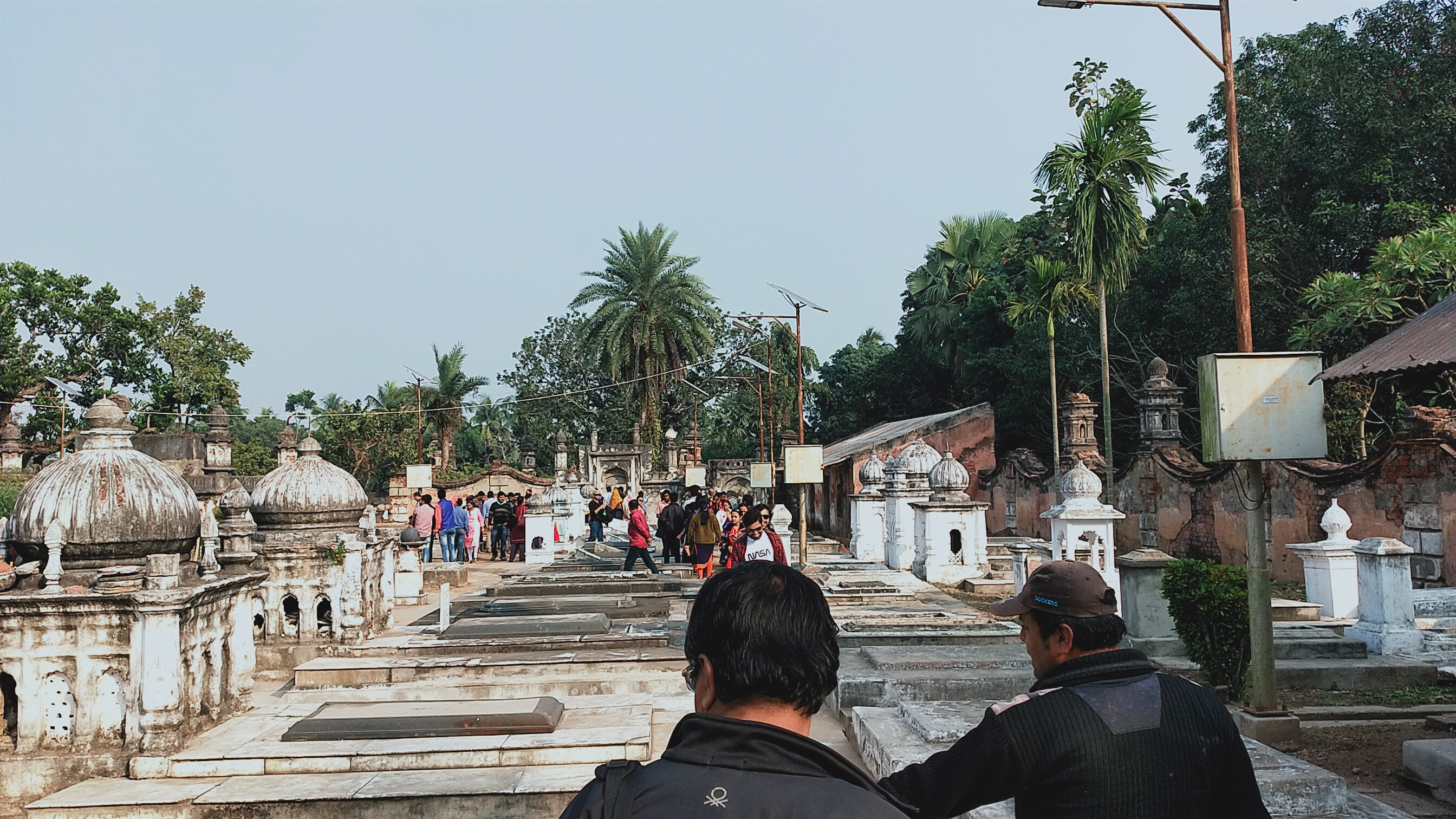
- The burials at the Jafarganj Cemetery
- Interactive map of Jafarganj Cemetery

Details
- Location: Murshidabad, West Bengal, India
- Coordinates: 24°12′03″N 88°15′45″E
- Type: Islamic

Jafarganj Cemetery is a heritage muslim cemetery located in Murshidabad, West Bengal, India.

== Geography ==
Murshidabad
F: facility, H: historical site
Owing to space constraints in the small map, the actual locations in a larger map may vary slightly

=== Location ===
Jafraganj Cemetery is located at 24°12′03″N 88°15′45″E.

The Namak Haram Deorhi, House of Jagat Seth, Nashipur Rajbari, Kathgola Palace and Tomb of Azimunissa Begum are all located nearby. One can reach the temple town of Rani Bhavani at Baranagar, on the other side of the Bhagirathi, by country boat from Ajimganj.

Note: The map alongside presents some of the notable locations in Murshidabad city. Most of the places marked in the map are linked in the larger full screen map. A few, without pages yet, remain unmarked. The map has a scale. It will help viewers to find out the distances.

== History ==
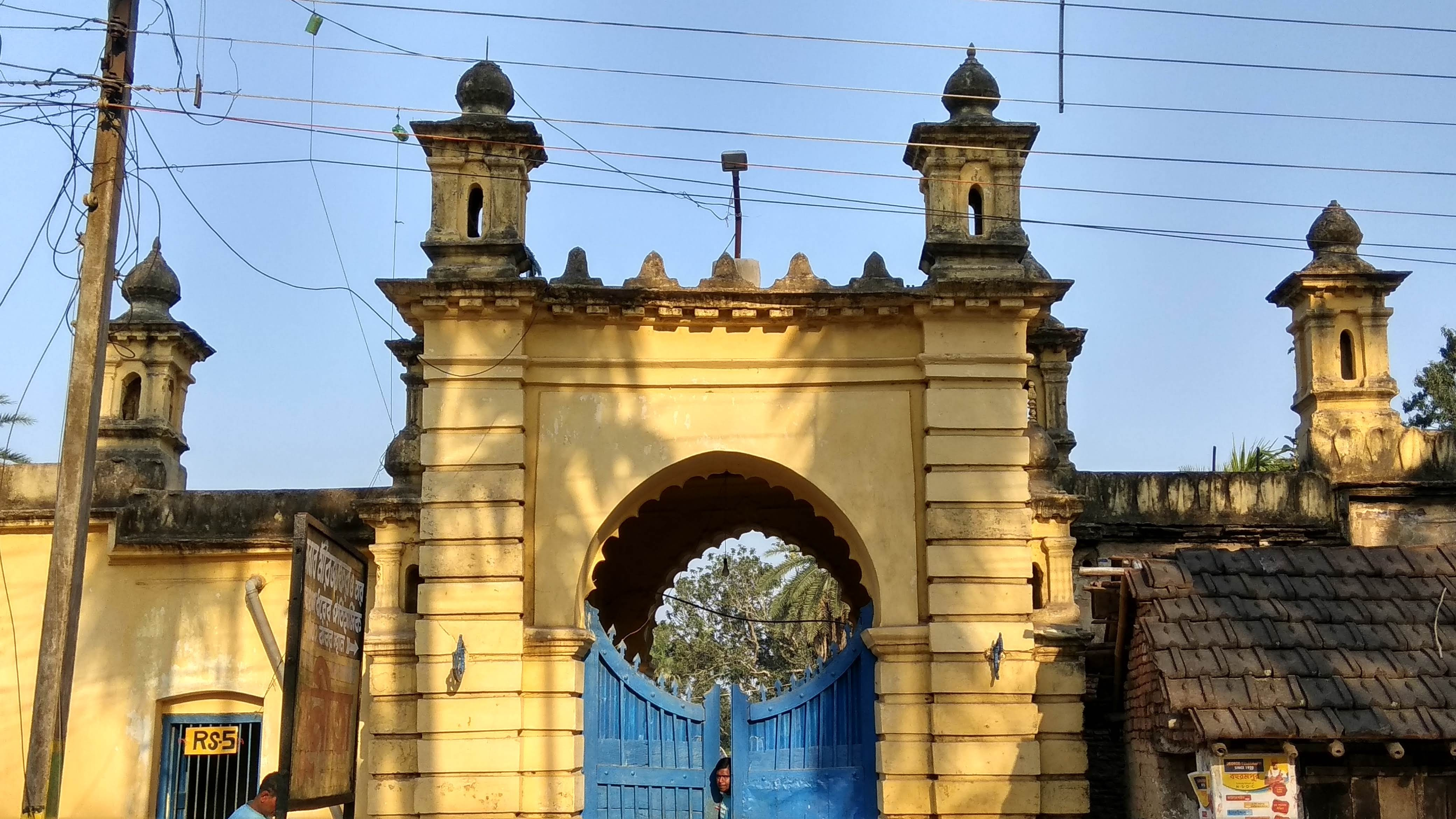
Main entrance of the Jafarganj Cemetery

It hosts the graves of the later Nawabs of Bengals of the Najafi dynasty, starting from Mir Jafar, and their family members while Khushbagh, which was built by Nawab Alivardi Khan, hosts the graves of the Nawabs of Bengal belonging to the Afshar dynasty and their family members.

It is said that earlier there was a "Kitchen Garden" at the site of this cemetery which Shah Khanaum Begum (Mir Jafar's wife and Alivardi Khan's sister) was very fond of.

== Gallery ==
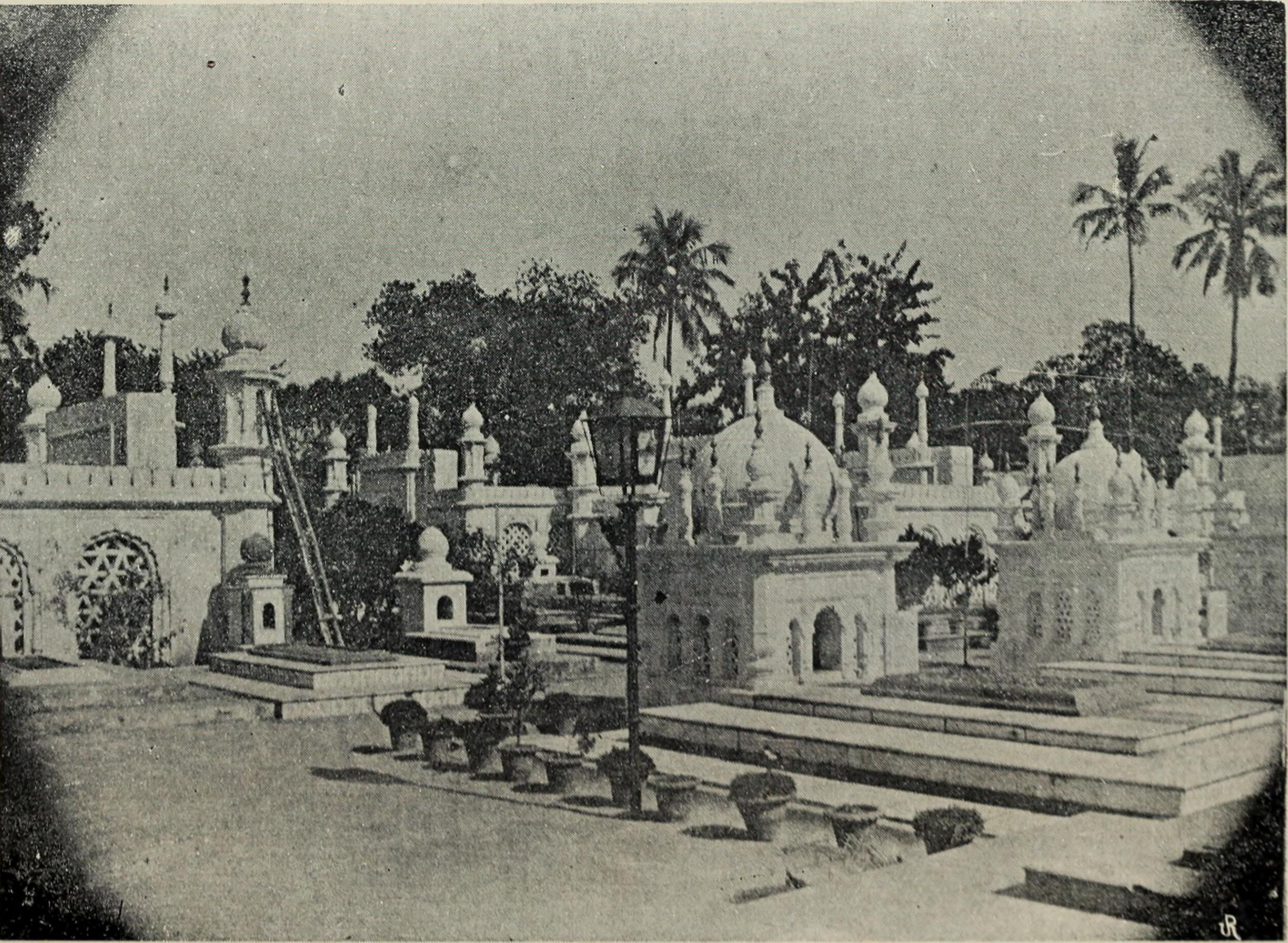
This is a picture of Jaffraganj Cemetery from the book, The Musnud of Murshidabad (1704-1904), published in 1905. Jaffraganj Cemetery is described as “the family burial ground of Meer Jaffer, containing the tombs of the Nawabs Nazim, from Meer Jaffer to HumajunJah”.

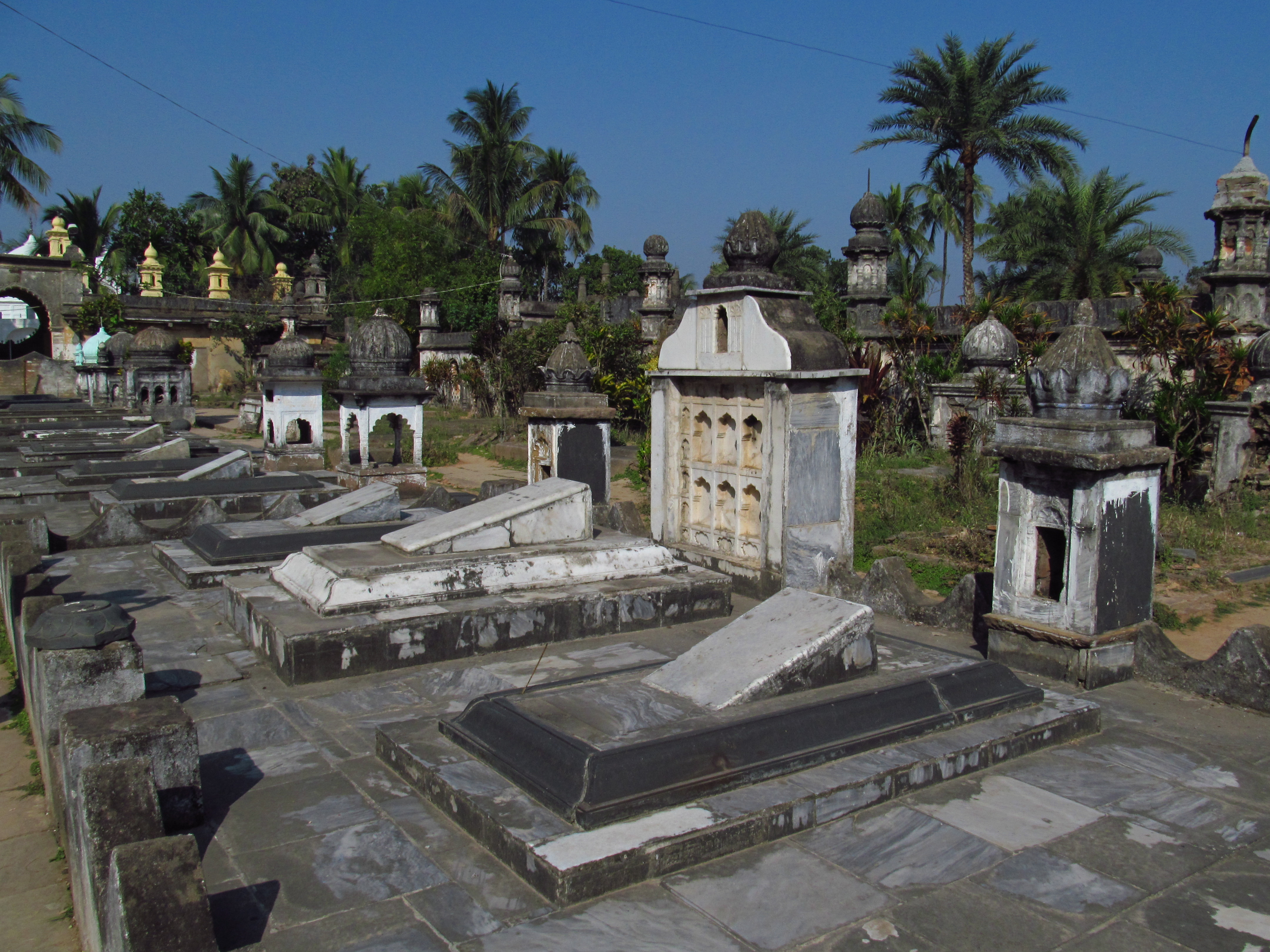
Jafaraganj Cemetery in 2013
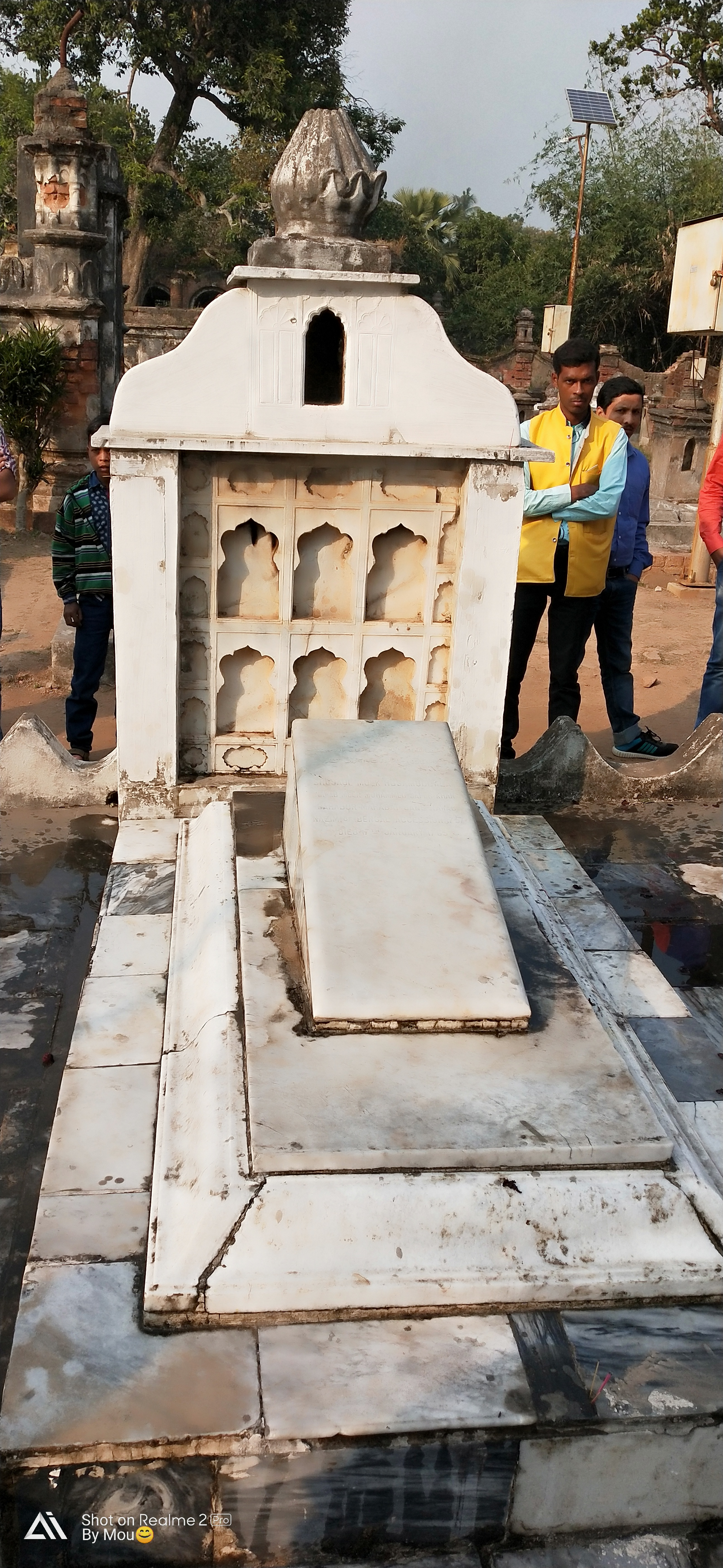
Tomb of Mir Jafar

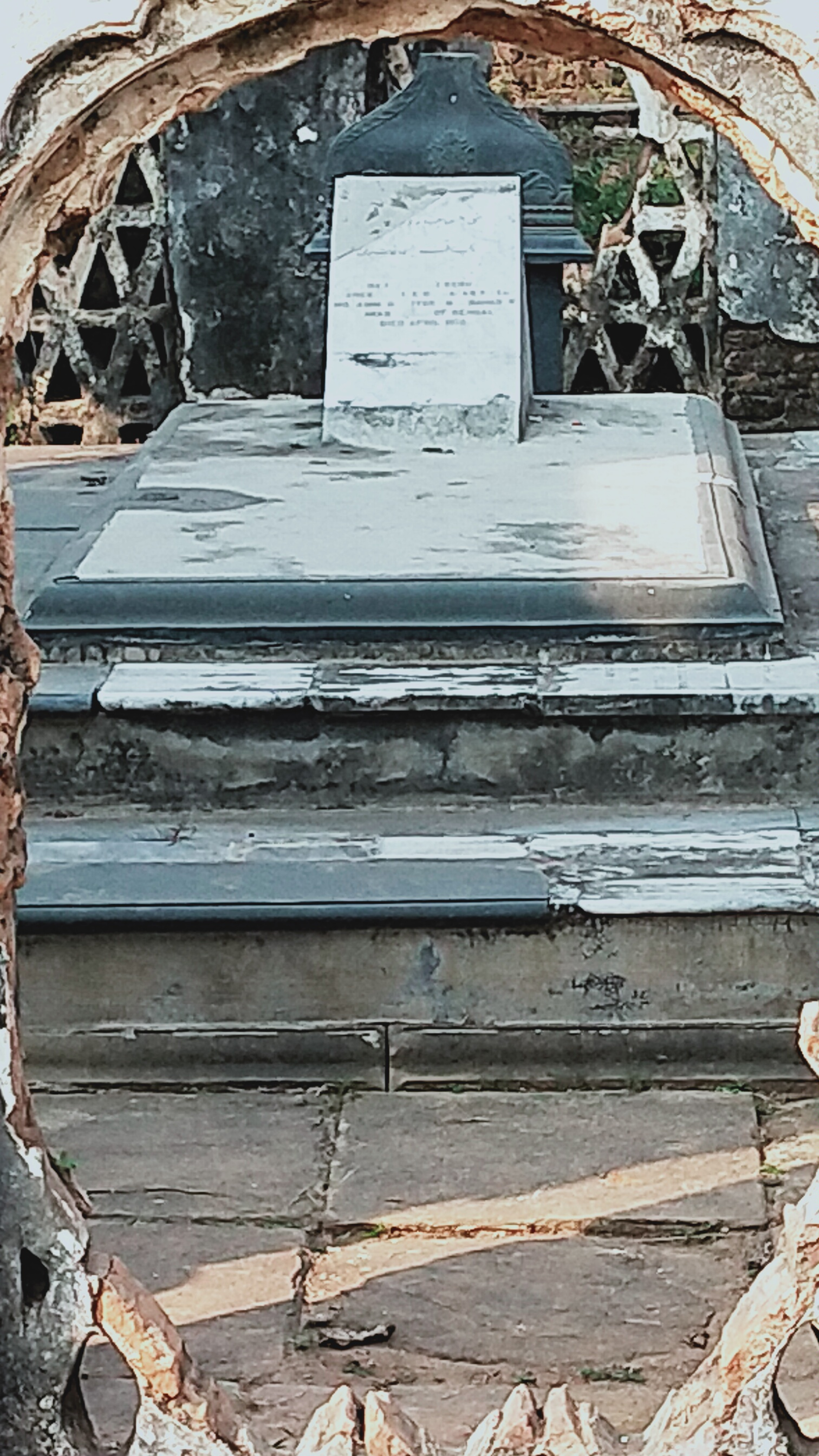
Tomb of Munni Begum

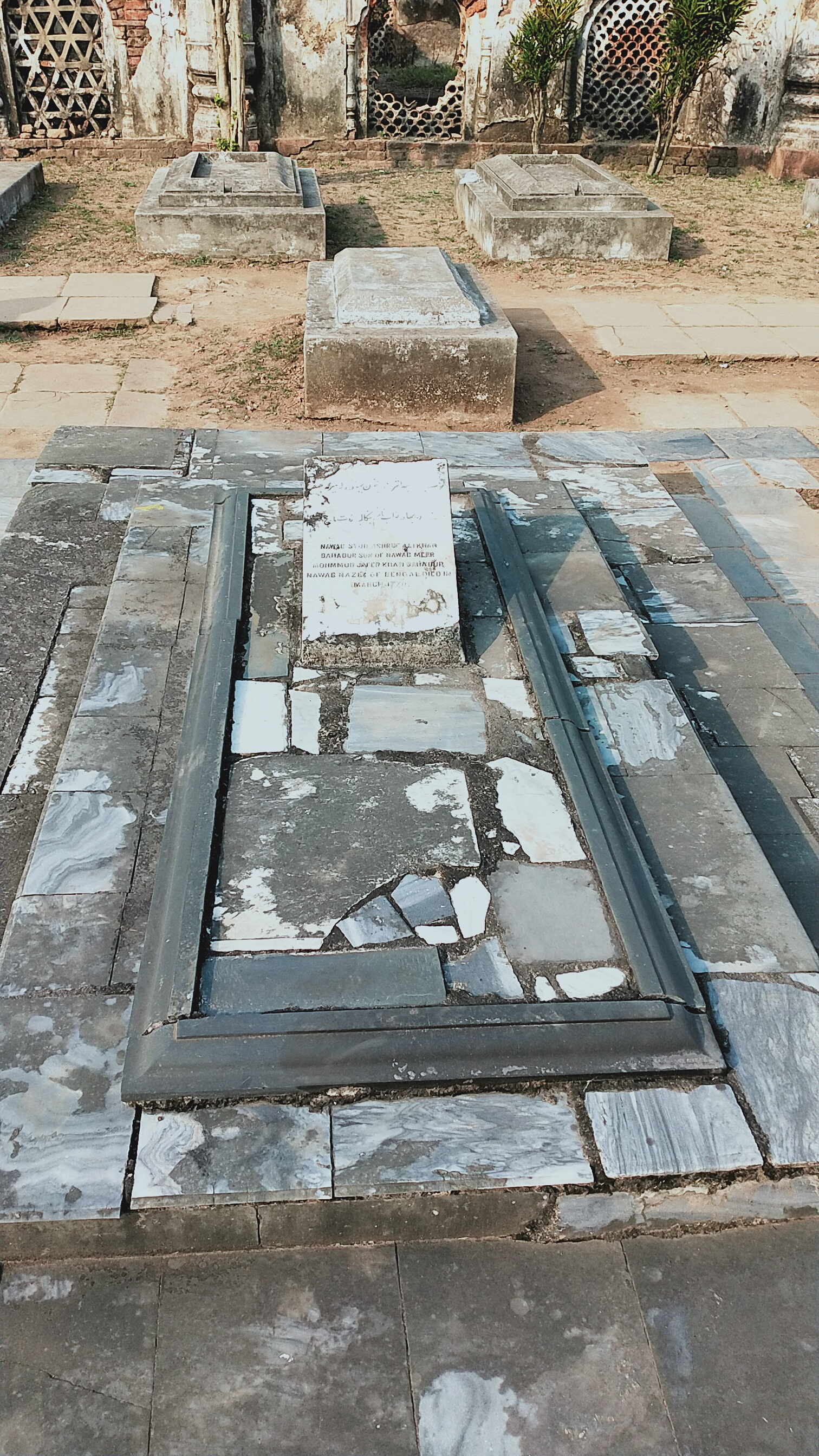
Tomb of Ashraf Ali Khan

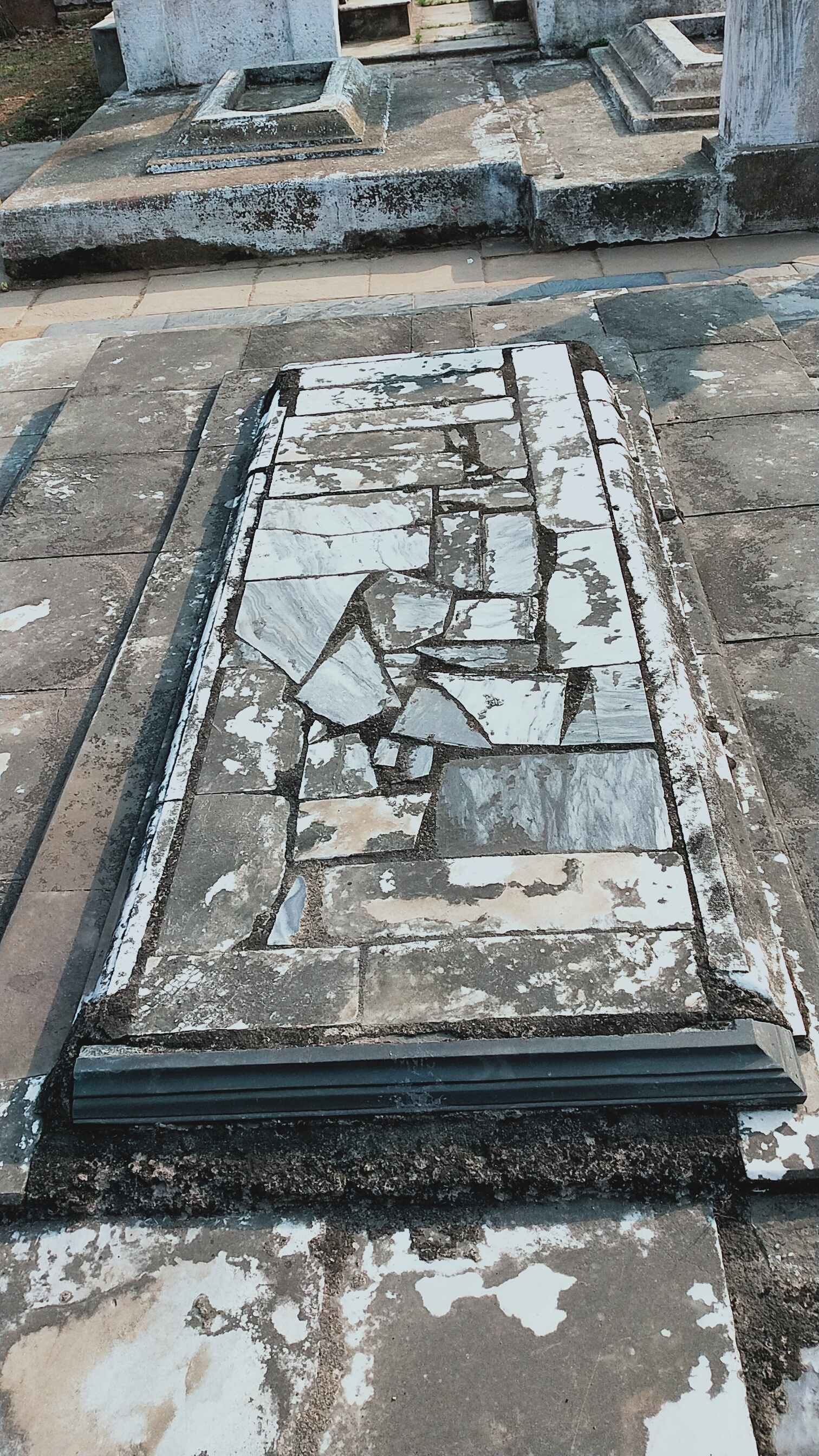
Tomb of Mubarak Ali Khan I

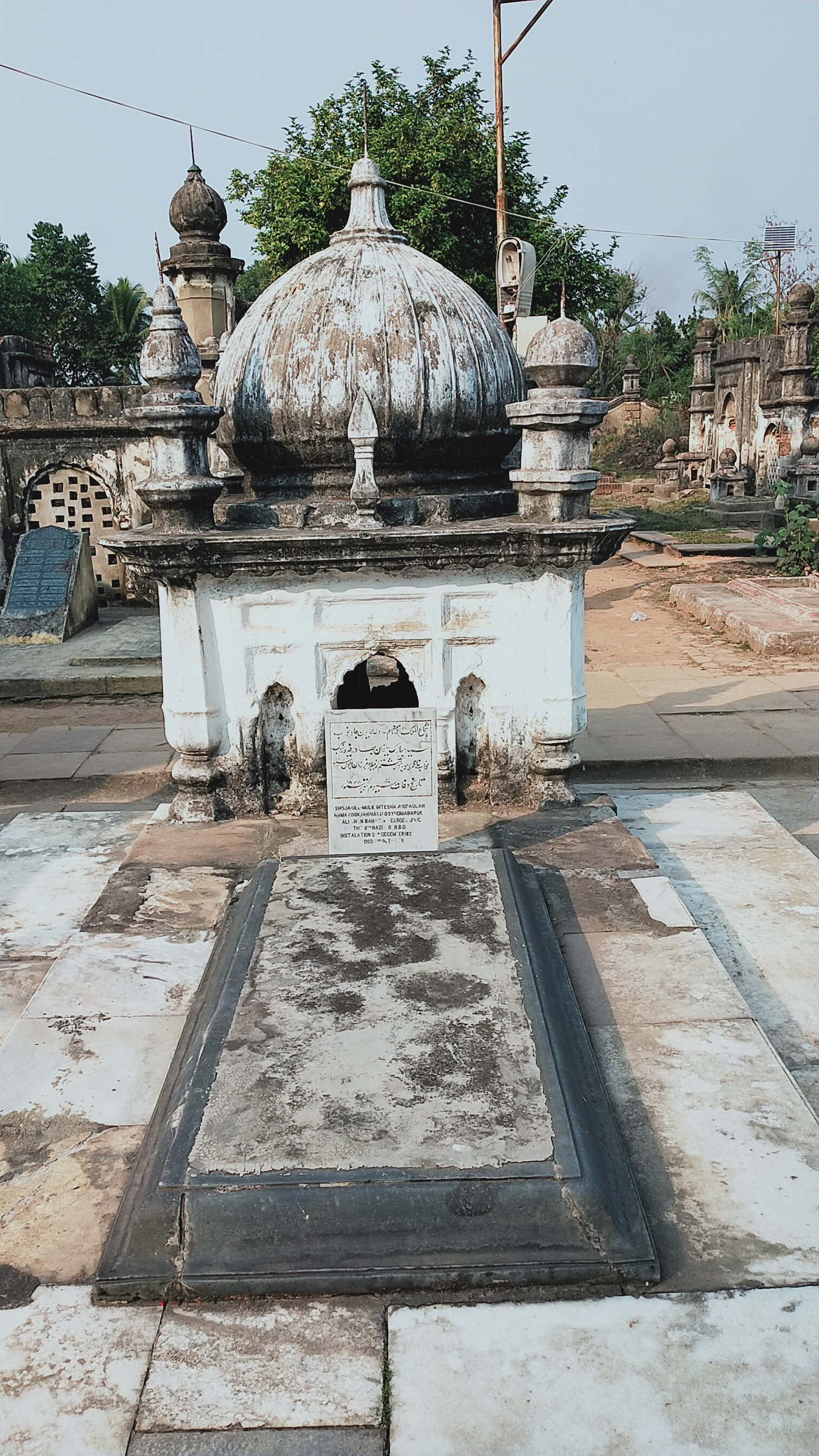
Tomb of Mubarak Ali Khan II (Humayun Jah)

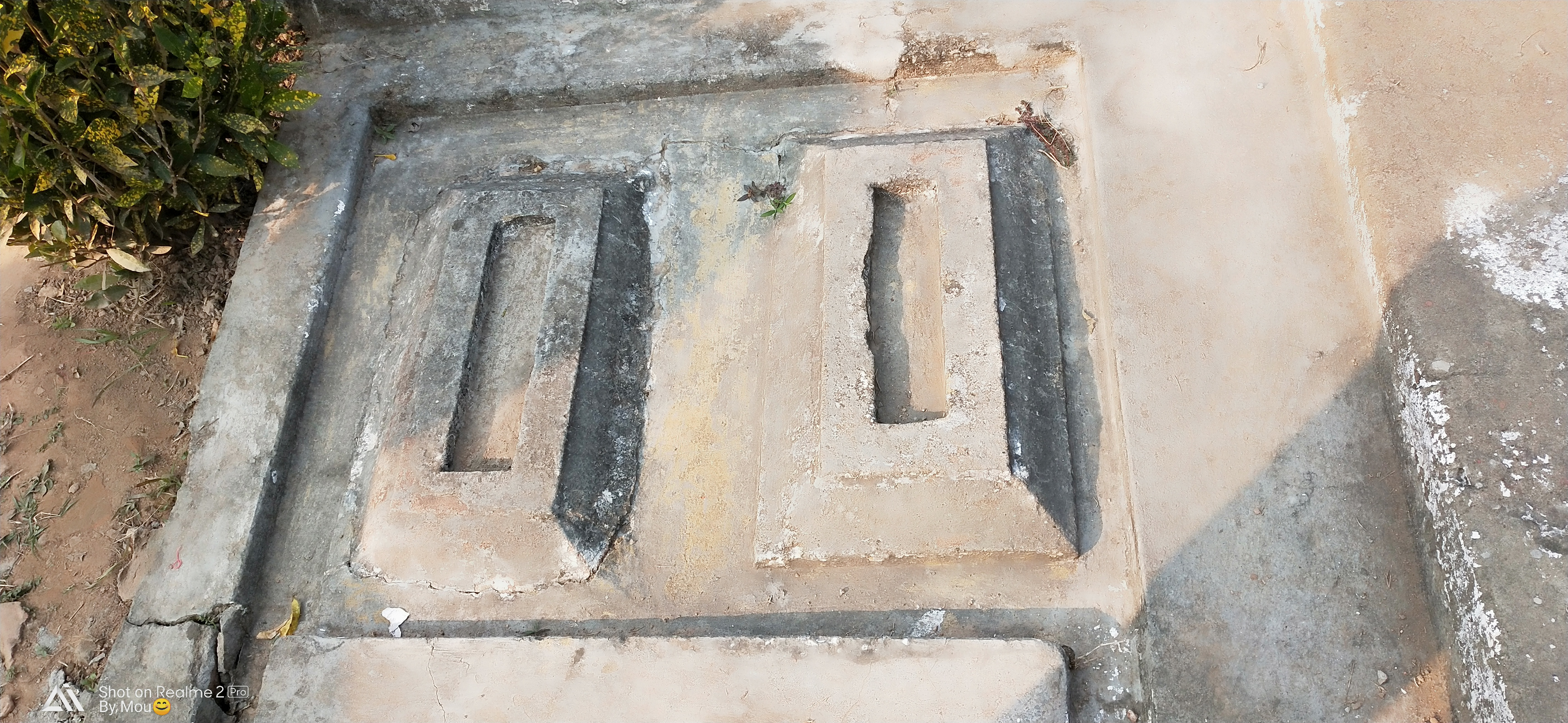
Tomb of Hira and Panna, two messenger pigeons

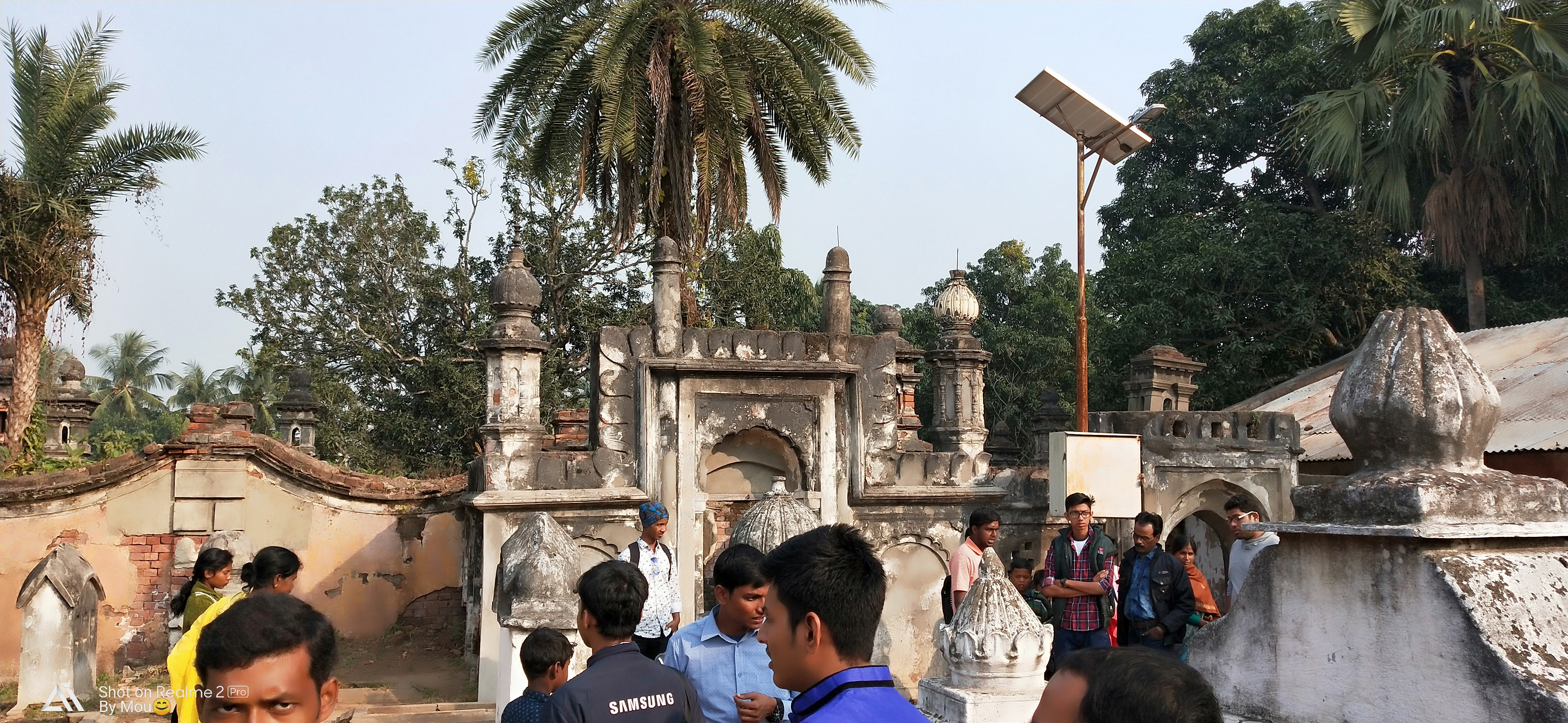
Mosque inside the cemetery

== See also ==
- Nawabs of Bengal
