= Clock Tower of Murshidabad =

Coordinates: 24.187381°N 88.269315°E

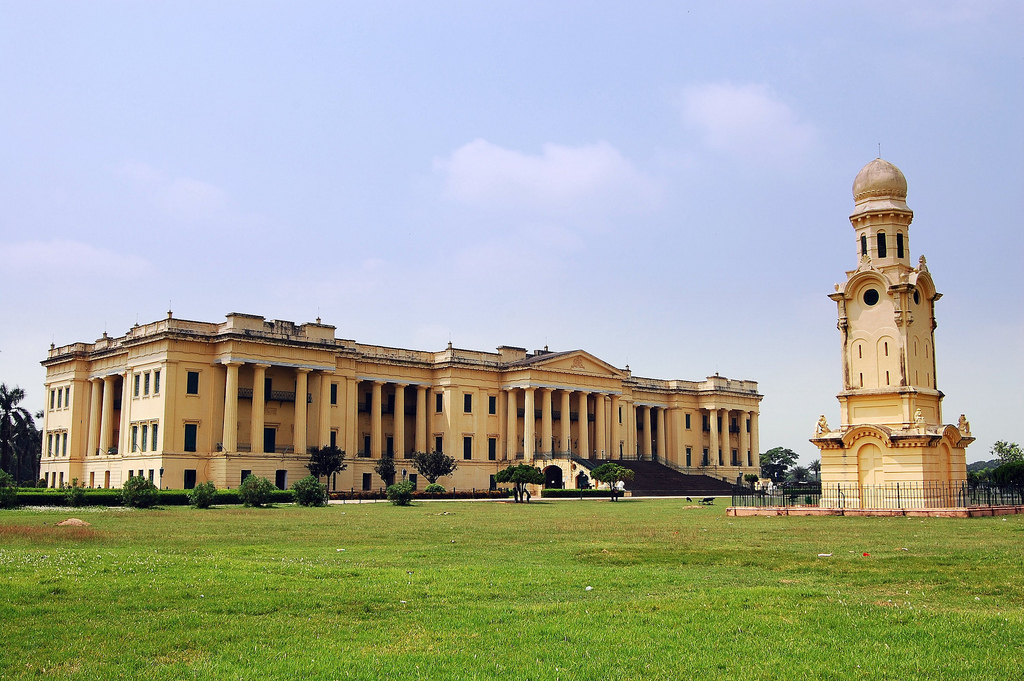
- The Clock Tower in the right seen with the Hazarduari Palace.
- Interactive map of the Clock Tower of Murshidabad area
- Alternative names: Ghari Ghar or Big Ben of Murshidabad

General information
- Status: Completed
- Type: Clock Tower
- Location: Nizamat Fort Campus, Murshidabad, India

Design and construction
- Architect: Sagore Mistri

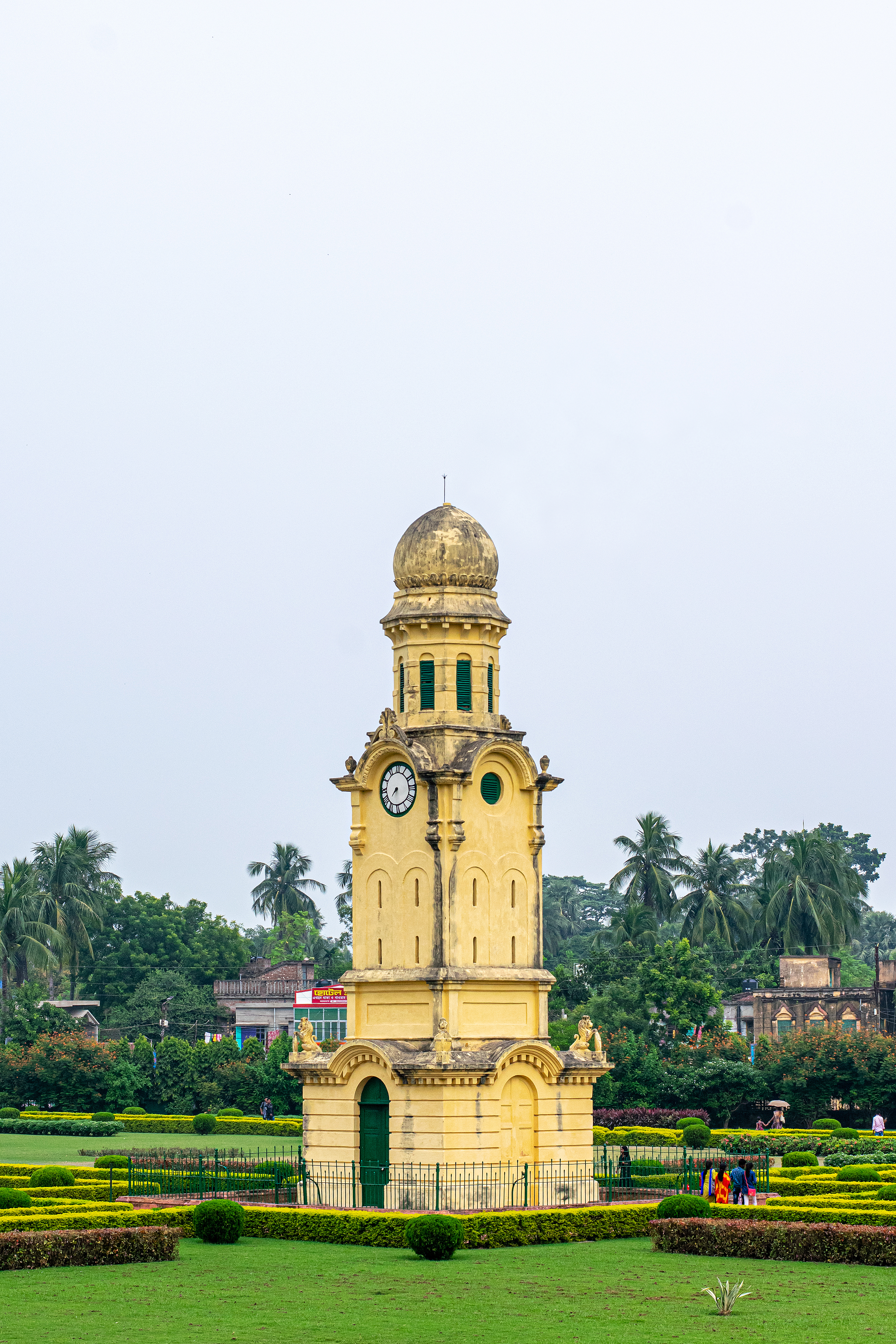
Clock Tower of Murshidabad

The Clock Tower of Murshidabad (locally known just as Clock Tower or Ghari Ghar, also known as Big Ben of Murshidabad) is a clock tower in the Nizamat Fort Campus in West Bengal, India. The clock tower stands in the garden space between the Nizamat Imambara and the Hazarduari Palace; to its east, hardly a few feet away, is the old Madina Mosque and the Bacchawali Tope.

The clock tower was designed by Sagor Mistri, an Indian Bengali assistant of Colonel McLeod, the architect of the Hazarduari Palace.

The clock tower is surmounted by a heavy sounding bell. Four masonry shields are placed on the ground level four corners. The dial of the clock tower faces eastwards, towards the Bhagirathi River, most probably for the sailors and passengers travelling on boats.

== Map ==
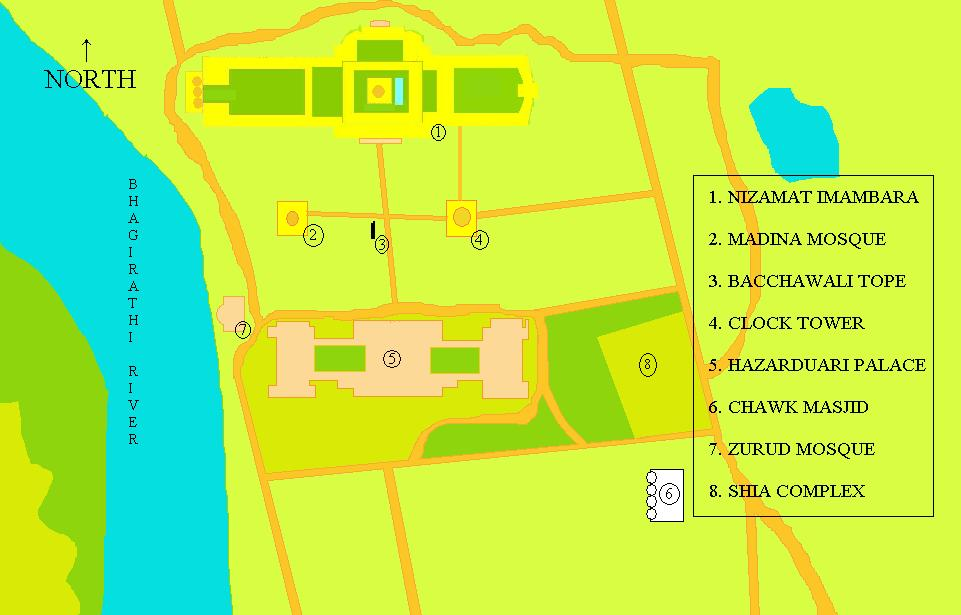
A map of the full Nizamat Fort Campus (excluding Wasef Manzil, Dakshin Darwaza or the South Gate of the campus, Nawab Bahadur's Institution and the South Zurud Mosque) showing the Nizamat Imambara in yellow and other buildings surrounding it, like the Madina Mosque, the Hazarduari Palace, Chawk Masjid, Bacchawali Tope, the clock tower, Shia Complex and the Zurud Mosque (North).
