= Abbas Ali Meerza =

Nawab Bahadur of Murshidabad (de facto)
- Reign: 13 August 2014 – present (pretender)
- Predecessor: Waris Ali Mirza
- Born: 1942 (age 83–84); Murshidabad, Bengal, British India
- House: Najafi Dynasty
- Father: Mohammed Sadeque Ali Mirza
- Mother: Hashmat un-nisa Begum
- Religion: Shia Islam

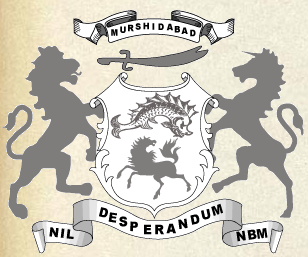
The Coat of Arms of the Nawab Bahadur of Murshidabad

Syed Mohammed Abbas Ali Meerza (Bengali: সৈয়দ মহম্মদ আব্বাস আলী মীর্জা; born 1942) is the heir of the last Nawab Bahadur of Murshidabad. He has been so since the Supreme Court of India declared him to be the lawful heir in August 2014. The royal title had been in abeyance since the death of his maternal uncle Waris Ali Meerza (the third Nawab Bahadur of Murshidabad) in 1969.

== Early life ==
Abbas Ali Meerza is the eldest son of Syed Md. Sadeque Ali Meerza (d.1959) and Sahibzadi Hashmat un-nisa Begum (d.1995), a daughter of Wasif Ali Meerza, the second Nawab Bahadur of Murshidabad. Abaas Ali Meerza's paternal grandmother, Khurshid un-nisa Begum Sahiba (who married Syed Zaigham Meerza) is again the daughter of the first Nawab Bahadur of Murshidabad, Hassan Ali Meerza, the grandfather of Waris Ali Meerza.

== Title ==
The title would have been passed down to the children of Waris Ali Meerza upon his death in 1969 had they not been either disinherited by their father, predeceased him or had excluded themselves from the succession under Indian law by adopting foreign citizenship.

Waris Ali Meerza died in 1969, survived by his three sons and three daughters. According to the Nawab's law, the eldest son of the Nawab was to succeed him, however, Waris Ali's eldest son, Wakif Ali Meerza, was excluded from succession by his father for contracting a non-Muslim marriage and for not professing the Muslim religion. Waris Ali took no steps during his lifetime to establish his succession. Before declaring a successor Waris Ali then died.

No clear successor to Waris Ali emerged. The other children of Waris Ali moved to the United Kingdom and became citizens, sacrificing any claim over the title. A legal battle ensued, in which Abbas Ali Meerza won, making the then 72-year-old the fourth Nawab Bahadur of Murshidabad.

"I have links on both sides. My mother was the daughter of the second Nawab Bahadur while my father was his nephew. I thus received the title that would have gone to my cousins had they not settled in England."
Abbas Ali Mirza Khan Bahadur, Nawab of Murshidabad

The Nawab, who lives in Murshidabad, launched a separate legal challenge to see his that his family's ancestral property, the Murshidbad Estate (the private and personal properties of the Nawab Bahadur of Murshidabad), which under an Act was passed on to the state government of West Bengal be returned.

Abbas Ali Meerza Born: 1942
Preceded by Waris Ali Meerza	Nawab Bahadur of Murshidabad; 2014–present	Succeeded by Incumbent
