= Sahibzadi Shajar Ara Begum =

Sahibzadi Shajar Ara Begum (August 15, 1926 - December 27, 2000) was one of the daughters of Waris Ali Mirza by one of his wives, Zeenat-un-nisa Begum. The princess’ father, Waris Ali Mirza was the Nawab of Murshidabad. Shajar Ara Begum was born and educated in India but she moved to London in 1961. She kept herself involved in several charities, fundraising for Marie Curie Cancer Care, UNICEF and Anti Slavery International. Shajar Ara Begum was also the Vice President of the English Speaking Unions for South East Asia and a member of the Royal Society of St. George and also of the European Atlantic. She was also a patron of the ASHA Foundation, the Russian Orphans Organization and the Voice.

== Notes ==
- Waris Ali Mirza and his family
