= Lyn Innes =

Australian-born British academic (born 1940)

- Born: Catherine Lynette Innes; 1940 (age 85–86); Australia
- Other name: C. L. Innes
- Education: University of Sydney; University of Oregon; Cornell University
- Occupations: Academic and author
- Organisation(s): University of Kent, Canterbury
- Notable work: The Last Prince of Bengal: A Family's Journey from an Indian Palace to the Australian Outback (2021)
- Spouse: Martin Scofield
- Children: 2
- Relatives: Mansur Ali Khan (great-grandfather)

Lyn Innes (born 1940) is an Australian-born British academic and author, who is Emeritus Professor of Postcolonial Literatures at the University of Kent at Canterbury. Her interest is in studies of cultural nationalism, with her work focusing on Irish, African, African-American and Caribbean literatures, in which field she has been a scholar of note for more than five decades. As a great-granddaughter of the last Nawab of Bengal, Mansur Ali Khan, Innes is the author of a family memoir entitled The Last Prince of Bengal: A Family's Journey from an Indian Palace to the Australian Outback (2021).

== Background ==
Catherine Lynette Innes was born in Australia and, living on a remote mountain farm, was educated at home, before going to boarding-school and university in Sydney. After receiving her BA degree from the University of Sydney, in 1963 she moved to North America to do postgraduate studies, earning an M.A. from the University of Oregon. She also taught at several American universities, including Tuskegee Institute, a historically black college, founded by Booker T. Washington in 1881. There she developed her interest in cultural nationalism, focusing on Irish, African, African-American and Caribbean literatures, on which topic she earned a Ph.D. from Cornell University in 1973. From 1973 to 1975, she taught at the University of Massachusetts, Amherst, where she became associate editor of OKIKE: An African Journal of New Writing, founded by Chinua Achebe, with whom she also co-edited two volumes of African short stories.

In 1975, Innes moved to England and taught postcolonial literatures at the University of Kent, where she is now Emeritus Professor. She was the founding President of ATCAL, the Association for the Teaching of African, Asian and Caribbean Literatures, which published the literary magazine Wasafiri, of which Innes has remained a board member since 1984.

Books she has written include The Devil's Own Mirror: the Irish and the African in Modern Literature (1990), Chinua Achebe (1990), A History of Black and South Asian Writing in Britain (2002), The Cambridge Introduction to Postcolonial Literatures in English (2007), and Ned Kelly (2008), as well as editing the autobiographical narratives of Francis Fedric, a fugitive slave who lived in England between 1857 and 1865 (Slave Life in Virginia and Kentucky, 2010).

More recently, The Last Prince of Bengal: A Family's Journey from an Indian Palace to the Australian Outback (2021) is a family memoir that tells "the stories of her antecedents, using both family history and source materials from the time, while giving a fascinating insight into the British Raj in India from the perspective of a local prince who was mistreated, and ultimately deposed, by the British authorities. Charting the course of two diverse and multiracial generations of the family, which stretches from the palace in Murshidabad to London and rural Australia, Innes found a commonality in their lives." As described by the reviewer for Indian Link: "It is an eye-opening saga not only for its compelling plot but also for the truths it uncovers about the British Empire and the injustices faced by millions as a result of their regime."

In 2025, she published Fugitive Families: Making Black Lives Matter in Victorian Britain (Lutterworth Press), exploring the lives of five former slaves and free Back people who sought asylum in Britain in the 1850s and became celebrated abolitionist speakers.

Innes has also written for such publications as The Guardian and Times Higher Education.

=== Personal life ===
Innes is a great-granddaughter of Mansur Ali Khan – the Nawab Nazim of Bengal from 1838 until his abdication in 1880 – from his marriage to Sarah Vennell, an English hotel maid; they lived together in London for 10 years and had six children. The youngest child emigrated to Australia in 1925, and was Innes' grandfather, whose story she told in her 2021 book, The Last Prince of Bengal: A Family's Journey from an Indian Palace to the Australian Outback. She has said that she thinks of herself as "an Australian of Scottish, Indian and English descent".

Innes and her husband Martin Scofield have two daughters.

== Works ==
- (Co-editor with Bernth Lindfors) Critical Perspectives on Chinua Achebe (Washington, DC: Three Continents Press, 1978), ISBN 978-0-914478-45-4.
- Arrow of God: A Critical View (Collins, 1985)
- (Co-editor with Chinua Achebe) African Short Stories (Heinemann International, 1985), ISBN 978-0435902704.
- The Devil's Own Mirror: the Irishman and the African in Modern Literature (Washington, DC: Three Continents Press, 1990)
- Chinua Achebe: A Critical Study (Cambridge University Press, 1990)
- (Co-editor with Chinua Achebe) The Heinemann Book of Contemporary African Short Stories (Oxford: Heinemann, 1992), ISBN 0-435-90566-X.
- Woman and Nation in Irish Literature and Society, 1880–1935 (1993)
- A History of Black and South Asian Writing in Britain, 1700–2000 (2002, 2008)
- The Cambridge Introduction to Postcolonial Literatures in English (Cambridge University Press, 2007), ISBN 978-0521833400.
- Ned Kelly: Icon of Modern Culture (Helm Information, 2008), ISBN 978-1903206164.
- The Last Prince of Bengal: A Family's Journey from an Indian Palace to the Australian Outback (Saqi, 2021), ISBN 9781908906465.
- Fugitive Families: Making Black Lives Matter in Victorian Britain (The Lutterworth Press, 2025), ISBN 978-0718898144.
