= New Palace =

New Palace can refer to:

- The former name of Topkapı Palace in Istanbul after its completion (in Turkish: Yeni Sarayı)
- New Palace, Potsdam (in German: Neues Palais)
- New Palace, Stuttgart (German: Neues Schloss)
- New Palace, Murshidabad in West Bengal, India
- New Palace, another name for Shree Chhatrapati Shahu Museum, Kolhapur, India
- one of the buildings in the Lazzaretto of Manoel Island, Gżira, Malta
