= Nawabs of Murshidabad =

Aristocratic family of Bengal

Nawab of Murshidabad
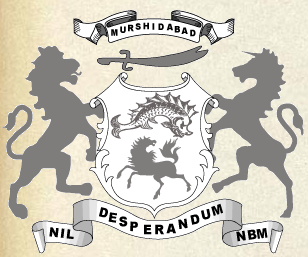
- Creation date: 1882
- First holder: Hassan Ali Mirza
- Last holder: Waris Ali Mirza
- Present holder: Abbas Ali Meerza (pretender)
- Extinction date: 1969
- Seats: Hazarduari Palace; Wasif Manzil

Nawab Bahadur of Murshidabad (Bengali: মুর্শিদাবাদের নবাব বাহাদুর), or simply Nawab of Murshidabad, was a hereditary title of Bengal akin to a Western peerage. They were direct descendants of the former nawabs of Bengal, who were the de facto rulers of Bengal, and inherited their estates and property. The inaugural holder was Hassan Ali Mirza. After the death of Waris Ali Mirza in 1969, the title was held in abeyance and later abolished. In August 2014, the Indian Supreme Court ruled that his nephew, Abbas Ali Meerza, was a rightful heir of the nawabs of Murshidabad.

== History ==
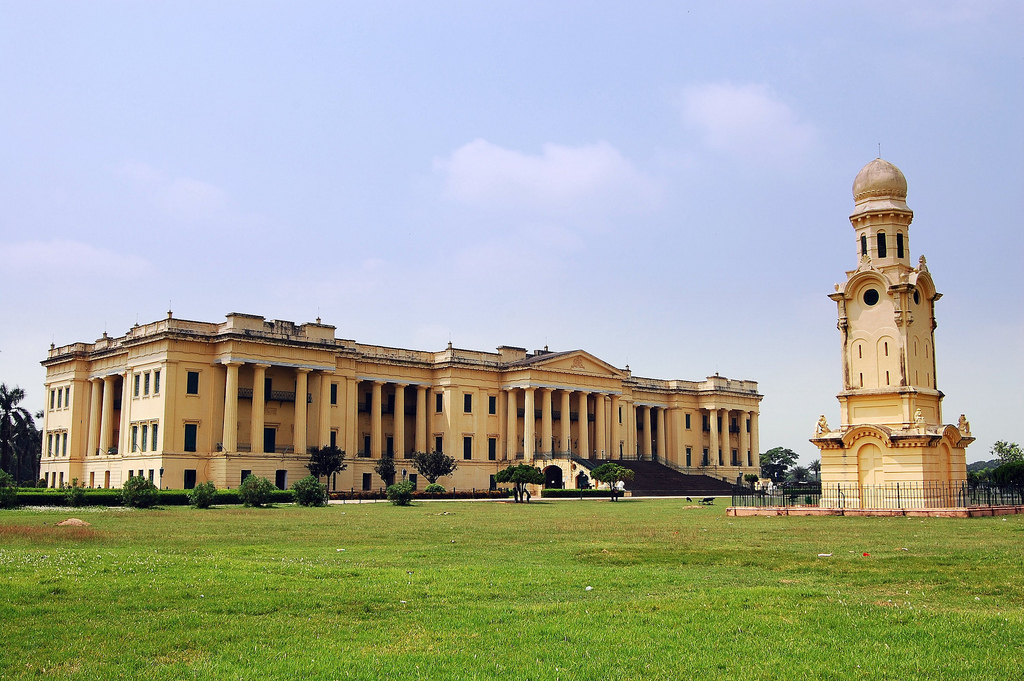
The Hazarduari Palace was the seat of the titular Nawabs of Murshidabad.

The title Nawab of Murshidabad was used an alternative for the nawabs of Bengal, as they were based in the city of Murshidabad, founded by the inaugural nawab of Bengal, Murshid Quli Khan. The title continued to be used synonymously until the time of Nawab Mansur Ali Khan, who was the last titular nawab nazim of Bengal. During his reign, the nizamat (princeship) at Murshidabad came to be debt-ridden. The Nawab left Murshidabad in February 1869, and had started living in England. The title Nawab of Bengal stood abolished in 1880. In October 1880, he went to Bombay, pleading his case against the orders of the British Raj, but as it stood unresolved, the Nawab renounced his styles and titles, abdicating in favour of his eldest son, Hassan Ali Mirza, on 1 November 1880. Mirza and his descendants were simply known with the title of Nawab of Murshidabad and held the status of a peerage from then on.

The nawabs of Murshidabad succeeded the nawab nazims following Nawab Mansur Ali Khan's abdication. The nawab bahadurs had ceased to exercise any significant power. They were relegated to the status of a zamindar. They continued to be a wealthy Indian family, producing bureaucrats and army officers. However, their political influence in Bengal was eclipsed by the nawab of Dhaka. In Pakistan, a member of the family, Iskander Mirza, became the country's governor-general and first president. In 1959, Wasif Ali Mirza came to be the third nawab bahadur. He was succeeded by Waris Ali Mirza who died in 1969, survived by three sons and three daughters. His death was followed by a long-standing dispute over succession as he had excluded his eldest son, Wakif Ali Mirza, from the succession for contracting a non-Muslim marriage. Waris Ali took no steps during his lifetime to establish his successor. His will stood disputed. The Indian government withdrew privileges for princely families in 1971.

== List of nawabs ==
The nawabs of Murshidabad succeeded the nawabs of Bengal. Waris Ali Mirza was the last nawab to hold the title legally. Abbas Ali Mirza has been recognised as the lawful heir of Waris Ali. The title today is de facto only and is devoid of any legal sanctity.

Picture	Name	Birth	Reign	Death
	Sayyid Ḥasan ʿAlī Mīrzā سید حسن علی میرزا সৈয়দ হাসান আলী মীর্জা	25 August 1846	17 February 1882 – 25 December 1906	25 December 1906
	Sayyid Wāṣif ʿAlī Mīrzā سید واصف علی میرزا সৈয়দ ওয়াসেফ আলী মীর্জা	7 January 1875	December 1906 – 23 October 1959	23 October 1959
	Sayyid Wāris ʿAlī Mīrzā سید وارث علی میرزا সৈয়দ ওয়ারিশ আলী মীর্জা	14 November 1901	1959 – 20 November 1969	20 November 1969
Disputed/In abeyance (20 November 1969 – 13 August 2014)
	Sayyid ʿAbbās ʿAlī Mīrzā سید عباس علی میرزا সৈয়দ আব্বাস আলী মীর্জা	circa 1942	13 August 2014 (declared lawful heir)	—N/a
