= Waris Ali Mirza =

Waris Ali Mirza Khan Bahadur
- Ihtisham ul-Mulk (Dignifier of the country); Raees ud-Daulah (Premier of the state); Amir ul-Omrah (Noble of Nobles); Mahabat Jang (Horror in War)
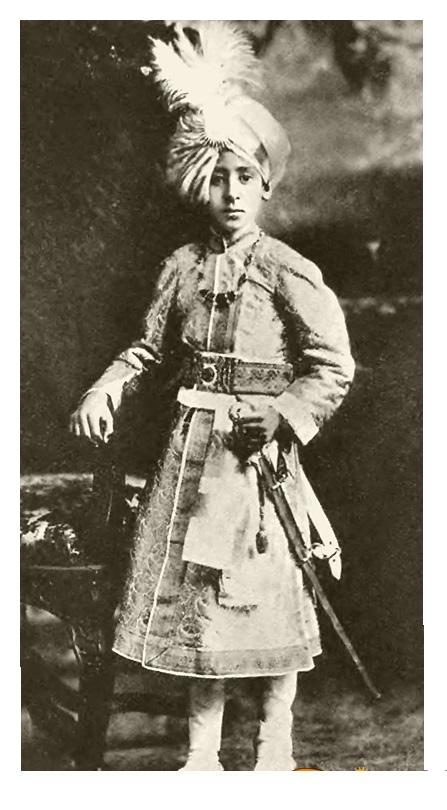
- Nawab Waris Ali Mirza Khan Bahadur of Murshidabad (in his boyhood).

Nawab Bahadur of Murshidabad
- Reign: 23 October 1959 – 20 November 1969
- Predecessor: Wasif Ali Mirza
- Successor: Position Abolished (Abbas Ali Mirza as Pretender)
- Born: 14 November 1901; Hazarduari Palace, Bengal, British India
- Died: 20 November 1969 (aged 68); Calcutta, West Bengal, India
- Spouse: See below
- Issue: See below
- Dynasty: Najafi
- Father: Wasif Ali Mirza
- Mother: Sultan Dulhan Faghfur Jahan Begum Sahiba
- Religion: Shia Islam

Sayyid Waris Ali Mirza Khan Bahadur (Bengali: ওয়ারিস আলী মির্জা; 14 November 1901 – 20 November 1969) was the last Nawab of Murshidabad before a prolonged interregnum caused by a succession dispute within the family that was only resolved in 2014 by the Indian Supreme Court. He succeeded his father, Wasif Ali Mirza.

== Biography ==
Waris Ali was born on 14 November 1901. Waris Ali ruled for ten years, from 1959 until his death on 20 November 1969 at Calcutta. Although he left three sons, there was a long interregnum following his death because of succession dispute caused by his children's disinheritance for a variety of reasons.

In August 2014 the Indian Supreme Court ruled that Mohammed Abbas Ali Mirza, a nephew of Waris Ali Mirza, was the fourth Nawab of Murshidabad in August 2014.

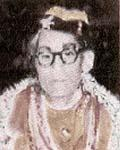
Waris Ali Mirza in his old age.

== See also ==
- List of rulers of Bengal
- Nawabs of Bengal and Murshidabad
- History of Bengal
- History of Bangladesh
- History of India

Waris Ali Mirza Born: 14 November 1901 Died: 20 November, 1969
Preceded by Wasif Ali Mirza	Nawab of Murshidabad; 1959 - 20 November 1969	Succeeded by Abbas Ali Mirza
