= Nizamat Imambara =

Shia Islam congregation hall in Murshidabad, West Bengal, India

- নিজামত ইমামবাড়া
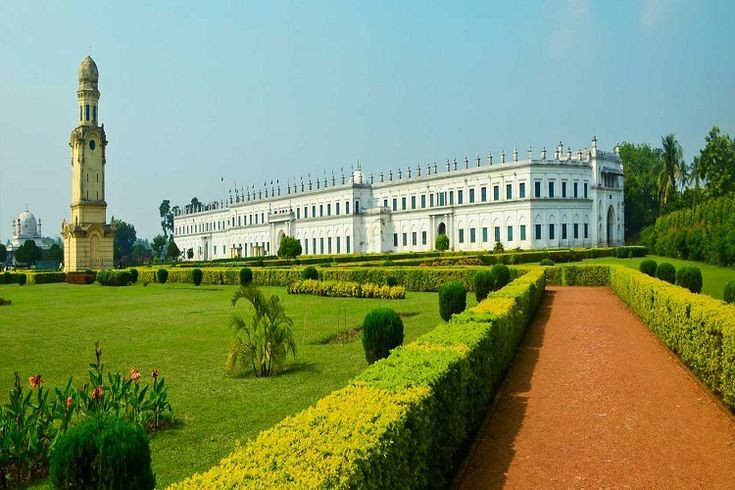
- The new imambara, opposite the Hazarduari Palace and the Bhagirathi River

- Location of the imambara in West Bengal

Religion
- Affiliation: Shia Islam
- Ecclesiastical or organisational status: Imambara
- Status: Active

Location
- Location: Murshidabad, West Bengal
- Country: India
- Coordinates: 24°11′18″N 88°16′07″E

Architecture
- Architect: Sadiq Ali Khan (1847)
- Type: Mosque architecture
- Style: Indo-Islamic
- Founder: Nawab Siraj ud-Daulah (1740); Nawab Mansur Ali Khan (1847)
- Completed: 1740 CE (1st structure); 1847 (current structure)
- Construction cost: 6 lakhs gold coins (1847)
- Destroyed: 1846 (1st structure)

Specifications
- Direction of façade: South
- Length: 210 m (680 ft) (1847)
- Dome: One (maybe more)

Monument of National Importance
- Official name: Hazarduari Palace and Imambara (Murshidabad)
- Designated: 1977
- Reference no.: N-WB-122

The Nizamat Imambara (Bengali: নিজামত ইমামবাড়া), also known as the Nizamat Kila, is a Shi'ite imambara (or congregation hall (Note: Sometimes incorrectly described as a mosque.)), located in Murshidabad, in the state of West Bengal, India.

It was built in 1740 CE by Nawab Siraj ud-Daulah and, after it was destroyed by the fires of 1842 and 1846, was rebuilt in 1847 by Nawab Mansur Ali Khan. The building is frequently mentioned as the largest imambara in the world.

Together with the Hazarduari Palace, the Imambara is a Monument of National Importance since 1977, and administered by the Archaeological Survey of India since 1985.

== Architecture ==
=== Old Imambara ===
The old Nizamat Imambara was built by Nawab Siraj ud-Daulah in the Nizamat Fort Area. He bought bricks and mortar, and laid the foundation of the building with his own hands. However, the old Imambara was primarily made up of wood. The plot where this Imambara had been built was dug to a depth of 1.8 metres (6 ft). It was refilled with soil which was brought from Karbala so that the poor members of the Muslim community could have an experience of Karbala.

The old Imambara caught fire for the first time in 1842 and was partly destroyed. It was completely destroyed by a fire on 23 December 1846. That day the Nawabs along with the Europeans threw a party to celebrate the weaning ceremony of five-year-old Hassan Ali Mirza. The Imambara caught fire at midnight due to the fireworks and was completely burnt down. Nothing survived except the old Madina Mosque.

=== New Imambara ===
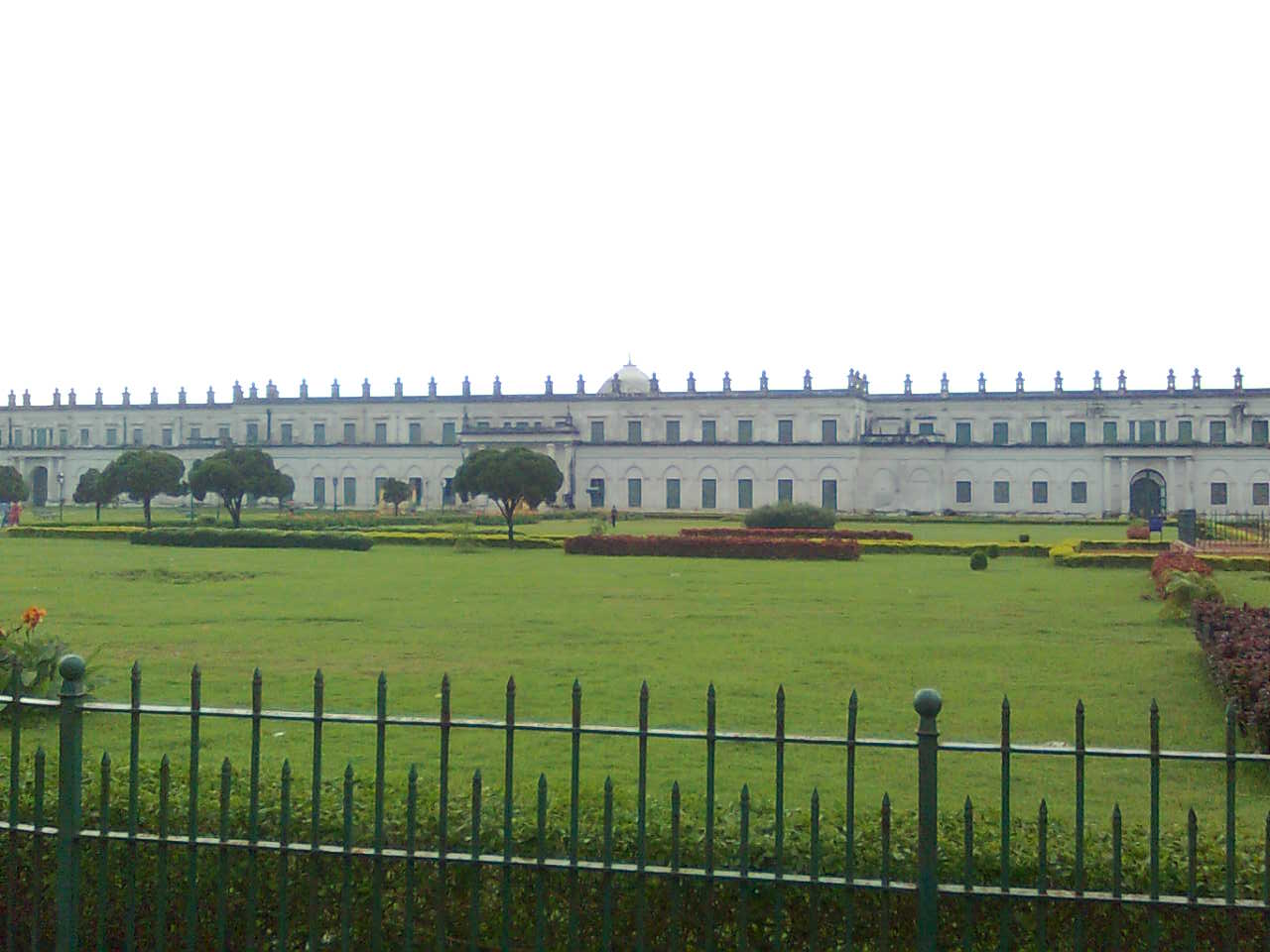
The new Nizamat Imambara

The new Imambara was built in 1847 by Nawab Nazim Mansur Ali Khan under the supervision and direction of Sadeq Ali Khan. The new mosque is located opposite the Hazarduari Palace and cost more than ₹ 6 lacs. The main entrance faces south, and is parallel to the north face of the Hazarduari Palace. The masons took eleven months to finish the construction as, in addition to their wages, they received food which allowed them to work day and night. The present Imambara is 210 metres (680 ft) long, however the width varies. The central block that has the Madina is 91 metres (300 ft) long. The new Imambara was built a metre away from the site of the old building. The gap between the shores of the river and the west wall of the Imambara are less than one metre (three point three feet).

The old Madina Mosque was left as it was and a new one was constructed in the newly constructed Imambara. The old Madina Mosque can still be seen standing between the new Imambara and the Hazarduari Palace near the Bacchawali Tope and the Clock Tower of Murshidabad.

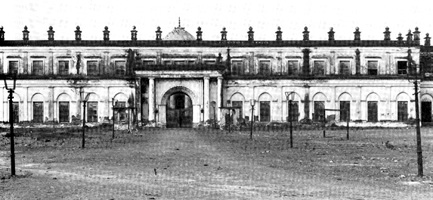
An old photo on the main entrance of the Imambara, opposite the Hazarduari Palace

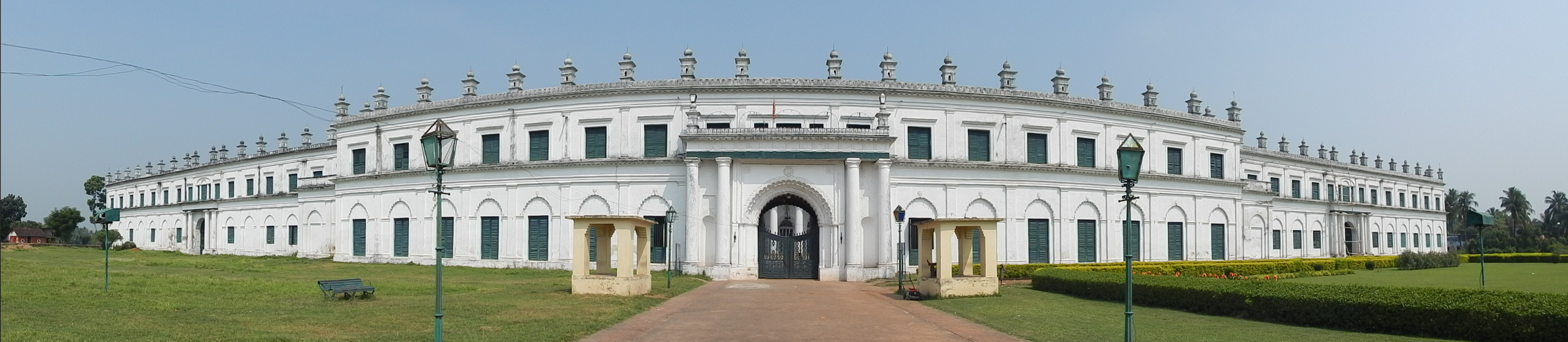
Panoramic view of the Imambara

The present Imambara has been divided into three large quadrangles as follows:

- The central quadrangle has the Madina Mosque and the Memberdalan.
- The eastern quadrangle has the Naubat Khana.
- The western quadrangle has a two-storied Mosque. The mosque stands on the Mint Ghat and rises almost from the Bhagirathi River as the distance may be a few feet.

The Memberdalan, which means hall for members, is a hall rather than a corridor just beside the Madina Mosque. It has a pulpit and to recite an elegy. The hall also has a verandah. The hall, the verandah and its flooring, are all built with marble. The hall also has a spacious room for the ladies. The vat between this hall and the mosque had silver headed fountains. They worked after the singing of the elegies were over.

The entrance of the Naubat Khana is a huge gate built in Imamia style which is surrounded by this Naubat Khana.

The western quadrangle of the Imambara has a two storied mosque which stands on the Mint Ghat. It has stately pillars and spacious marble floors. The mosque has several magnificent chandeliers, most of them gifted to the Nawabs by the East India Company and several other magnificent equipments.

== Gallery ==
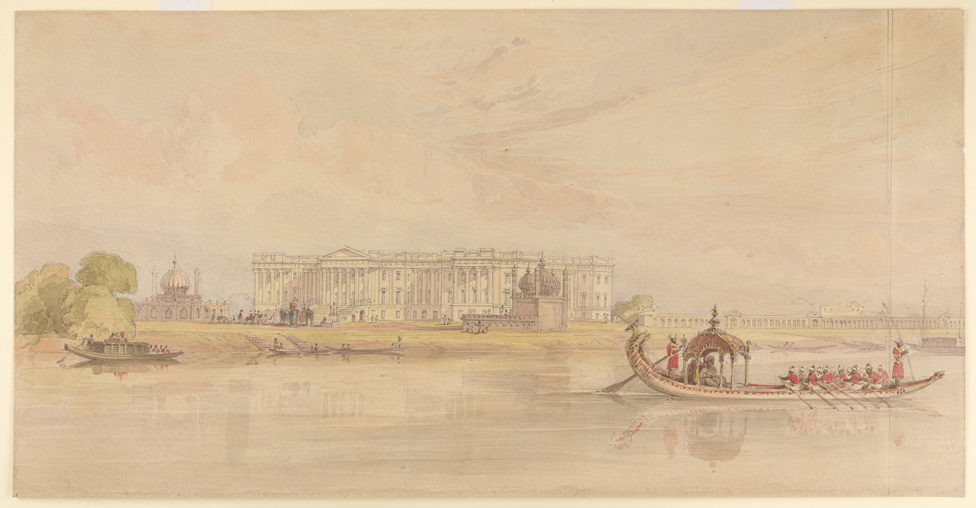
A painting by William Prinsep of the Nizamat Fort Campus with the old Imambara at extreme right just behind the boat and the other surrounding buildings which include the Hazarduari Palace.

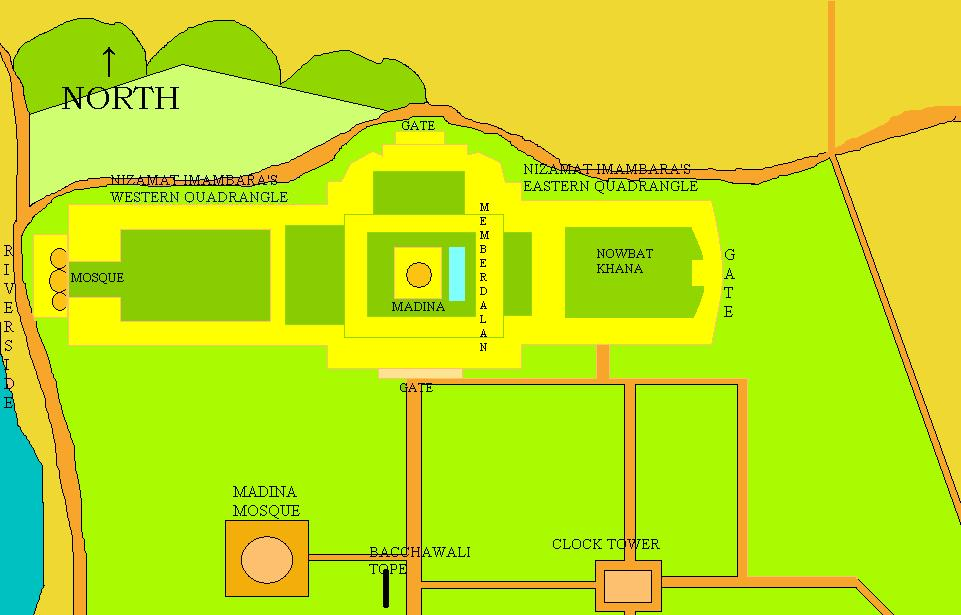
Map of Nizamat Fort Campus showing the Imambara in yellow

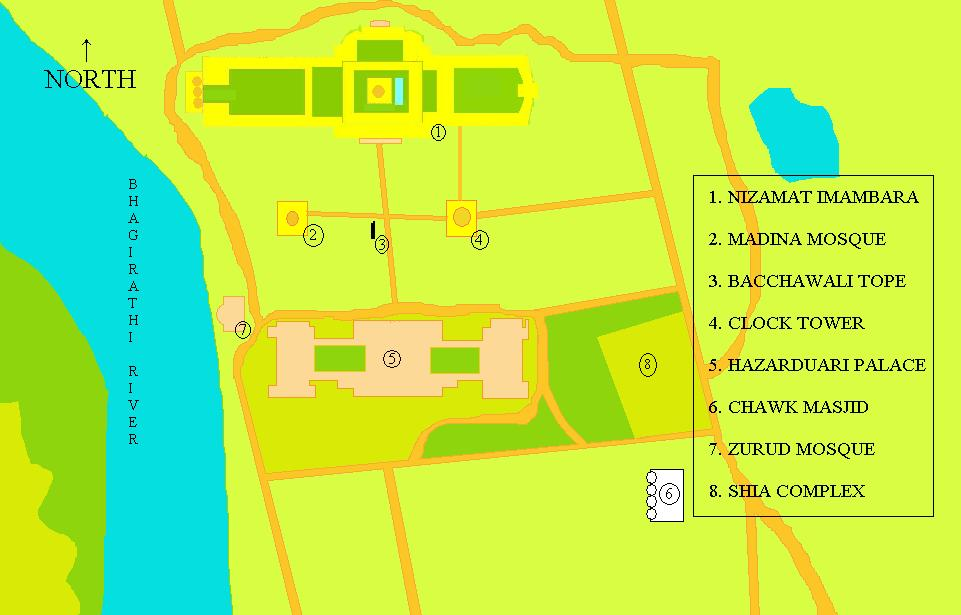
Map of Nizamat Fort Campus showing the Imambara in yellow and other buildings surrounding it, including the Madina Mosque, the Hazarduari Palace, Chawk Masjid, Bacchawali Tope, the clock tower, Shia complex, and the Zurud Mosque (north).

== See also ==
- List of mosques in India
- List of Monuments of National Importance in West Bengal
- Shia Islam in India
