= Madina Mosque (Bengal) =

Mosque in Murshidabad, West Bengal, India

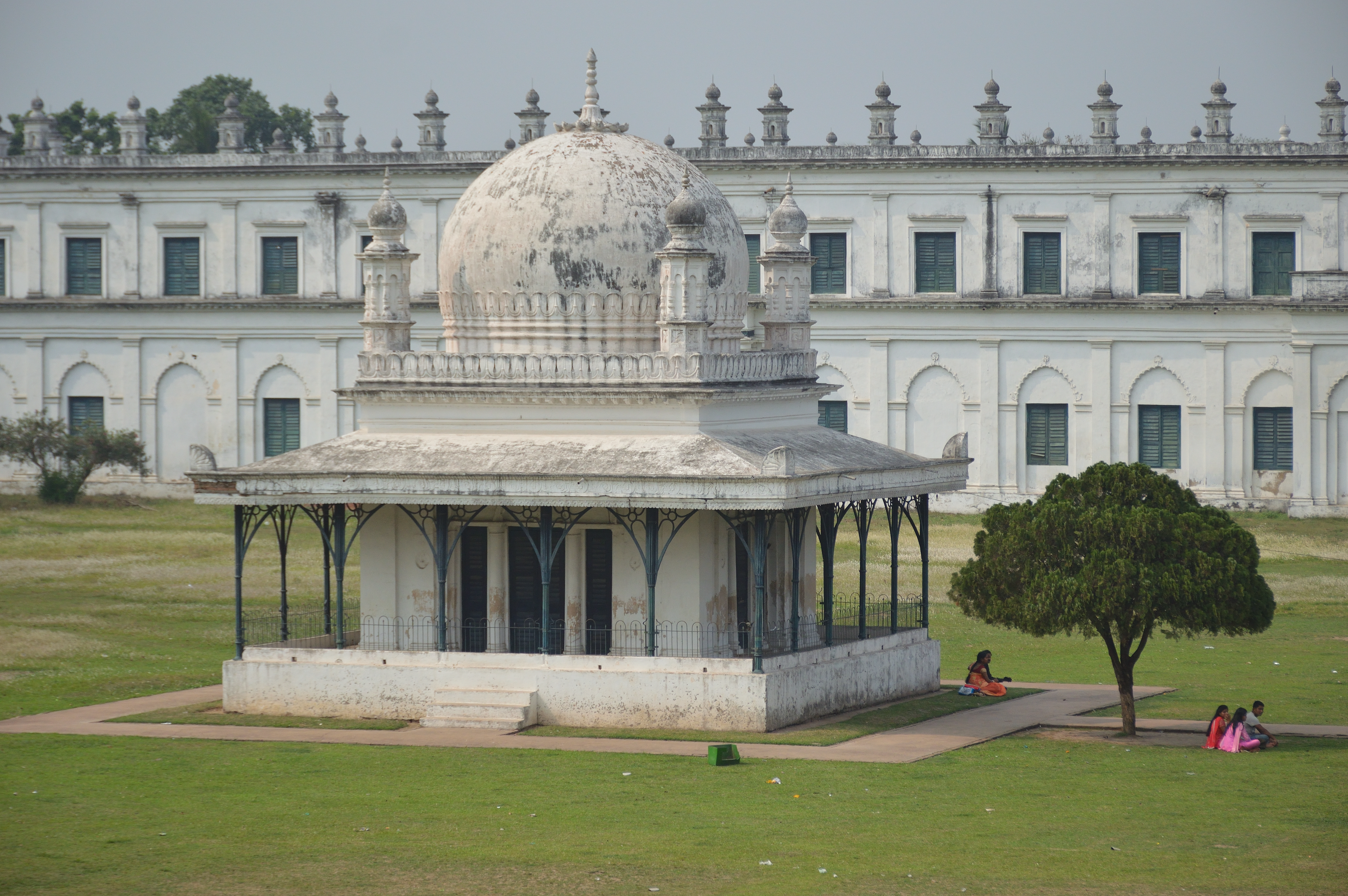
- The old Madina Mosque, in 2017

- Location of the two mosques in West Bengal

Religion
- Affiliation: Islam
- Ecclesiastical or organisational status: Mosque
- Status: Active

Location
- Location: Hazarduari Palace complex, Murshidabad, West Bengal
- Country: India
- Administration: Archaeological Survey of India
- Coordinates: 24°11′15″N 88°16′06″E

Architecture
- Type: Mosque architecture
- Style: Indo-Islamic
- Founder: Nawab Siraj ud-Daulah (Old); Nawab Mansur Ali Khan (New)
- Completed: 18th century (Old); 1847 (New)
- Domes: One (each, both old and new)

Monument of National Importance
- Official name: Old Madina Mosque
- Part of: Hazarduari Palace and Imambara (Murshidabad)
- Reference no.: N-WB-122

The Madina Mosque are two mosques, located in the Nizamat Fort Campus in Murshidabad, in the state of West Bengal, India. The two mosques on the fort campus are the old Madina Mosque, built by Nawab Siraj ud-Daulah during the 18th century, and the new Madina Mosque, built by Nawab Mansur Ali Khan in 1847.

The old mosque was completely burnt during 1846. Nawab Mansur Ali Khan built the present Nizamat Imambara in 1847.

== Architecture ==
The old mosque was constructed by Nawab Siraj ud-Daulah. It remained until a 1846 fire.

The present Nizamat Imambara was constructed in 1847 under the supervision of Sadeq Ali Khan. The new Madina Mosque is located within the grounds of the new Nizamat Imambara.

== Gallery ==
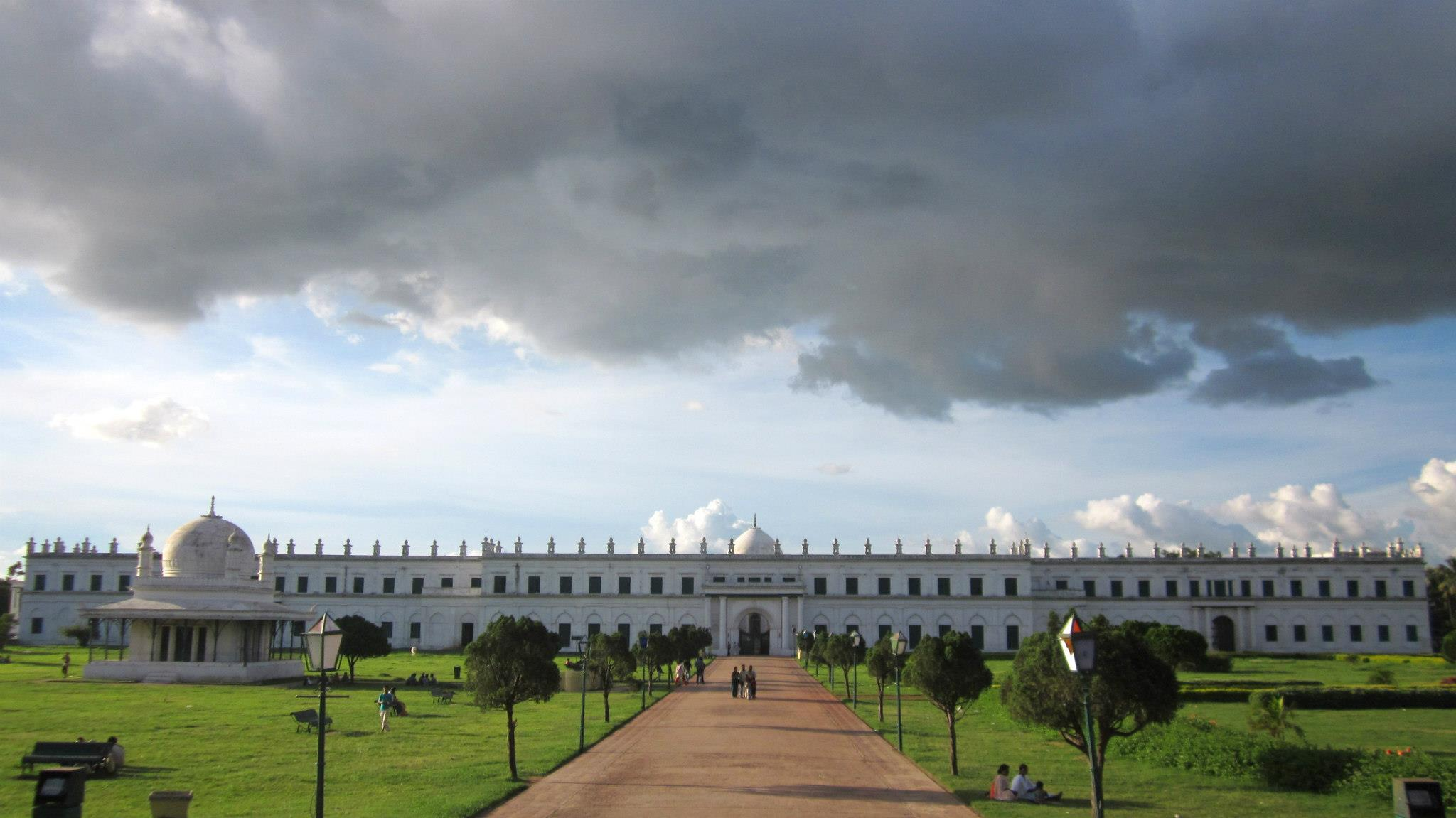
The Nizamat Imambara with the dome of the new Madina Mosque in the background. The old Madina Mosque is in the foreground, on the left.

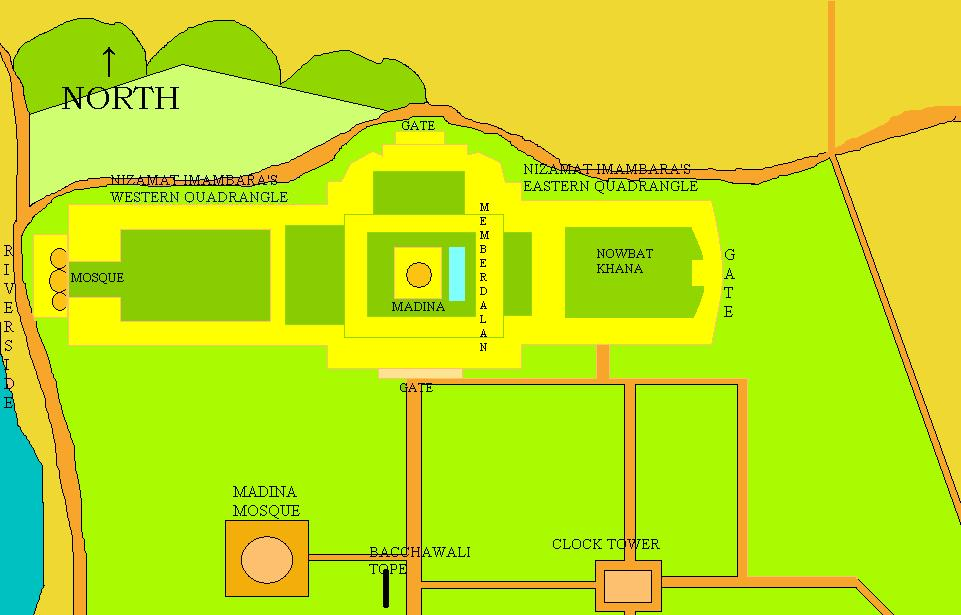
A map of the Nizamat Fort Campus, showing the Nizamat Imambara in yellow and the buildings inside it, including the new Madina Mosque

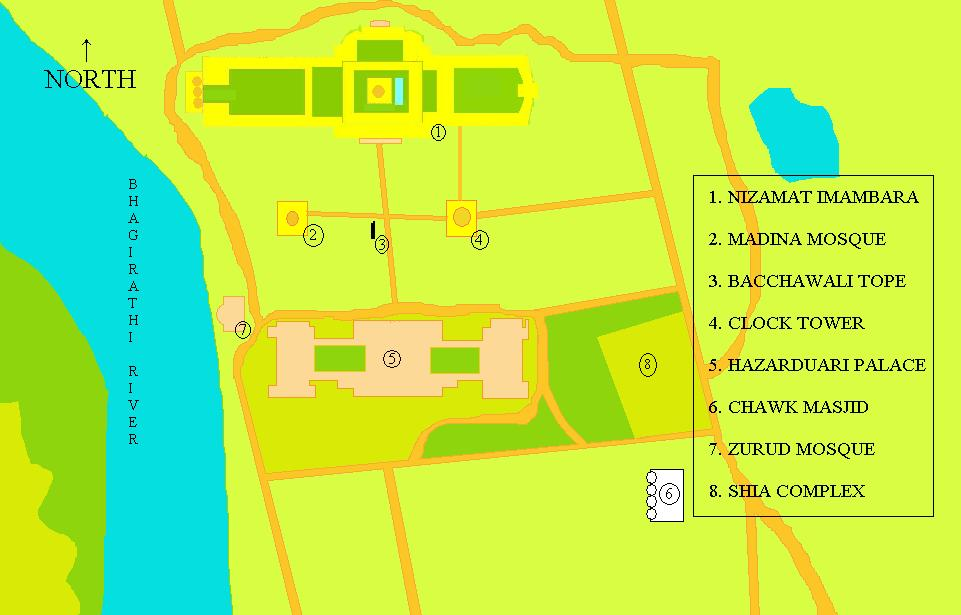
A map of the Nizamat Fort Campus, showing the Nizamat Imambara in yellow and other buildings, including the old Madina Mosque

== See also ==
- Islam in India
- List of mosques in India
- List of Monuments of National Importance in West Bengal
