= Hassan Ali Mirza =

First Nawab of Murshidabad

- Ali Kadir (Of First Rank); Ihtisham-ul-Mulk, Rais-ud-Daula, Amir-ul-Umara, Mahabat Jang
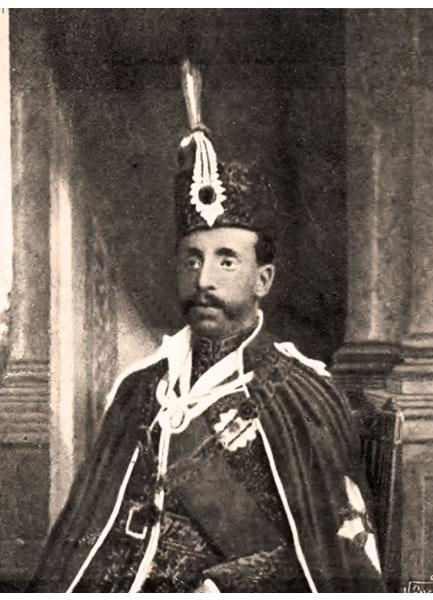
- Hassan Ali Mirza wearing the mantle of the Most Eminent Order of the Indian Empire

Nawab Bahadur of Murshidabad
- Reign: 17 February 1882 - 25 December 1906
- Coronation: 27 March 1883
- Predecessor: Mansur Ali Khan (as Nawab of Bengal & Bihar)
- Successor: Wasif Ali Mirza
- Born: 25 August 1846; Hazarduari Palace, Bengal, British India
- Died: 25 December 1906 (aged 60); Baghdad, Baghdad Vilayet, Ottoman Empire
- Burial: Iraq
- Spouse: Amir Dulhan Kulsum un-Nisa Begum; Mariam un-Nisa Khanum
- Issue: See below
Names
- Sayyid Hassan Ali Mirza
- Bengali: হাসান আলী মির্জা
- House: Najafi
- Father: Mansur Ali Khan
- Mother: Mehr Lekha Begum
- Religion: Shia Islam

Nawab Sir Sayyid Hassan Ali Mirza Khan Bahadur GCIE (Bengali: হাসান আলী মির্জা; 25 August 1846 – 25 December 1906) was the eldest son of Mansur Ali Khan, the last Nawab of Bengal. He succeeded his father, Mansur Ali Khan, as the first Nawab Bahadur of Murshidabad as the title of Nawab Nazim of Bengal was abolished in 1880. His installation ceremony was performed in the Throne Room of Hazarduari Palace on 27 March 1883 by Sir Rivers Thompson, the Lieutenant-Governor of Bengal. The sanad conferring the hereditary title of Nawab Bahadur of Murshidabad was however dated 17 February 1882. At his death in 1906, he was succeeded by his son, Wasif Ali Mirza.

== Early life and education ==
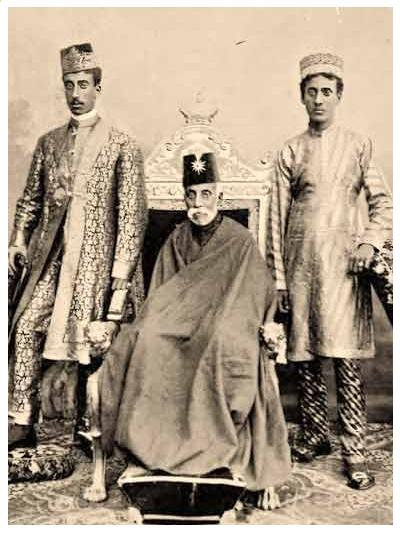
Hassan Ali (middle), and two of his sons- Wasif Ali (left) and Nasir Ali (right).

His mother, Mehr Lekha Begum, was the second wife of his father, and was of Habshi descent. He was educated at La Martiniere College in Lucknow.

== Honours ==
- Knight Grand Commander of the Order of the Indian Empire (GCIE)-1890 (KCIE-1887)

== See also ==
- List of rulers of Bengal
- Nawabs of Bengal and Murshidabad
- History of Bengal
- History of Bangladesh
- History of India

Hassan Ali Mirza Born: 25 August 1846 Died: 25 December, 1906
Preceded by Mansur Ali Khan as Nawab of Bengal	Nawab of Murshidabad; 17 February 1882 - 25 December 1906	Succeeded by Wasif Ali Mirza Khan
