= Wasif Manzil =

- Wasif Manzil
- Interactive map of the Wasif Manzil area
- Alternative names: New Palace

General information
- Location: West Bengal, Murshidabad, India
- Coordinates: 24.182663°N 88.269492°E
- Completed: Present building was completed in 1904 after the earthquake.
- Renovated: After an earthquake in 1897
- Destroyed: 1897 earthquake

Design and construction
- Architects: Mr. Vivian, officer of the Public Works Department of the Nadia Rivers Division; Surendra Barat, engineer

Website
- "Website URL". Archived from the original on 8 January 2019.

Wasif Manzil (also known as Wasef Manzil or New Palace) is a palace in Murshidabad, West Bengal, India. It was built by Nawab Wasif Ali Mirza Khan under the direction and supervision of Mr. Vivian, officer of the Public Works Department of the Nadia Rivers Division, and Surendra Barat, a Bengali engineer. This building, located on the Nizamat Fort Campus close to the Hazarduari Palace, was used by the Nawab as his residence.

== History ==
The palace was extensively destroyed in an earthquake on 12 June 1897. The palace's entire second floor collapsed within a few seconds. The building was later repaired but without the second floor.

The palace is now maintained by the Archaeological Survey of India and has been converted into a museum. The palace has a garden space in front of it with a fountain and several marble statues, enclosed with an iron railing. The main entrance is a Norman archway with open-work iron doors. The staircases and statues inside the palace are made of marble.

== Wasif Manzil picture gallery ==
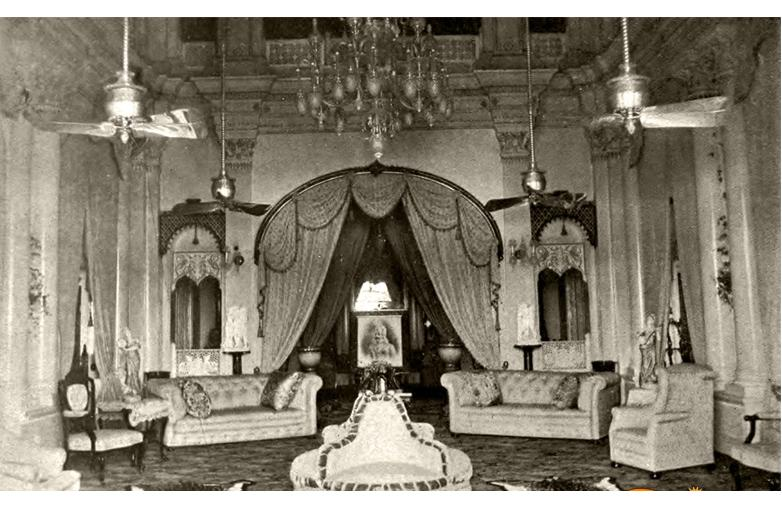
An old photo of the Wasif Manzil's drawing room with Nawab Wasif Ali Mirza Khan's picture at the back.

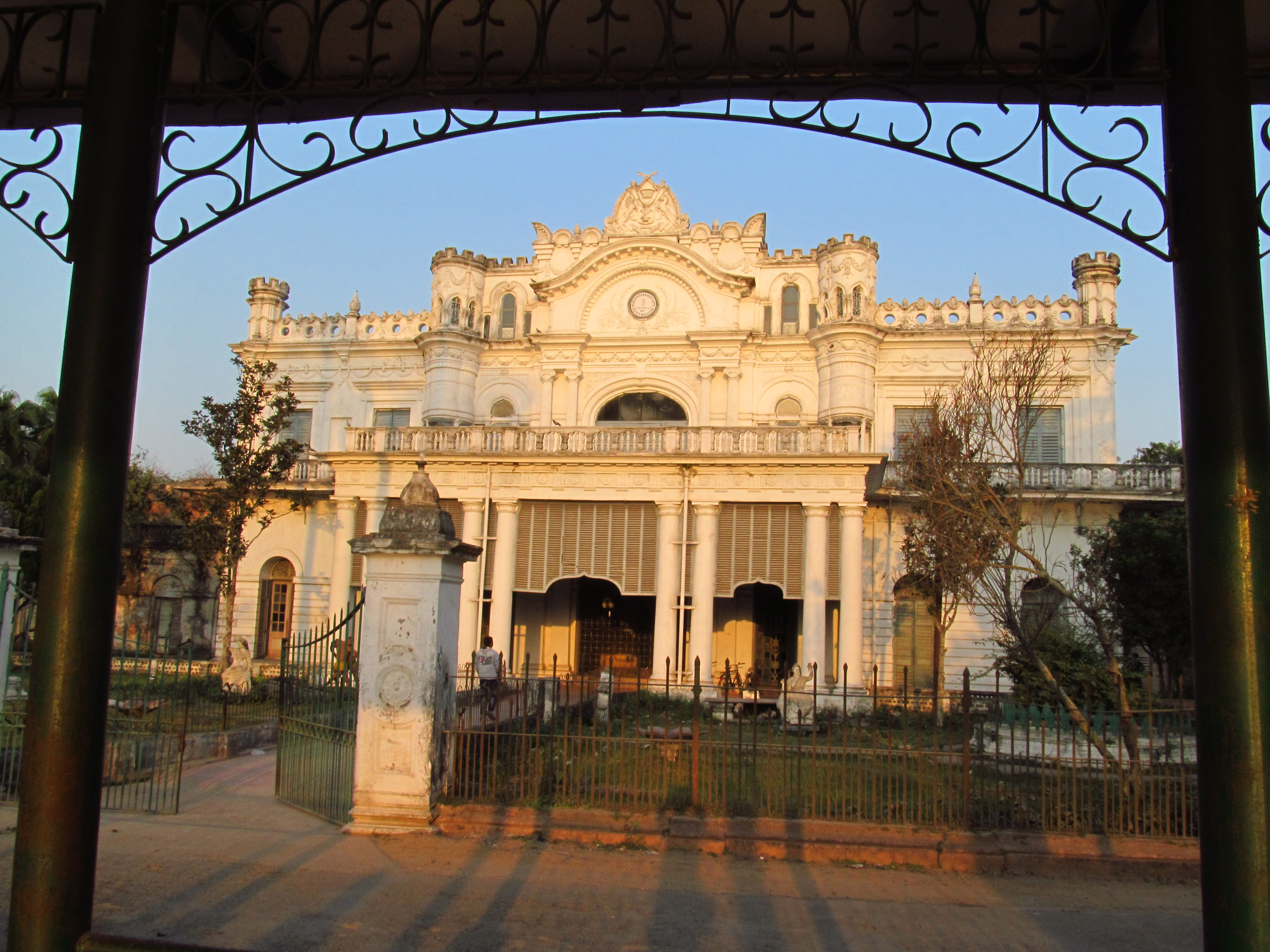
Wasif Manzil

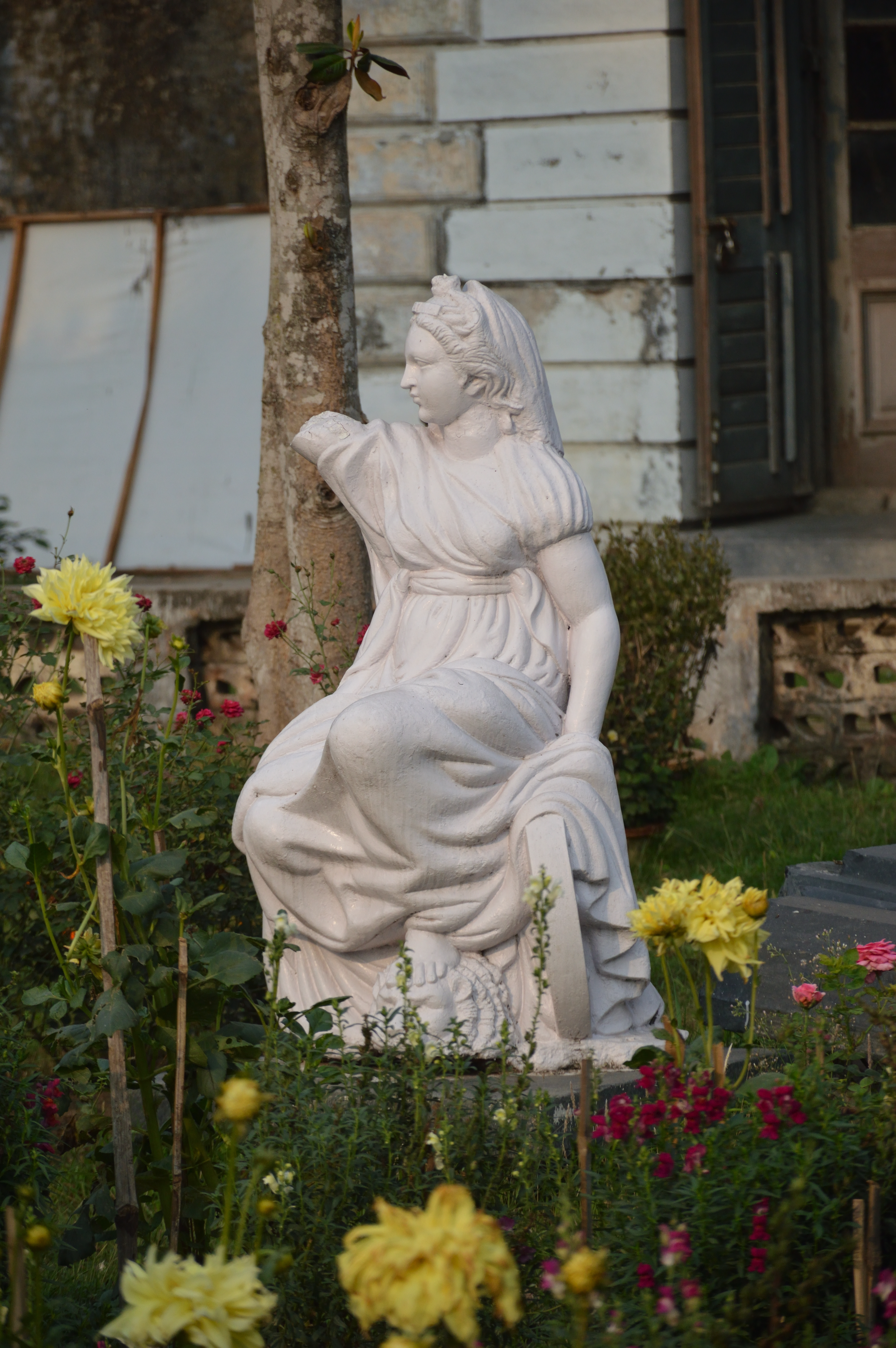
Statue

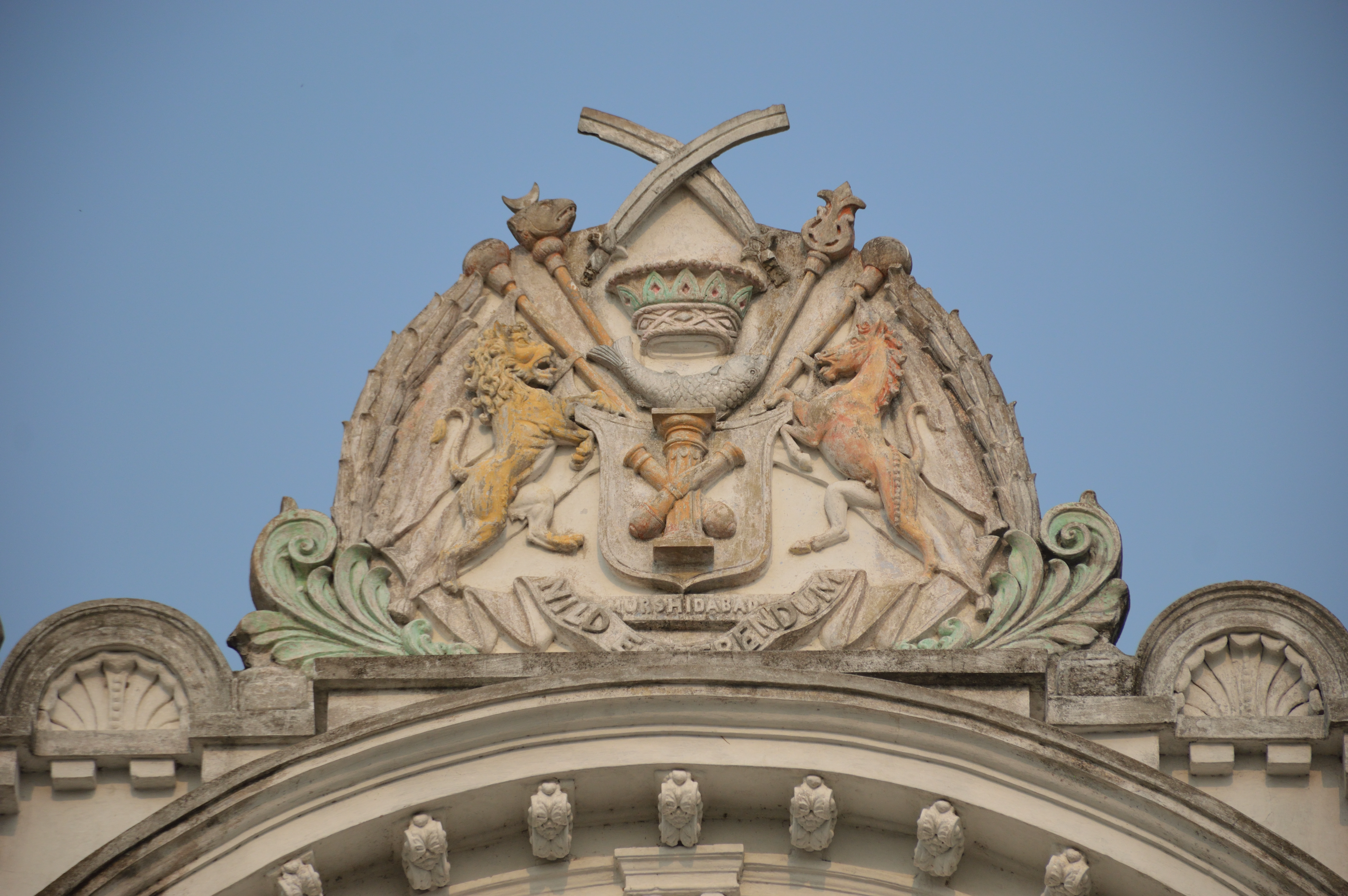
Coat of Arms - stucco decoration

Wasif Manzil

== See also ==
- Chawk Masjid
- Nizamat Imambara
