= Wasif Ali Mirza =

Wasif Ali Mirza Khan Bahadur
- Ihtisham ul-Mulk (Dignifier of the country); Raes ud-Daulah (Premier of the state); Amir ul-Omrah (Noble of Nobles); Mahabat Jang (Horror in War)
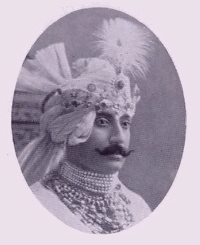

Nawab Bahadur of Murshidabad
- Reign: December 1906 – 23 October 1959
- Predecessor: Hassan Ali Mirza
- Successor: Waris Ali Mirza
- Born: 7 January 1875; Hazarduari Palace, Bengal, British India
- Died: 23 October 1959 (aged 84); Calcutta, West Bengal, India
- Burial: Jafarganj, West Bengal, India
- Spouse: See below
- Issue: See below
Names
- Wasif Ali Mirza
- Dynasty: Najafi
- Father: Hassan Ali Mirza
- Mother: Amir Dulhan Kulsum-un-nisa Begum
- Religion: Shia Islam
