= Mansur Ali Khan =

Nawab of Bengal from 1838 to 1880

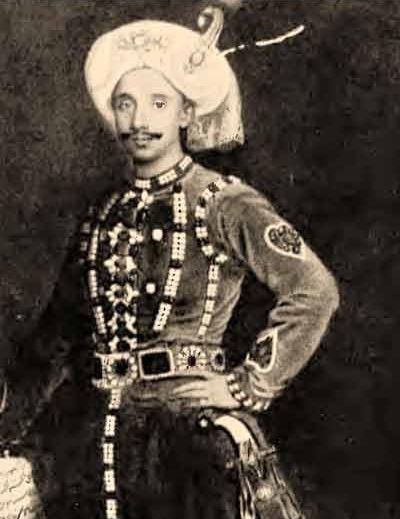

Nawab Nazim of Bengal and Bihar
- Reign: 30 October 1838 – 1 November 1880
- Predecessor: Mubarak Ali Khan II,
- Successor: Hassan Ali Mirza (as Nawab of Murshidabad)
- Born: 30 October 1830; Murshidabad, Bengal, British India
- Died: 4 November 1884 (aged 54); Hazarduari Palace, Bengal, British India
- Wives: Shams i Jehan Begum; Malika Zamani; Shah-un nisa; Sarah Vennell (English woman); Julia Lewis (English woman); Sambar-un-Nesa Begum (Bi Sambaran)
- Issue: 39 children - 19 sons and 20 daughters survived him
Names
- Mansur Ali Khan
- Dynasty: Najafi
- Religion: Shia Islam

Nawab Sayyid Mansur Ali Khan (30 October 1830 – 4 November 1884) was the Nawab of Bengal from 1838 until his abdication in 1880, whereupon he renounced his titles and position as Nawab. During his reign, he instituted various policies in the princely state he governed, frequently coming into conflict with the colonial government over monetary issues. Khan was a frequent visitor to Britain, and it was there that he often pleaded his case in regard to disputes with the colonial government. In 1880, Khan decided to abdicate in favour of his eldest son. He died four years later.

== Life ==
=== Early years ===
Nawab Nazim Mansur Ali Khan was born to Nawab Mubarak Ali Khan II and Rais-un-nisa Begum on 29 October 1830. He was only eight years old when he succeeded his father on 29 October 1838, which happened to be the day of Eid ul-Fitr. He received the titles of Muntizam-ul-Mulk (Ruler of the Country), Mohsen ud-Daulah (Benefactor of the State), Feradun Jah (Of High Rank) and Nasrut jang (Helper in War). However, he was popularly known as Nawab Nazim Feradun Jah or Janab-e-Ali. Later, he was abdicated and received the lesser title of Nawab Bahadur and was denied the use of the qualification of His Highness.

=== Reign as Nawab ===
After Mansur Ali Khan succeeded his father, Mubarak Ali Khan II, on 29 October 1838 at the age of eight years to become the Nawab of Bengal, with Kishvar Khan as his Wazir and Khwaja Fazal Mohammed as the chief Qazi.

Mr W. H. Elliot, appointed agent to the Governor General in December 1838, relinquished charge of the Nizamat affairs in February 1839 and the care of the boy Nawab passed into the hands of Colonel Caulfield. During the period from January 1840 to December 1846, there were many changes, three agents being appointed and relieved. The affairs of the Nawab's family were disordered and what disappointed them more was when Mr Torrens appointed a lot of agents to the Governor General on 17 December 1846.

The Nawab was unable to take part in the management of his affairs as he was very young and was surrounded by intriguers whose only idea was that of self-interest. Mr Torrens was absent from April 1851 to December 1851, and he died on 15 August 1852. When the Nawab grew up, he began to inquire into matters and found that there was confusion in all departments. The main things which were needed was the accounting of money and friendly cooperation between the native officials and the European agents and their officers. The government found it necessary to appropriate the certain so-called Nizamat Funds and made new arrangements with regard to the Nawab's stipend. But, the Nawab wanted full explanation and resented what, for want of full information, he regarded it as acts of injustice.

The Nawab slowly started taking active interests in matters and found much to complain of, which made certain inquiries during the year 1852. Of ₹ 16 lacs assigned to him by the East India Company his personal allotment was ₹ 7,50,000 lacs only. The remainder was used for the other members of the family and any unexpected balance was transferred to the Nizamat Deposit Fund, which later became the subject of a great controversy.

Nawab Nazim Mansur Ali Khan, better known as Feradun Jah, founded the Nizamat School and College or the Nawab Bahadur's institution, which is also known as the Nawab's High School and the Nawab's Madrassa. The Nawab's High School or the Nawab Bahadur's Institution was set up in 1825 exclusively for the son and akrobas of the Nawab. He also rebuilt the present building of Nizamat Imambara after the fire of 23 December 1846, just parallel to the north face of the Hazarduari Palace, at a cost of more than ₹ 6 lacs during those times.

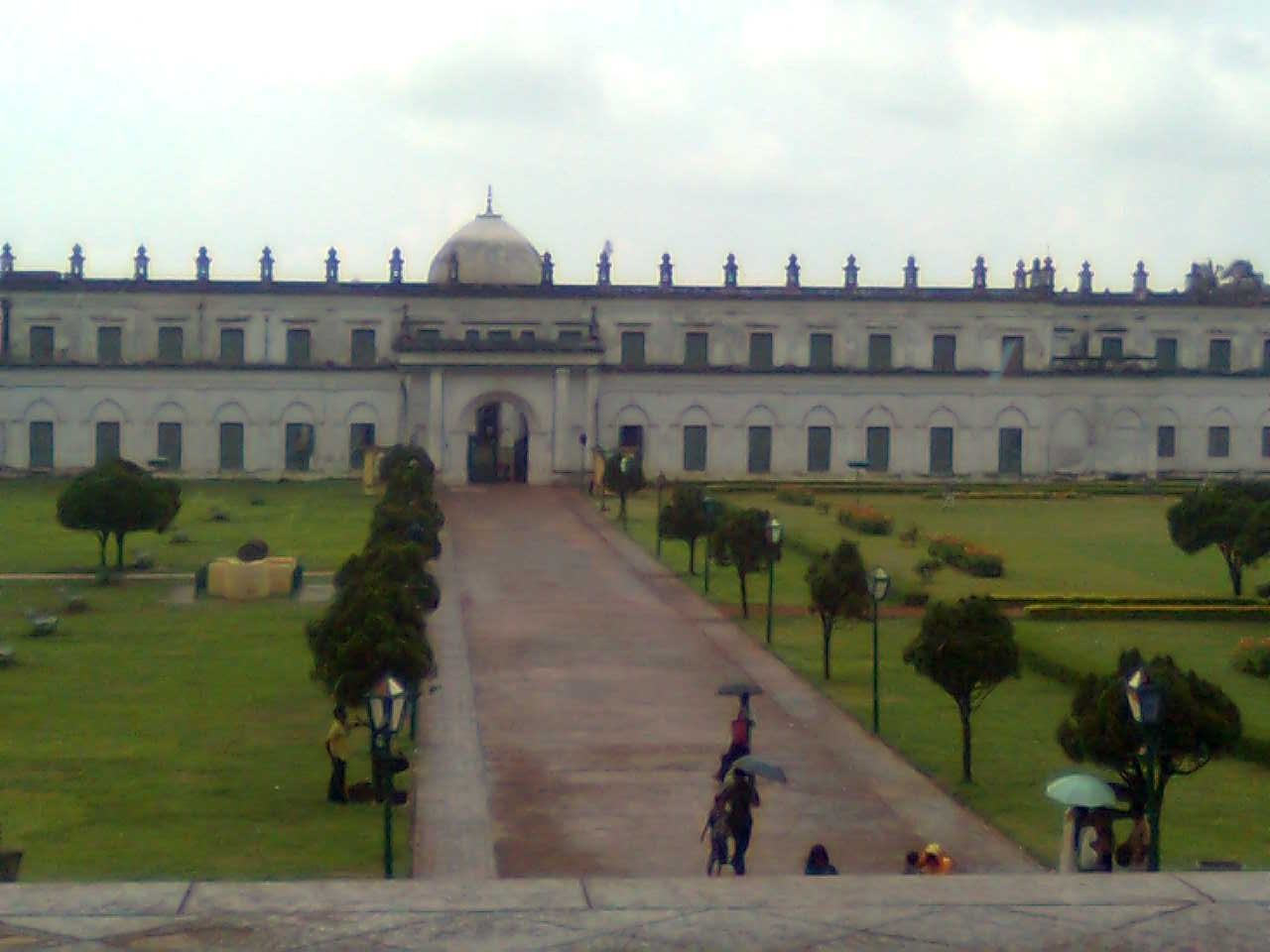
The south face of the Nizamat Imambara as seen from the stairs of the Hazarduari Palace.

In 1853, it was declared that the Nawab had no treaty rights. This was followed in 1854 by the abolition of all the former privileges of the Nazim. The Nawab's salute of nineteen guards was reduced to thirteen for alleged complicity in the murder of two menials on 11 October 1854 in the Nawab's shooting camp. The Nawab's attendant Aman Ali Khan, the principal eunuch, was prosecuted for having done the murder. All the eunuchs were acquitted by the Supreme Court and later they were received back to the Nawab's service but the government ordered their peremptory dismissal.

In the same year (i.e. 1853) the four regulations and Acts of 1799, 1805, 1806 and 1822 securing to him certain privileges were repealed and the Nazim's right of control over the Nizamate Fund Deposit was denied. After the Revolt of 1857, in which Nawab Nazim Feradun Jah had rendered material assistance the salute of nineteen guard was restored. In 1860, Nawab Nazim Feradun Jah memorialized the Secretary of State for India in council about his numerous grievances. Receiving no redress, the Nawab went to England in 1869 against the advice of his dewan, Raja Prasanna Narayan Deb, accompanied by his private secretary and chief counsellor, Mr H. C. Fox, to prefer his complaint in person to Her Majesty's Government. His grievances were ventilated in Parliament but with little success.

By the time the Nawab was in England, the Nizamate at Murshidabad became involved in debts and people started making several claims against the Nawab Nazim. Thus, as a result attachments were issued against his property. The Government of India there upon moved into an action of freezing the Nawab and his property from suits and attachments and also of discharging portions of the claims. With the further object of exempting him from the jurisdiction of the Civil Courts, the Government of India passed an Act (XVII of 1873) in 1873 and appointed there under a commission for the purpose of carrying out the objects of the enactment. On 13 December 1875 the commissioners, one of whom was Beaufort, formerly judge of Murshidabad, submitted their declaration with regard to the Nizamat State Property (that is property held by the Government of India for the purpose of upholding the dignity of the Nawab Nazim of Bengal for the time being). In April 1876 the Nizamate commissioners completed and made their awards with respect to the claims of several creditors.

=== Abolition of the title ===
It was in 1880 that the title of "Nawab of Bengal" was abolished. When Feradun Jah was in England he entered into a contract with the Secretary of State. In the contract he agreed to receive a sum of (Indian Rupees) 10 lakhs. It was to paid out of his arrears of pension, in full satisfaction of his personal claims. The personal claims were to one of his own and whatsoever he wanted. The Nawab also expressed a desire to retire from the Nizamate and his personal stipend of 10,000 pounds sterling per annum was granted to him, with an option to reside wherever he pleased.

=== Abdication ===
Feradun Jah left Murshidabad in February 1869 and started living in England. He remained there until his return at Bombay in October 1881. However, his journey was not much of pleasure as most of his time was spent in pleading his case against orders of the Government of India. At last after it was not resolved the Nawab renounced his styles and titles of Nawab Nazim of Bengal and Bihar and abdicated in favour of his eldest son, at St. Ives, Maidenhead, on 1 November 1880. As he was prone to pleasure and extravaganza he fell deeply into debts and was obliged to dispose much of his family jewels, property and patrimony in return for a life pension of £10,000 per annum, a personal stipend of £83,000 and expenses of £25,000.

=== Death and legacy ===
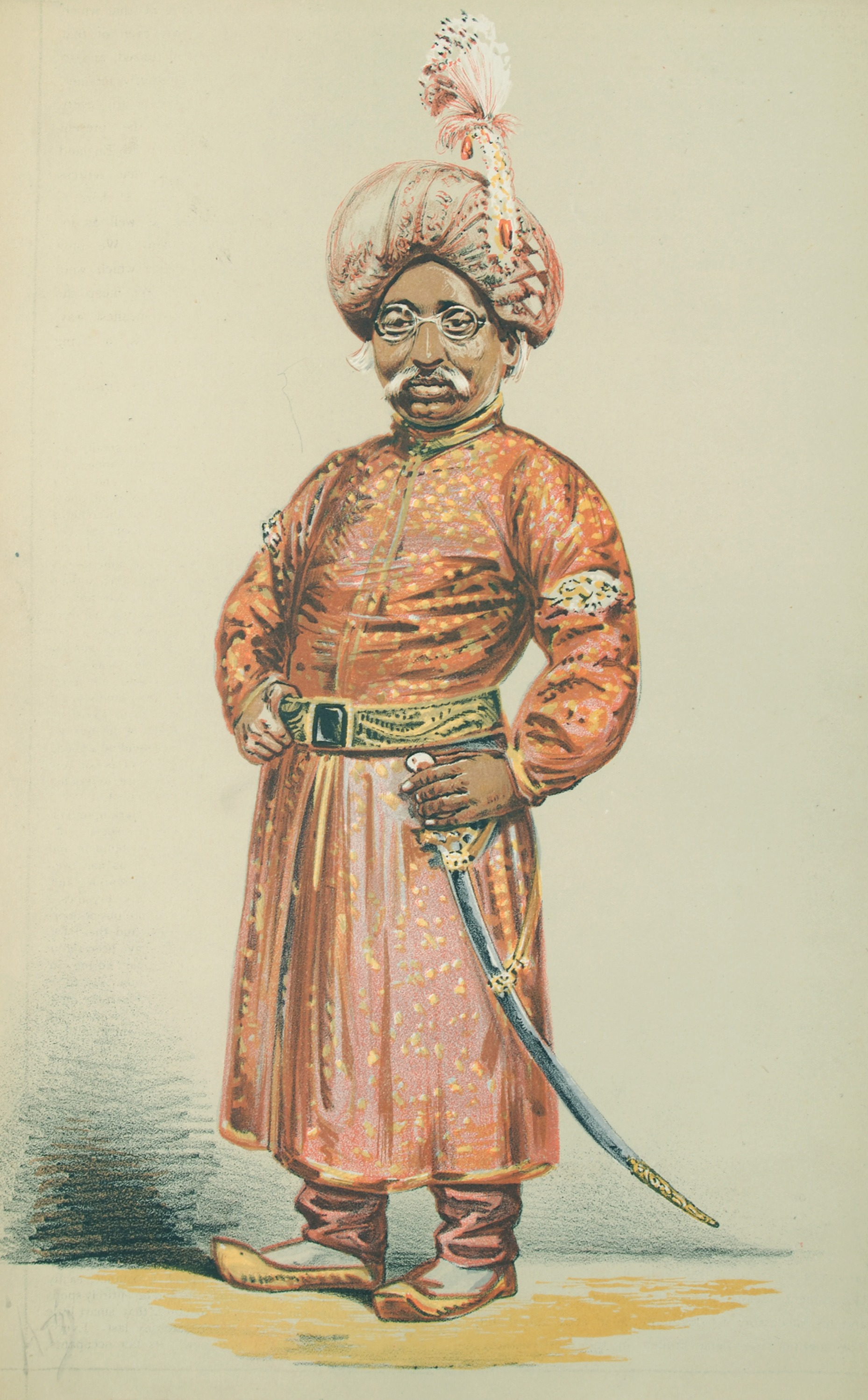
Nawab Nazim Feradun Jah in his old age.

Feradun Jah came back to Murshidabad where he died of cholera at the Hazarduari Palace on 5 November 1884 and was buried in the family cemetery at Jafarganj Cemetery. The place where he was buried in coincidence was the only available space left in the line of the tombs of the Nazims, and were subsequently removed for interment at Karbala in Iraq, in pursuance of his will.. He was succeeded by his eldest son, Nawab Sayyid Hassan Ali Mirza Khan Bahadur as Nawab of Murshidabad. His great-grandson, Iskander Mirza (through his son Bahadur Syed Iskander Ali and his grandson Mohammad Fateh Ali), became the first president of Pakistan in 1956. His 22nd son was Sahibzada Syed Jafar Meerza Bahadur, whose grandson was Syed Safder Meerza (Bacchu Sir), from his son Syed Haider Meerza (Piare Sahib). Syed Safder Meerza went on to become the chief ata'lliq of Nawab Bahadur's Institution, Murshidabad (ata'lliq - mentor).

=== Marriage ===
==== Principal wives ====
Mansur Ali Khan had in all six principal wives:

1. Shams-i-Jehan Begum Sahiba (H.H. Firadaus Mahal; née Mehar-un-nisa Begum Sahiba). Married Nawab Mansur Ali Khan in Murshidabad. She was a Gaddinashin Begum and died at Calcutta on 21 April 1905.
2. Malika-uz Zamani Begum Sahiba (Hazziya Begum). She died at Murshidabad in November 1884.
3. Mehr Lekha Begum Sahiba (Guiti Afroz Mahal). She died at Murshidabad on 30 May 1855, she has been buried at the Jafarganj Cemetery. She was previously a mut'ah wife as Hasina Khanum, a former Abyssinian slave girl.
4. Shah-un nisa Begum Sahiba. She died at Murshidabad on 16 January 1892. She was previously a mut‘ah wife of as Shah-un-nisa Khanum and had been buried at the Jafarganj Cemetery.
5. Shams-un-nisa Begum Sahiba. She died before 1865. She too was previously a mut‘ah wife of as Shams-un-nisa Khanum.
6. Sarah Begum Sahiba (before marriage she was an English woman and was named Sarah Vennell). Their marriage took place at the Alexandra Hotel, St. George's Place in London on 15 May 1870. She was born in 1853 and died on 1 September 1925 at London. She was a daughter of Josiah Godfrey Vennell, of New Barnet, Middlesex. Sarah's brother was George Alexander Vennell who was a barrister of law and represented Mansur Ali Khan in a number of his legal dealings while in England.

==== Mut'ah wives ====
1. Faiz-un-nisa Khanum
2. Mubaraq Khadam (previously Bi Moti)
3. Badr-un-nisa Khanum
4. Zeb-un-nisa Khanum
5. Nazam-un-nisa Khanum
6. Muhammadi Begum (an English woman known as Julia Lewis before marriage). Their marriage took place at London. She was a daughter of Thomas Lewis and died at Patcham, Sussex, on 20 December 1948.
7. Sambar-un-nisa Begum (previously Bi Sambaran) = Mother of Sahibzada Sayyid Ja'afar Mirza Bahadur. born at Hazardowari Palace, Murshidabad, 12 March 1866. married (first) Jamshid Dulhan Hashmat Zohra Begum Sahiba. m. (i) Imami Khanum (d. after 1899), previously Ummat un-nisa. married (ii) Ghasiti Khanum (d. after 1899). He died 6 December 1896, having had issue, three sons and one daughter.

== See also ==
- List of rulers of Bengal
- History of Bengal
- History of Bangladesh
- History of India

Preceded by Mubarak Ali Khan II	Nawab of Bengal; 1838–1880	Succeeded by Ali Mirza Khan as Nawab of Murshidabad
