= Hazarduari Palace =

Former palace, now monument and museum, in Murshidabad, West Bengal, India

- হাজারদুয়ারী প্রাসাদ
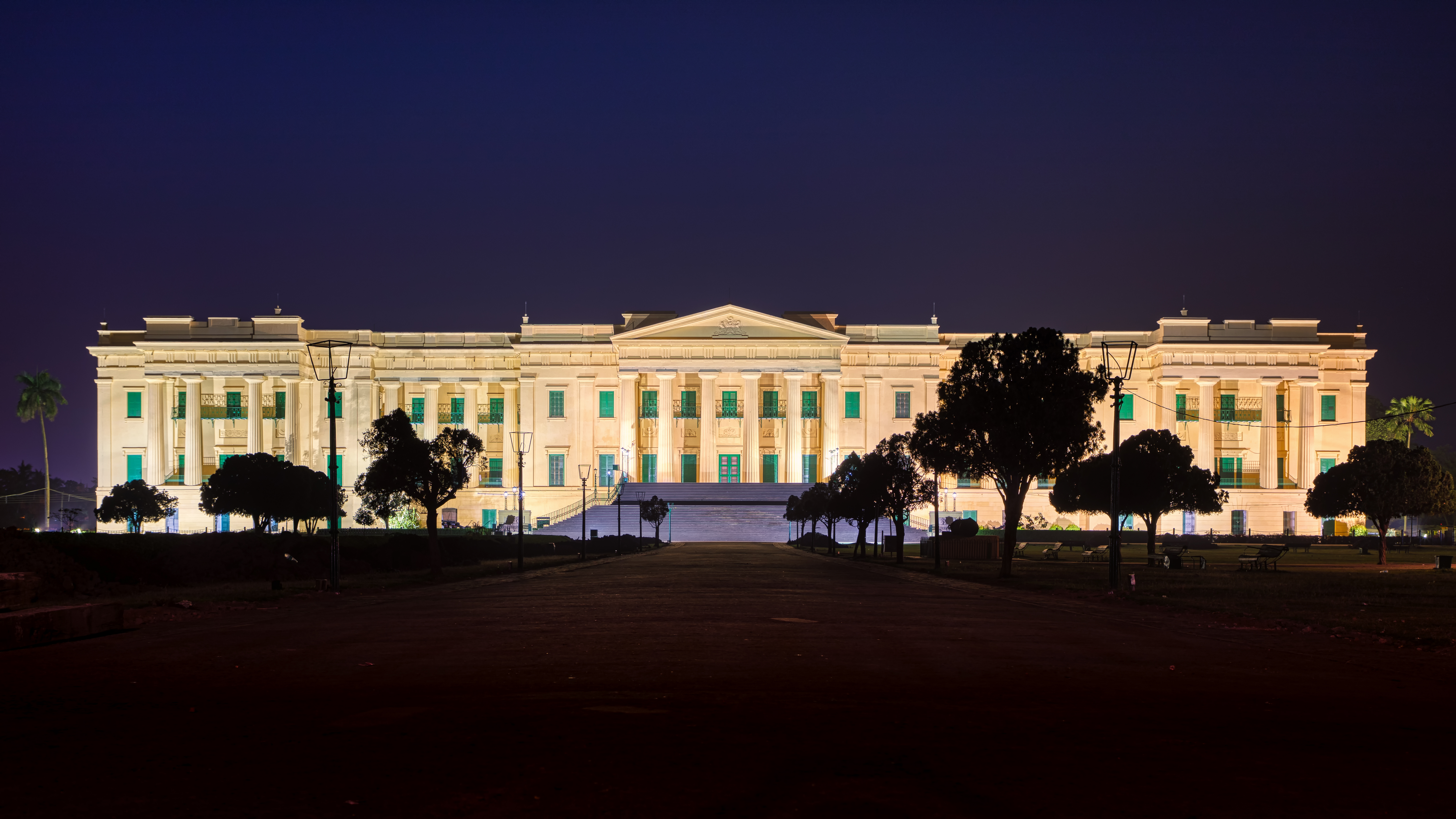
- The palace illuminated at night

- Location within West Bengal
- Former names: Bara Kothi
- Alternative names: Nizamat Kila
- Etymology: Place of 1,000 thousand doors (of which 100 are false)^{[see note a]}

General information
- Type: Palace
- Architectural style: Neoclassical; Italianate; Doric
- Location: Kila Nizamat, Murshidabad, Murshidabad district, West Bengal, India
- Coordinates: 24°11′11″N 88°16′07″E
- Groundbreaking: 9 August 1829
- Completed: December 1837
- Cost: 16.50 Lacs gold coins
- Client: Nawab Nazim Humayun Jah
- Owner: Archaeological Survey of India

Height
- Height: 24 m (80 ft)

Dimensions
- Other dimensions: length: 129 m (424 ft); width: 61 m (200 ft)

Technical details
- Floor count: 3
- Grounds: 41 acres (17 ha)

Design and construction
- Architect: Colonel Duncan MacLeod

Other information
- Parking: Available
- Public transit: train: Hazarduari Express; and bus
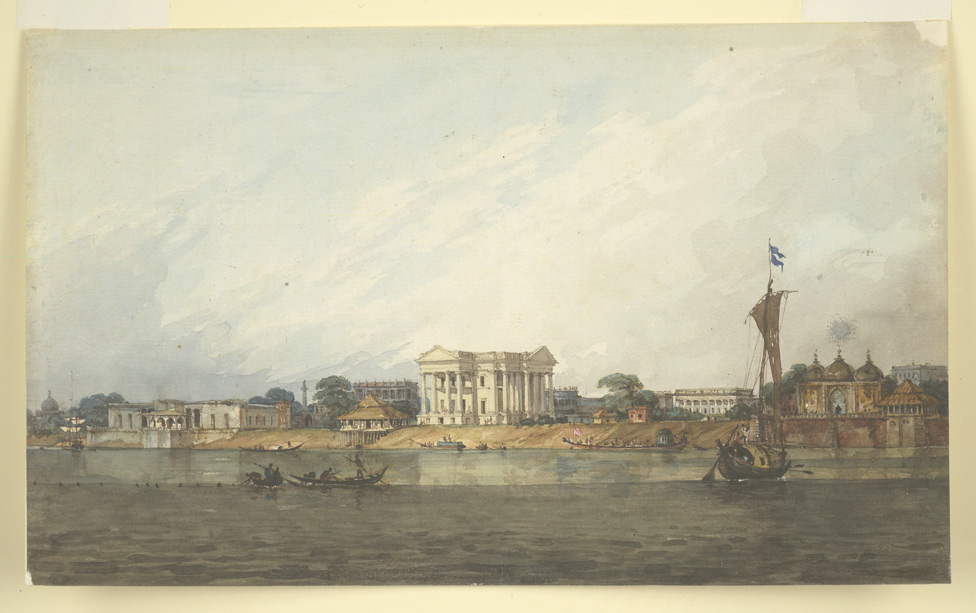
- A c. 1814 painting by William Prinsep of the Nizamat Fort area, showing the old and small Nizamat Fort, from the British Library
- Interactive map of Hazarduari Palace

Monument of National Importance
- Official name: Hazarduari Palace and Imambara (Murshidabad)
- Designated: 1977
- Reference no.: N-WB-122

The Hazarduari Palace, earlier known as the Bara Kothi, is a former palace and now a national monument and public cultural museum, located in the campus of Kila Nizamat in Murshidabad, in the Indian state of West Bengal. It is situated near the bank of the river Ganges. Based on designs by Colonel Duncan McLeod, the palace was built in the nineteenth-century Neoclassical Italianate style with Doric order influences, by Humayun Jah, the Nawab of Bengal between 1824 and 1838.

Together with the Nizamat Imambara, the palace has been a Monument of National Importance since 1977, and administered by the Archaeological Survey of India since 1985.

== Kila Nizamat ==
The Kila Nizamat, also known as the Nizamat Kila and the Nizamat Imambara (Nizamat Fort), was the site of the old fort of Murshidabad. It was located on the present site of the Hazarduari Palace, on the banks of the Bhagirathi River. The fort was demolished to make way for the palace.

== Etymology ==
The palace draws its name from hazar, which means "thousand", and duari, which means "the one with doors". Hence, the name means "the one with a thousand doors". The palace was known as Bara Kothi, named as the palace that has one thousand doors, of which one hundred are false. (Note: The ASI states that the building "...contains about thousand real and false doors." However, the number of false and real doors varies widely, depending upon source. Some sources state that 100 doors are false; another source that 110 doors are real; and some that 100 doors are real (and, hence, 900 doors are false).) They were built so that if any thief or robber tried to steal something and escape, he would be confused between the false and real doors and by that time he would be caught by the Nawab's guards.

== Architecture ==
Hazarduari Palace is a three-storied palatial building, set on a 17-hectare (41-acre) site, built in the Neoclassical Italianate style. The palace was designed by Colonel Duncan MacLeod, a Scottish architect of the Bengal Corps of Engineers, between 1829 and 1837. The palace is characterised by its symmetrical façade and triangular pediment portico supported by 52 Doric columns. The main gates are adorned with Naubat Khana (musician galleries); and each gate is large and high enough for an elephant to pass, with its howdah. The palace can be accessed by a flight of 37 stone steps on its northern side, with a base step that is 33 metres (108 ft) wide, with a stone lion statue on either side.

The former palace building is 129 metres (424 ft) long, 61 metres (200 ft) wide, and 24 metres (80 ft) high. Inside the palace, there are 114 large and lavishly decorated rooms, that include Durbar Hall, a banqueting hall, drawing rooms, sitting rooms, billiard rooms, a ballroom, library, committee room, and portrait gallery. The library has more than 3,000 manuscripts in Arabic, Persian, and Urdu, almost 12,000 books in English, Arabic, and Persian. The library contains a copy of the British Constitution, a hand-scribed Quran that is 1.2 metres (4 ft) long, 0.91 metres (3 ft) wide, and weighs approximately 20 kilograms (44 lb), and a large range of other historical texts and maps of the Mughal era.

In 1977 Hazarduari Palace was declared a Monument of National Importance, initially managed by the Government of West Bengal. The Archaeological Survey of India has administered the site since 1985, to enhance preservation. The former palace has been transformed into a museum which houses collections from the Nawabs including paintings, furniture, and other antiquities, including a secret mirror and large chandelier, that used to accommodate 1,001 candles, and now 96 light globes.

Located adjacent to the palace, are the Nizamat Imambara, the Murshidabad Clock Tower, both the old and new Madina Mosque, the Chawk Masjid, Bacchawali Tope, the Shia complex, Wasif Manzil, the two Zurud Mosques and Nizamat College.

== Miniature ==
A miniature of the palace, made by Sagore Mistri in ivory, along with portraits of His Highness and his son, among other presents, were sent to King William IV. He honoured the Nawab with a full-size portrait of His Majesty and an autographed letter, and conferred upon him the badge and insignia of the Royal Guelphic and Hanoverian order, which are still preserved in the former palace.

== Gallery ==
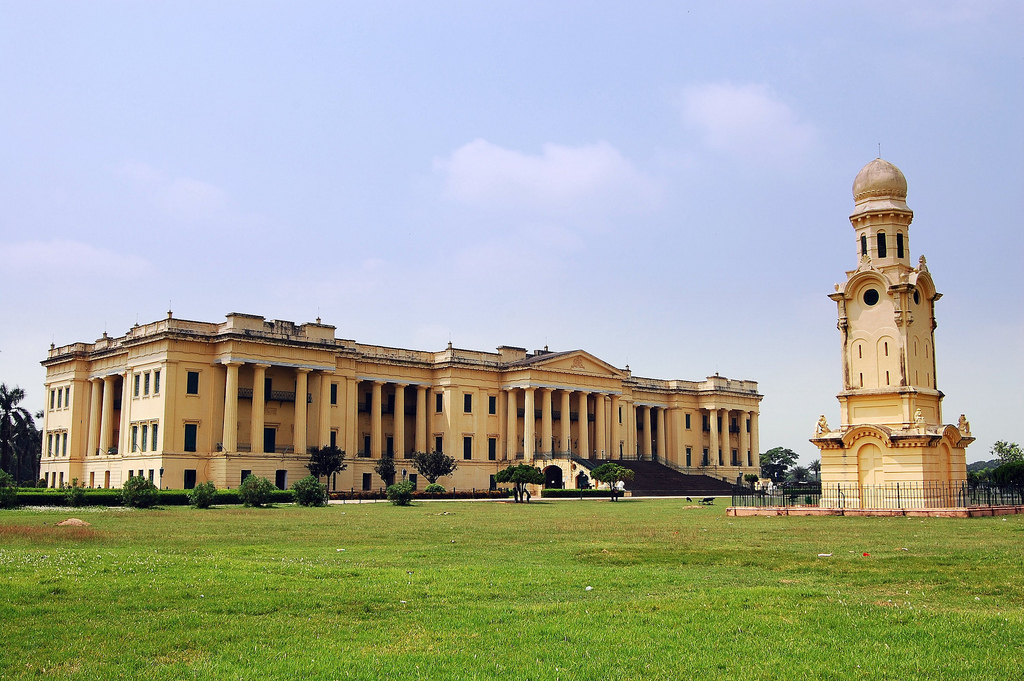
The clock tower with the palace in the backdrop

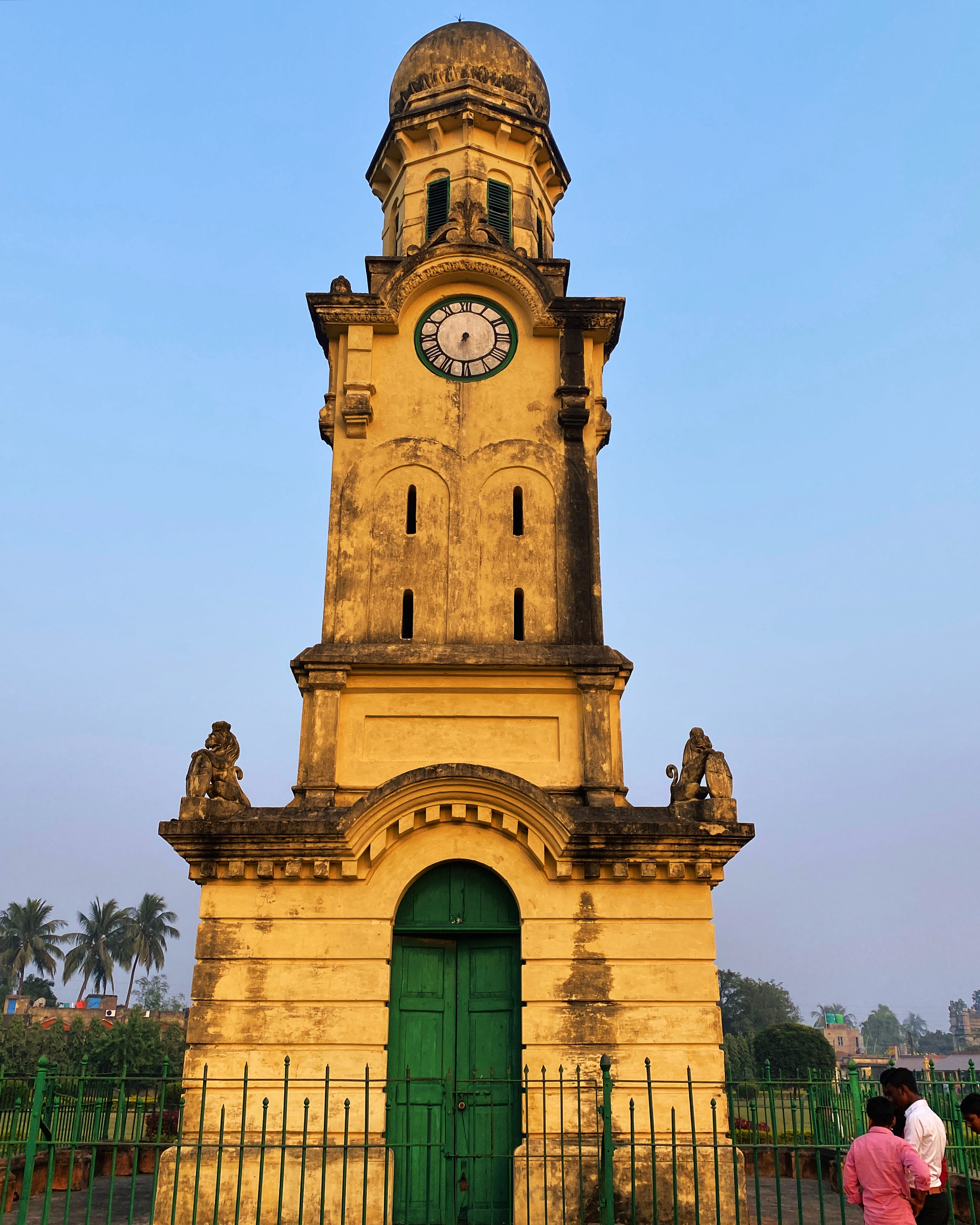
Clock tower

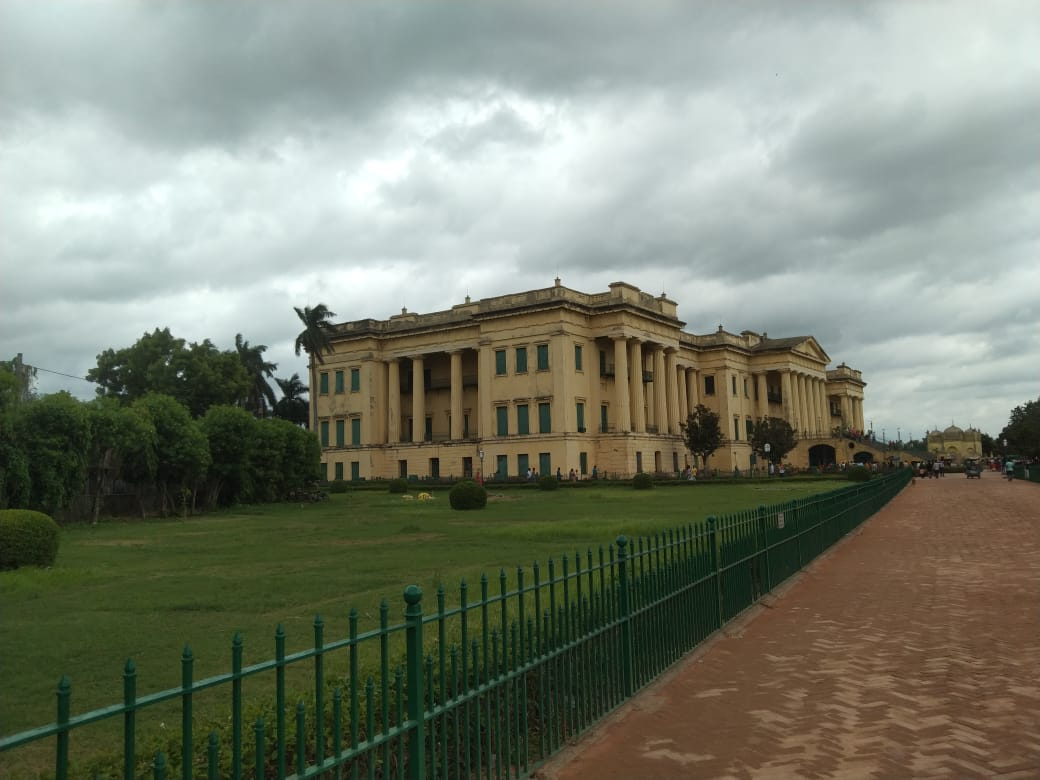
Hazarduari Palace

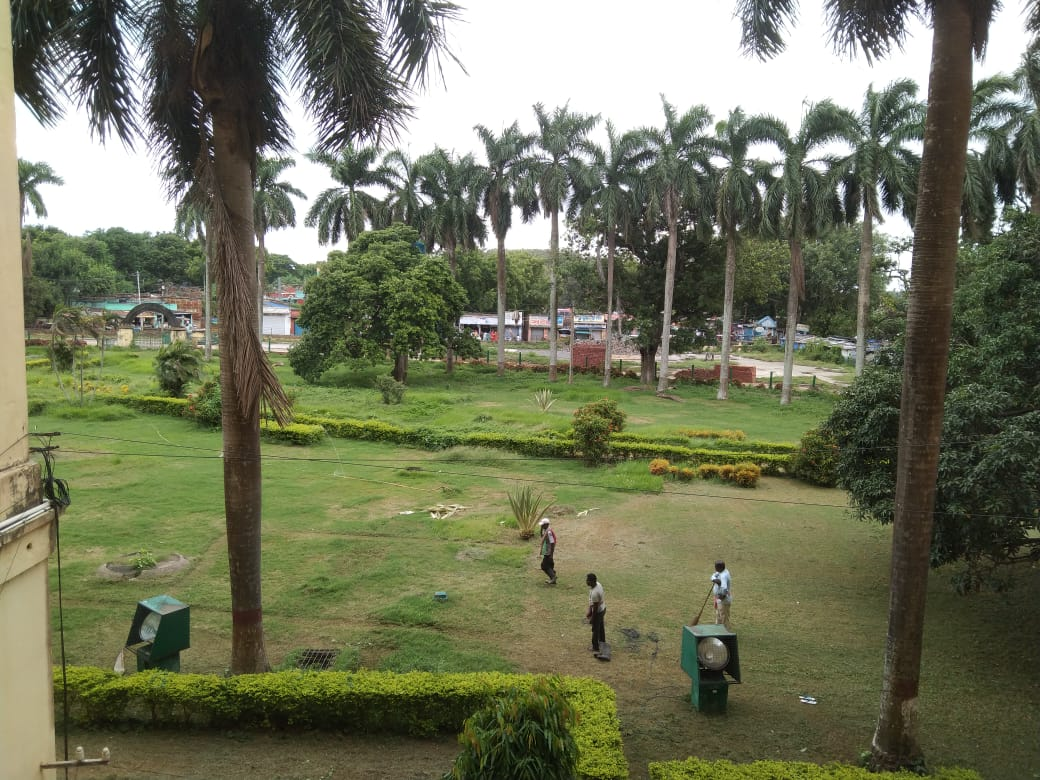
The palace gardens

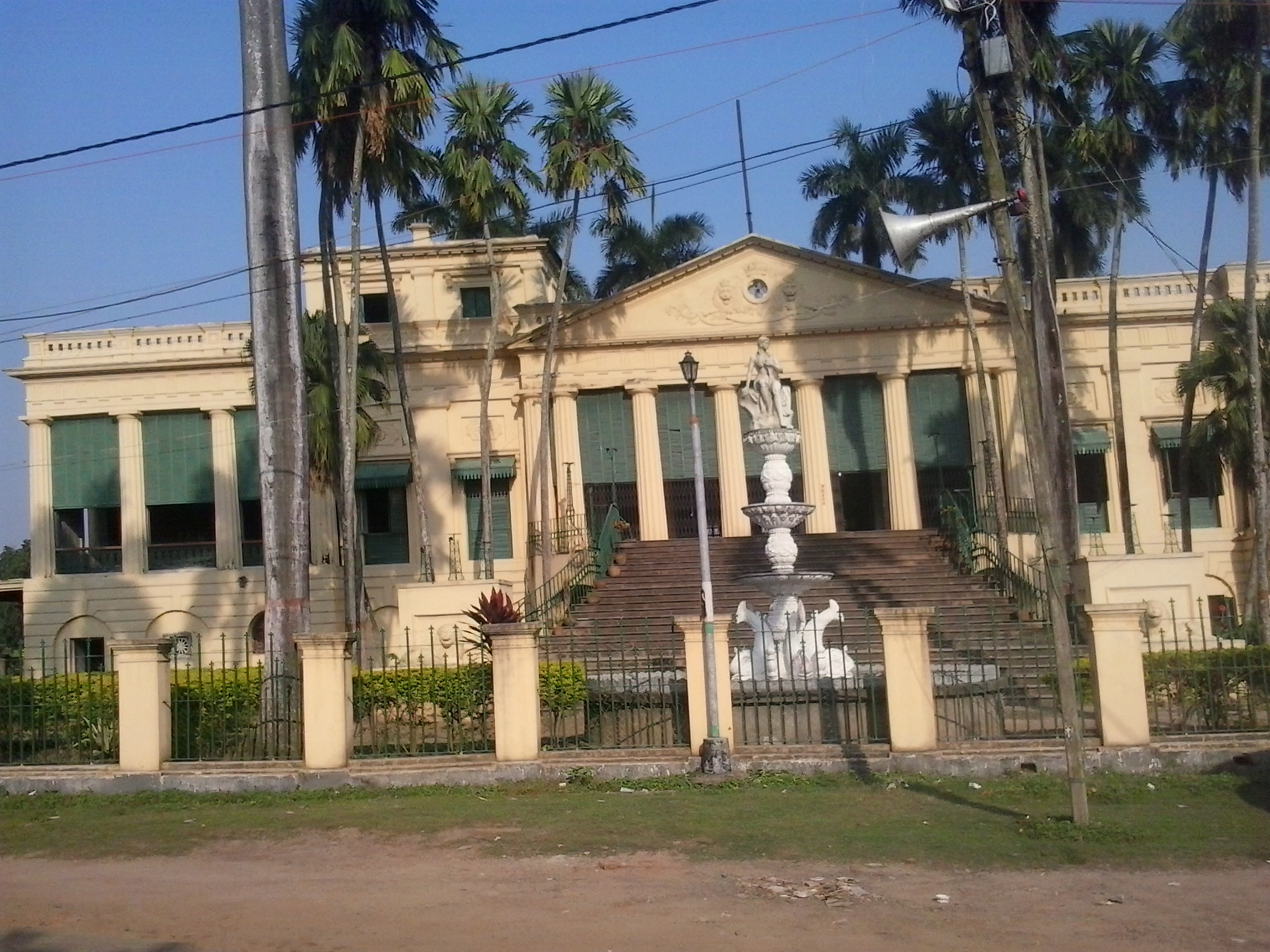
Hazarduari Palace from the back

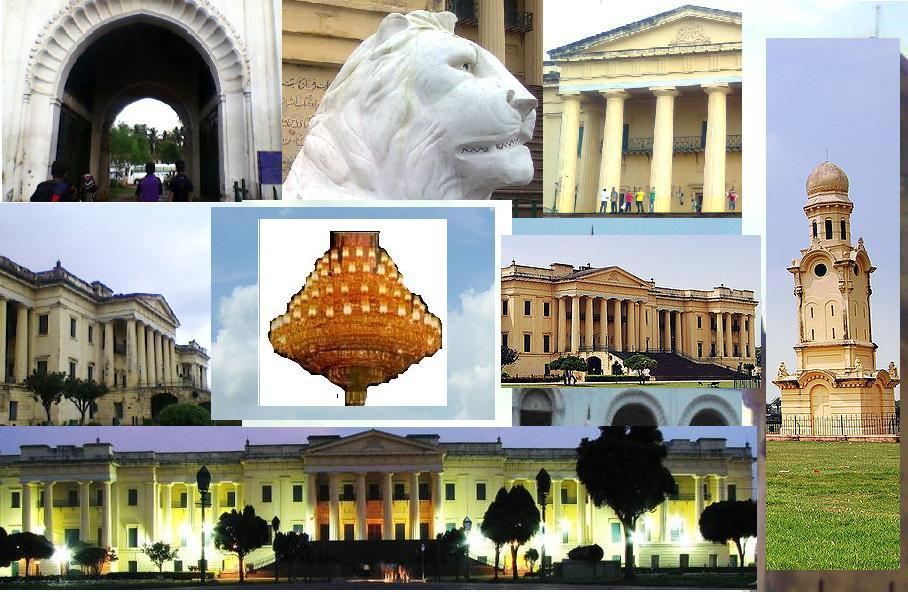
The palace's chandelier is the second largest in the world after that in the Buckingham Palace

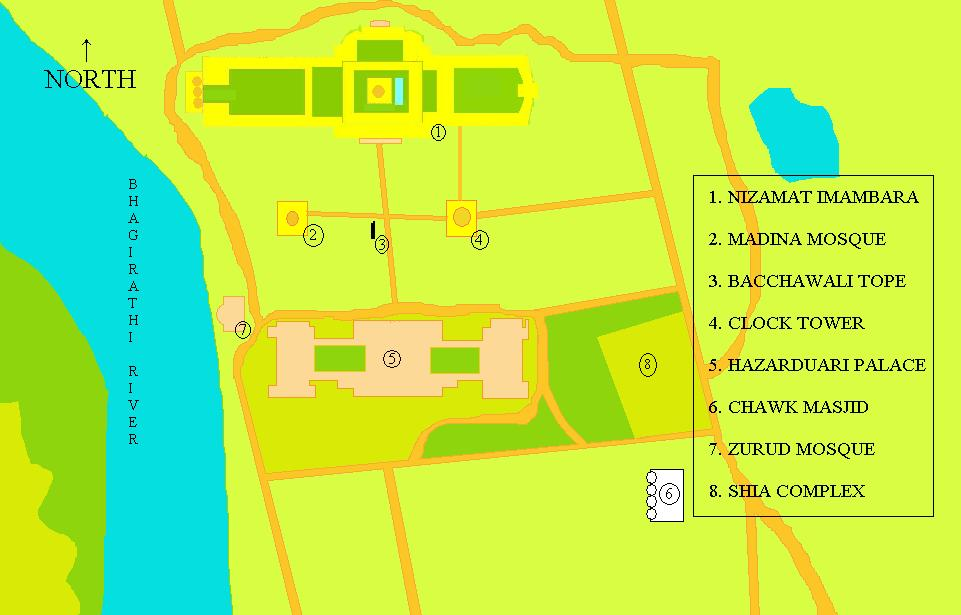
A map of the Nizamat Fort Campus, showing the Nizamat Imambara in yellow and other buildings

== See also ==
- History of Bengal
- History of Bangladesh
- Nawabs of Bengal and Murshidabad
