= Jagat Seth family =

Merchant and banker family of Bengal (1652–1912)

House of Jagat Seth
- Family
- Panoramic view of the mansion of Jagat Seth in Murshidabad, West Bengal
- Country: Mughal Empire; Bengal Subah; Bengal Presidency
- Current region: Bengal
- Etymology: 'Merchant/Banker of the world' (Persian)
- Origin: Nagaur
- Founded: 1652
- Founder: Hiranand Shah
- Historic seat: Murshidabad
- Members: Hiranand Shah; Manik Chand; Fateh Chand; Mehtab Chand; Maharaj Swaroop Chand
- Traditions: Jainism
- Estate: House of Jagat Seth
- Dissolution: 1912

Jagat Seth was a wealthy merchant, banker and moneylender family from Murshidabad in Bengal during the time of the Nawabs of Bengal.

Though not at the same scale, the influence exercised by this family in the finances of the Mughal Empire during the 17th and 18th century was akin to that exercised by the Rothschild family in Europe.

== History ==
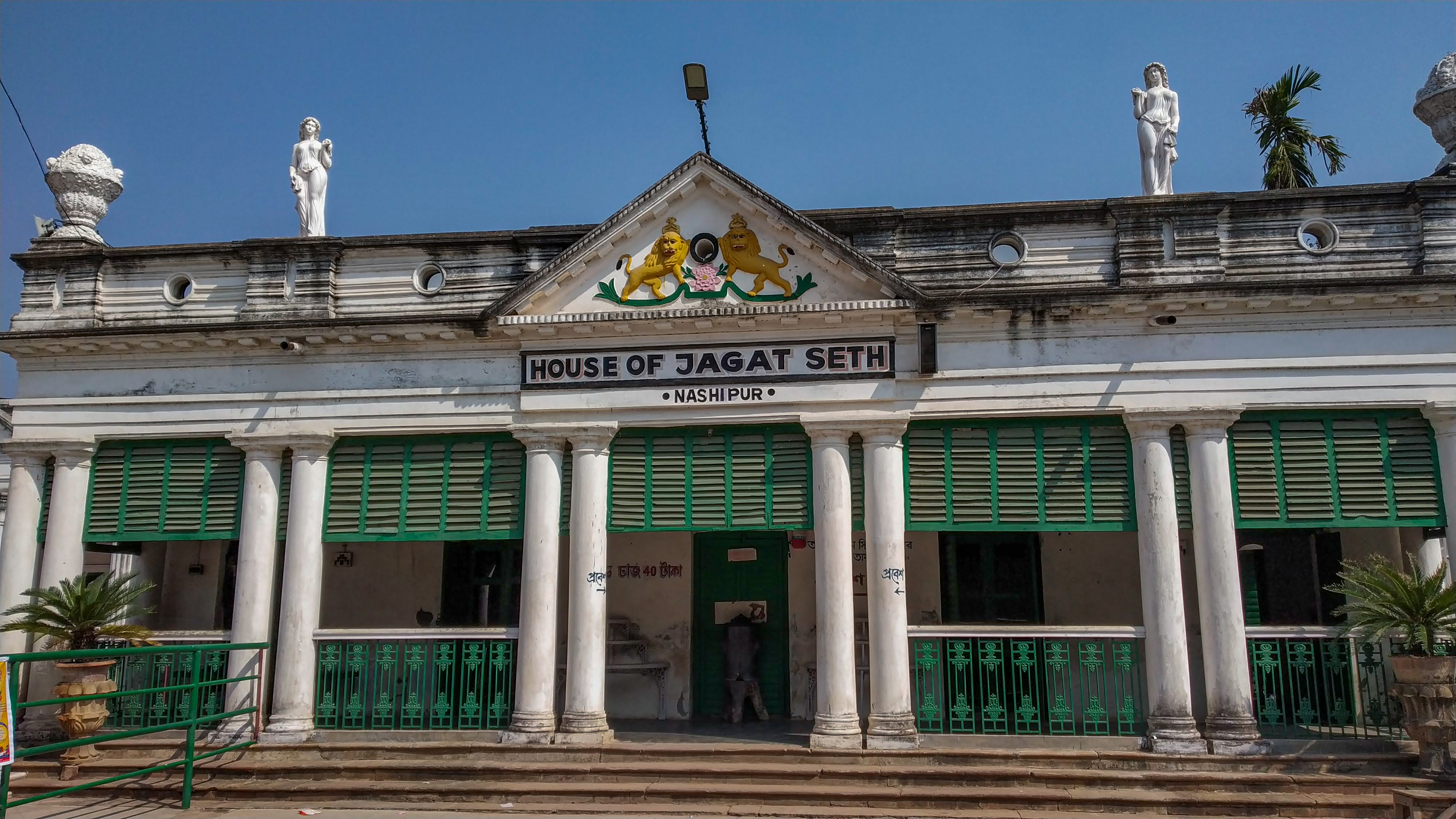
House of Jagat Seth in Murshidabad

The house was established by a Jain Oswal Bania named Hiranand Shah from Nagaur, Rajasthan, who came to Patna in 1652. In 1713, Manikchand helped Prince Farrukhsiyar financially to become the Mughal Emperor. In award, Farrukhsiyar conferred the title of Jagat Seth on Manik Chand, the head of the family, meaning "banker or merchant of the world". This indicates the favour the family had gained at the Mughal court.

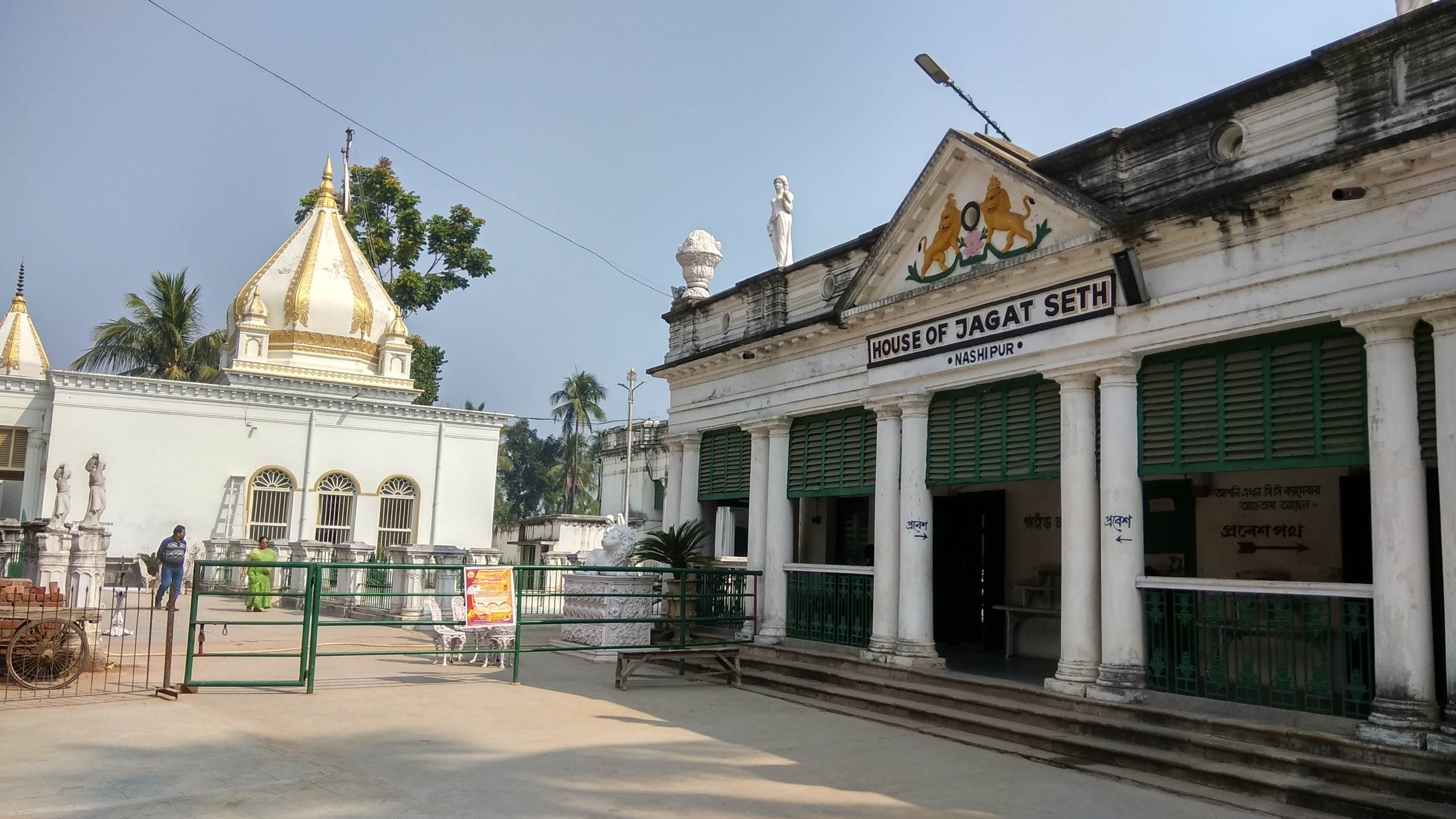
Kachari bari (office premises) of the Palace of Jagat Seth

Roben Orme, the official historian of the British East India Company described Jagat Seth as the greatest banker and money changer known in the world at that time. The historian Ghulam Hussain Khan believed that "their wealth was such that there is no mentioning it without seeming to exaggerate and to deal in extravagant fables". They built up their business towards the last quarter of the 17th century and by the 18th century, it was perhaps the largest banking house in the country. In the 1750s, their entire wealth was estimated to be 140 million rupees. Jagat Seth was extremely influential in financial matters in Bengal and had a monopoly of minting coins there.

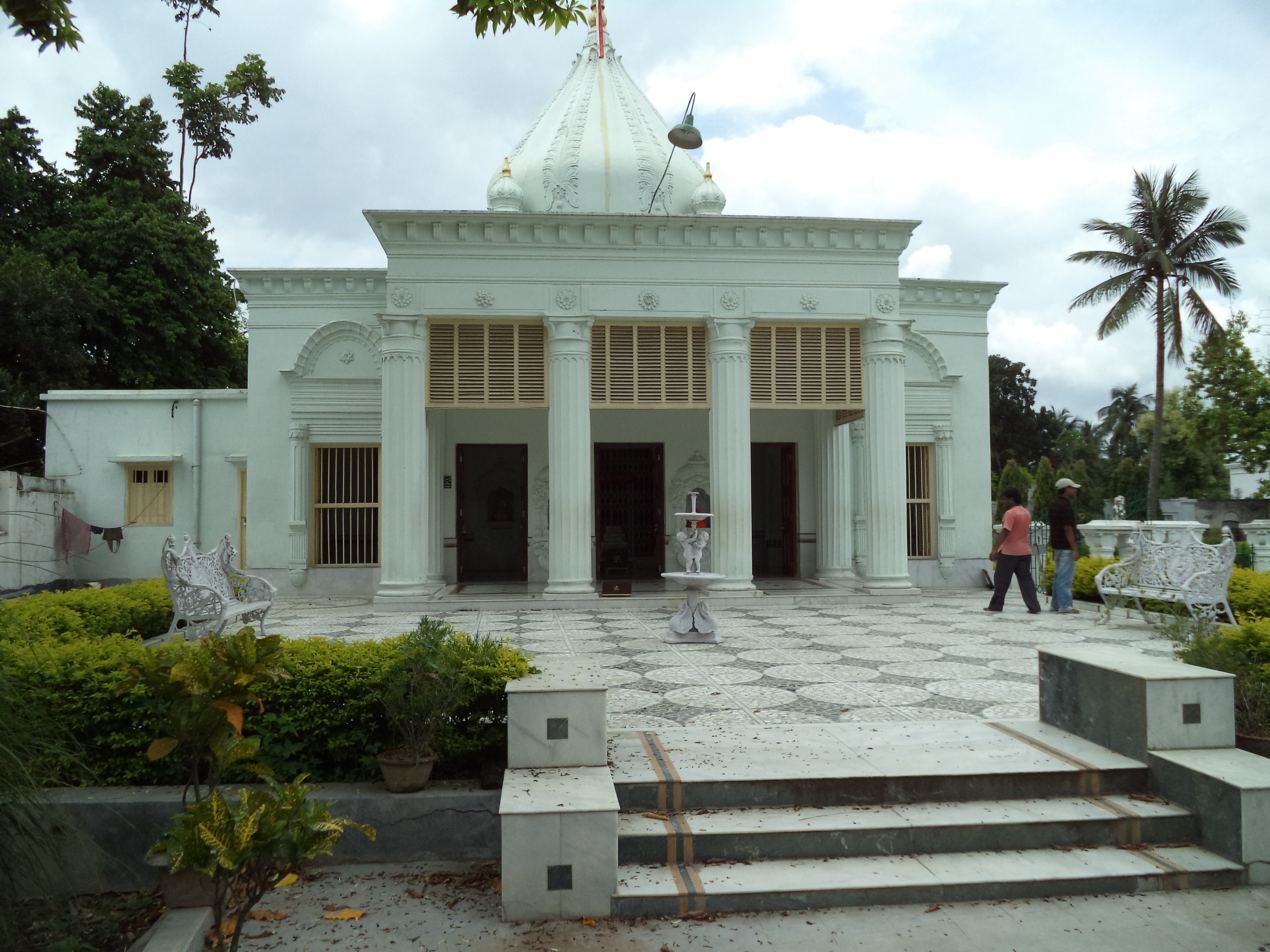
The temple associated with memory of Jagat Sett's house at Mahimapur

The Nawabs of Bengal such as Murshid Quli Khan used the credit networks of the Jagat Seth family to pay annual tribute to the Mughal Emperors in Delhi. Alivardi Khan came to the throne of Bengal in a military coup financed and planned by the Jagat Seths. According to William Dalrymple, they could "make or break anyone in Bengal, including the ruler, and their political instincts were sharp as their financial ones". Once a local businessman named Kantu borrowed money from Jagat Seth Fateh Chand and was interested in the purchase of silk. However, he failed to return the money. Indian businessmen refused to deal with the East India Company unless Kantu returned the money to Fateh Chand. This shows the great respect the local businessmen had for the Jagat Seths. Fateh Chand suffered a great loss in Delhi during Nader Shah's sack of the city in 1740, but he was able to continue his business. He died on 2 December 1744. The Jagat Seths were the most prominent moneylenders to the East India Company.

During the Maratha invasions of Bengal, the Bargi Maratha mercenaries plundered the mansion of the Jagat Seth, taking away 25 million rupees as booty.

=== Conspiracy against Siraj ud-Daulah ===
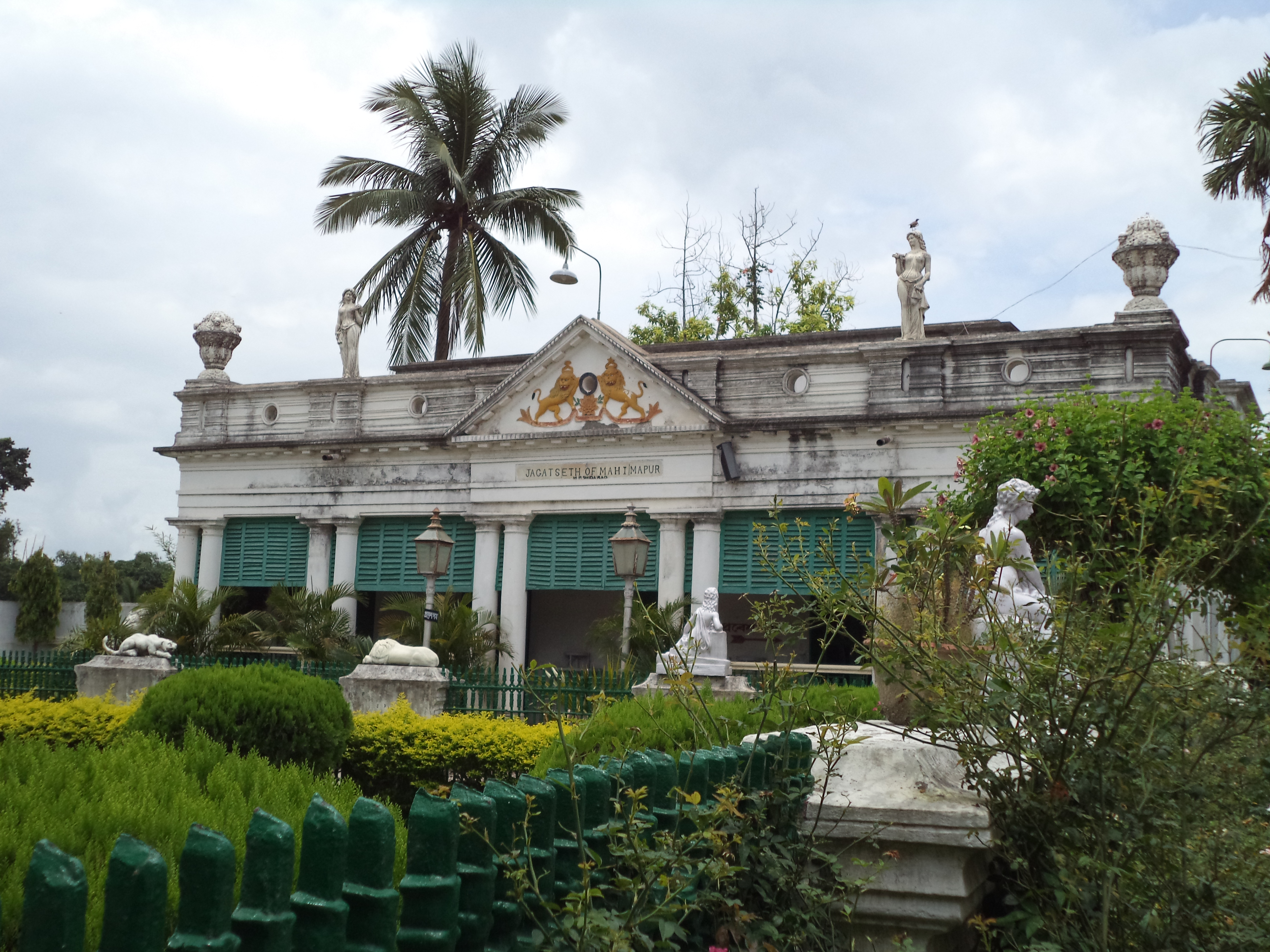
House of Jagat Seth

Siraj ud-Daulah, the new Nawab of Bengal, alienated figures important to the interest of his state- including the Jagat Seth Mehtab Chand. The Nawab demanded a lavish tribute of 30 million rupees from the banker. Jagat Seth Mehtab Chand refused, and a result, Siraj ud-Daulah hit him. The Jagat Seth was a co-conspirator of Robert Clive against Siraj ud-Daulah, along with other alienated figures, among them prominent being- Mir Jafar, Krishnachandra Roy, Omichund, Yar Lutuf Khan, Rai Durlabh & other leading men. The Jagat Seth and other wealthy bankers funded the British for the conspiracy.

Any members of the conspiracy group had no intention to found British rule in India, instead they were just concerned about their political futures.

== Decline ==
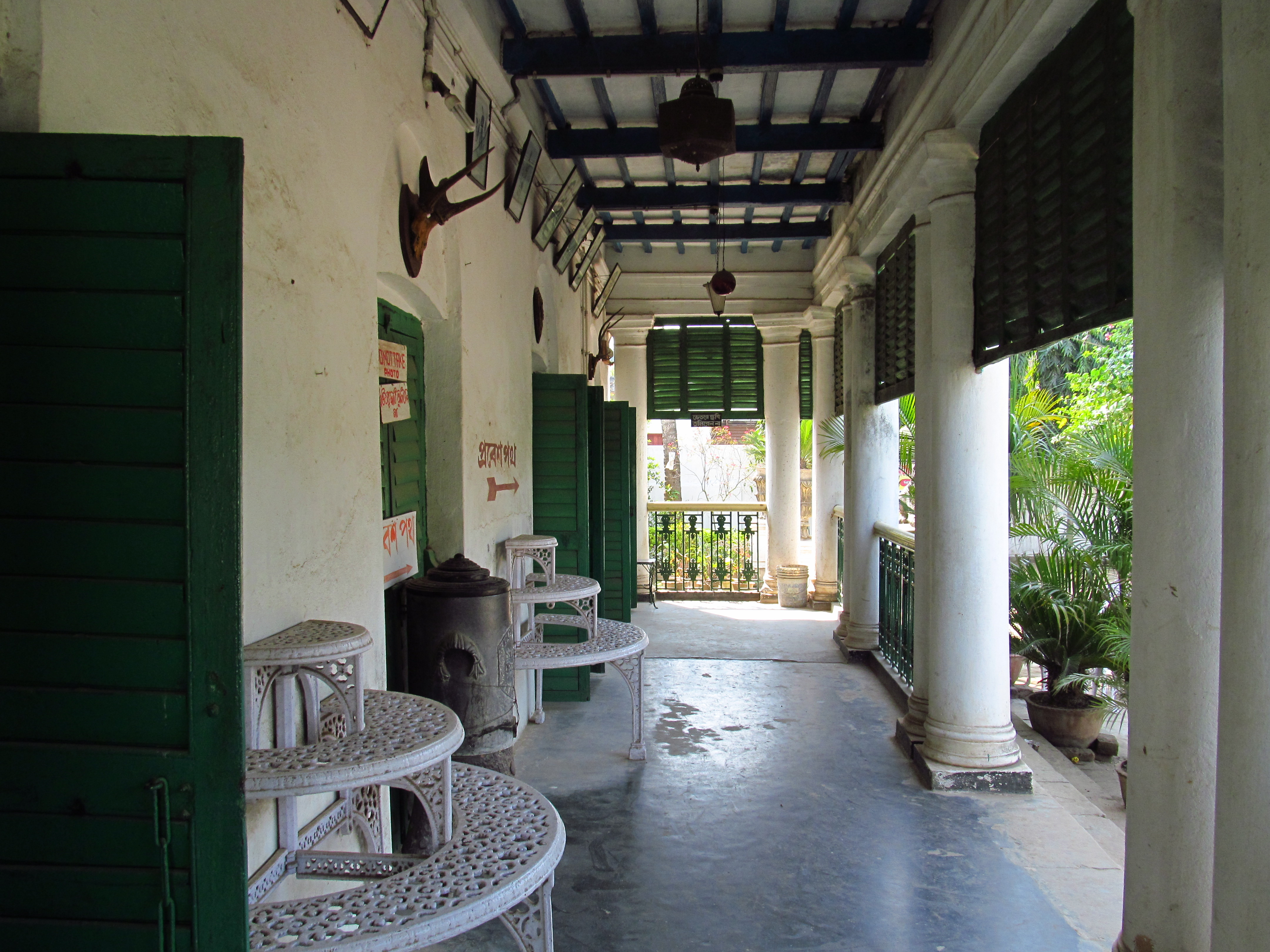
Corridor of Jagat Seth's official residence

After the Battle of Plassey, Mir Qasim became the new Nawab. He organised the killing of several members of the family including Jagat Seth Mehtab Chand and his cousin Swarup Chand, in 1763, and threw their bodies off the ramparts of Munger Fort. Mahtab Chand's son, Kushal Chand, was granted the title of Jagat Seth, but with the transfer of the treasury and mint to Kolkata by the British, the need of a private banker at Murshidabad was vastly diminished.

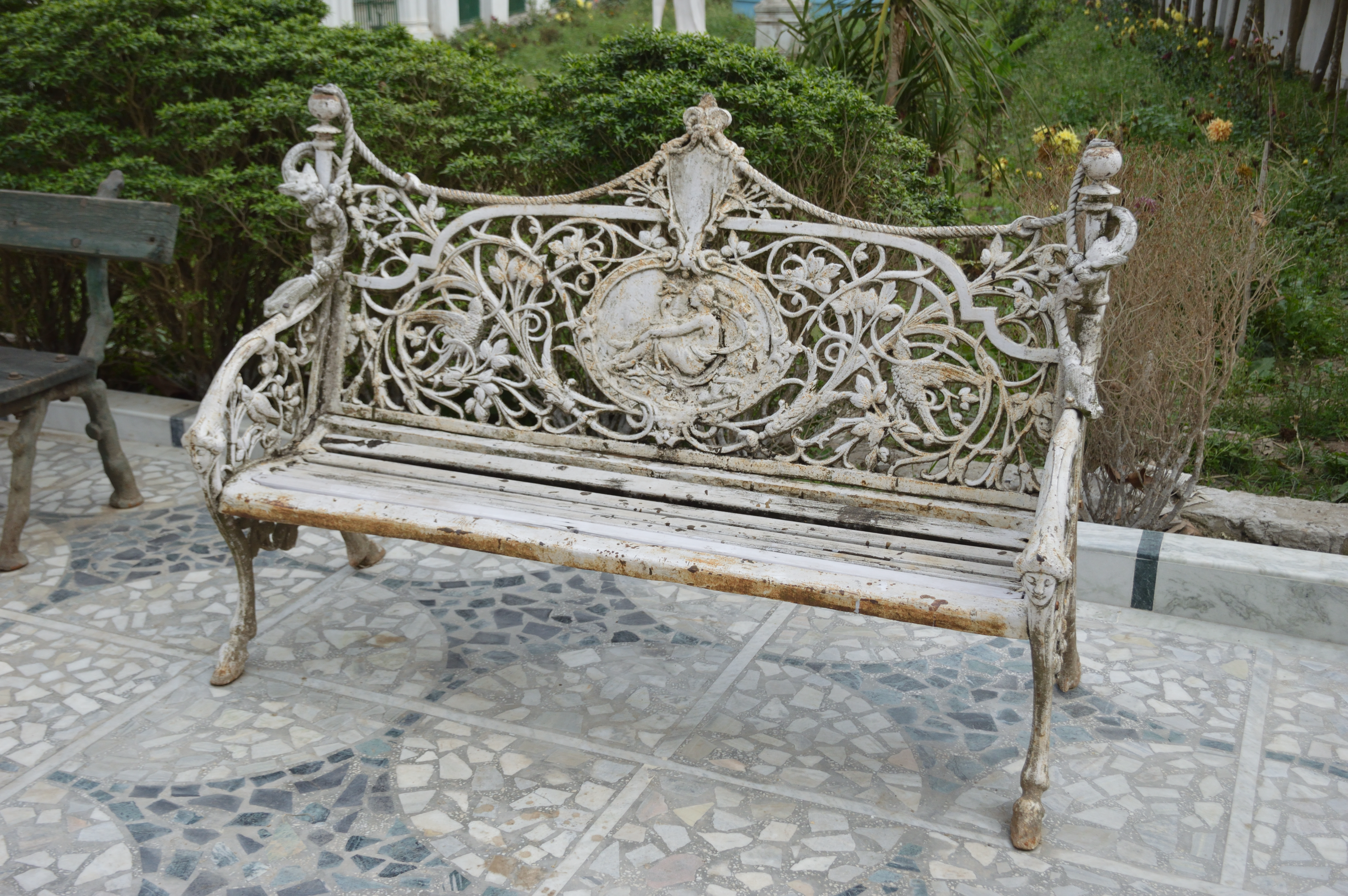
Garden bench at the house of Jagat Seth

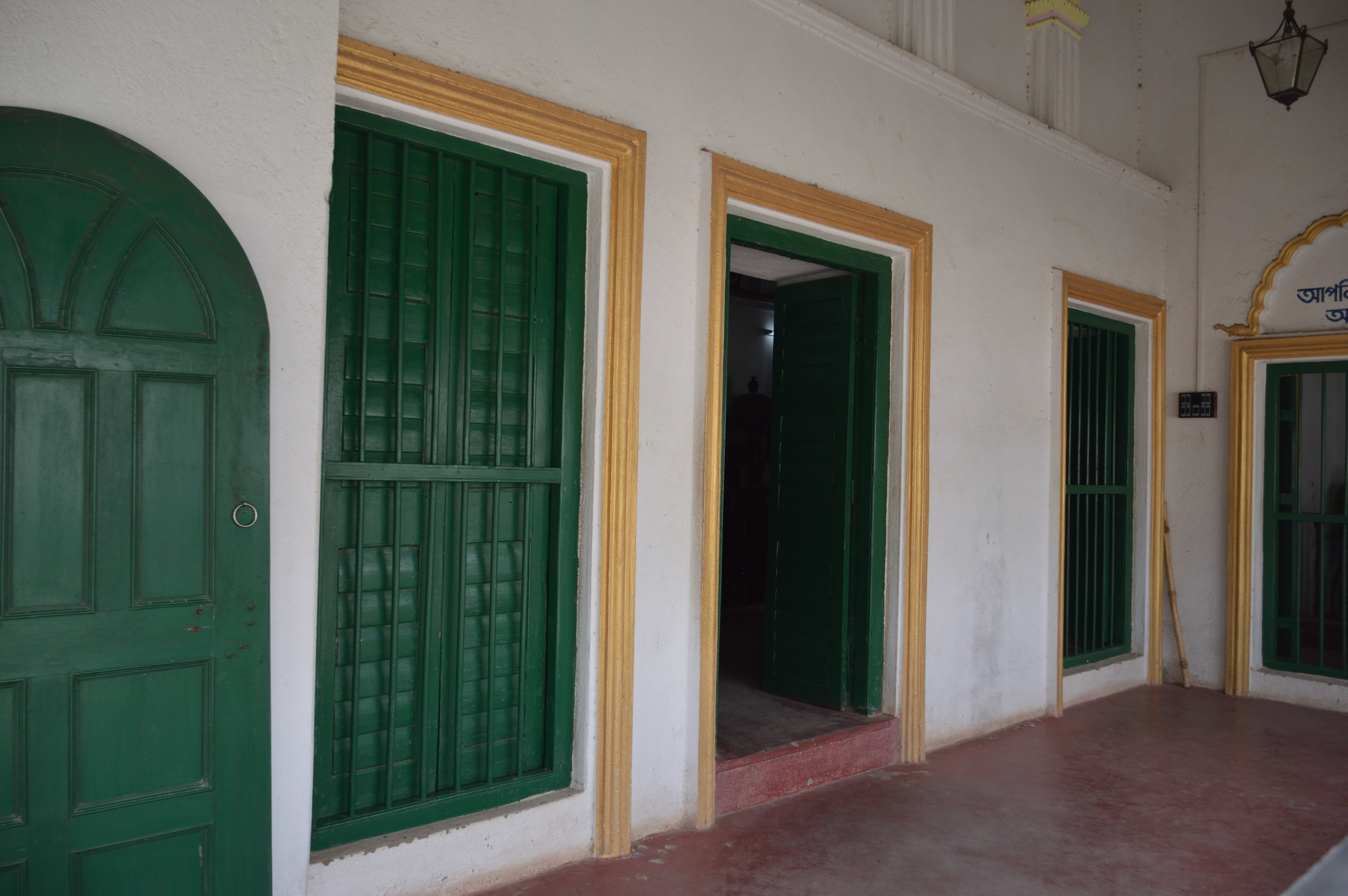
Interior of the house of Jagat Seth

Kushal Chand was only 18 years old when he became the Seth. He lacked his father Mehtab Chand's political shrewdness and was a spendthrift. Thus the fortunes of the Jagat Seths began declining. Govindchand, the next Seth, died in 1864, succeeded by Gopal Chand and Gulab Chand respectively. By then, the fortunes of the family had declined by a considerable amount. The last member of the family died in 1912, their fortunes being a thing of the past and surviving on a pension given by the British.

== Museum ==
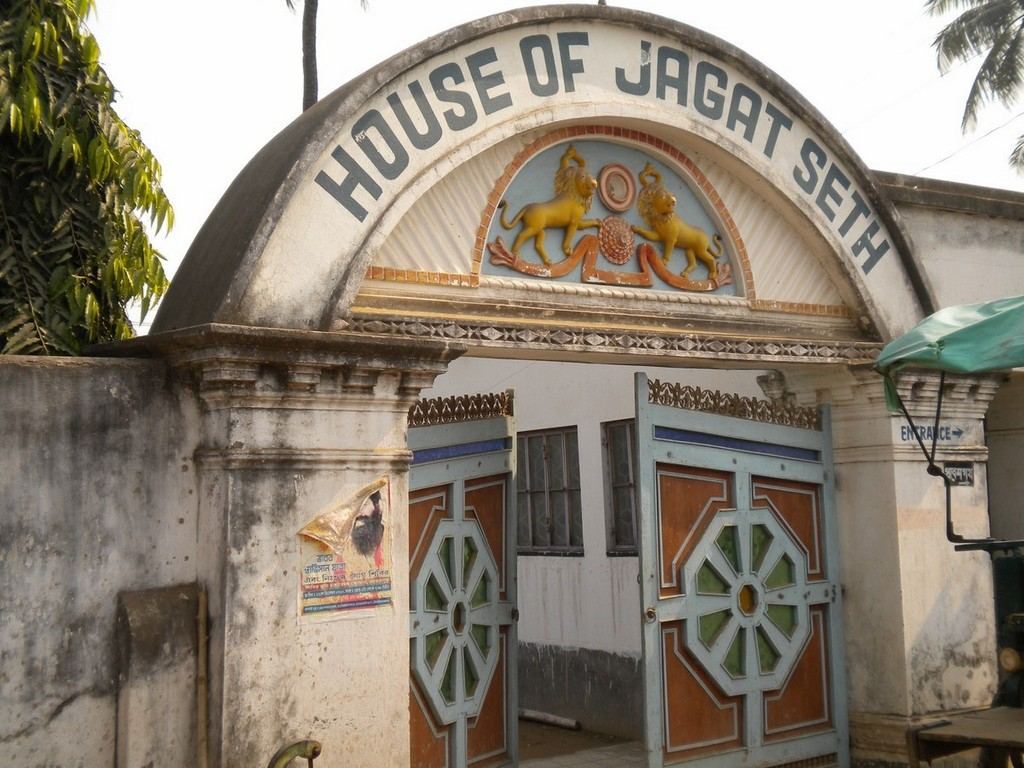
Gate (main entrance) of the house of Jagat Seth

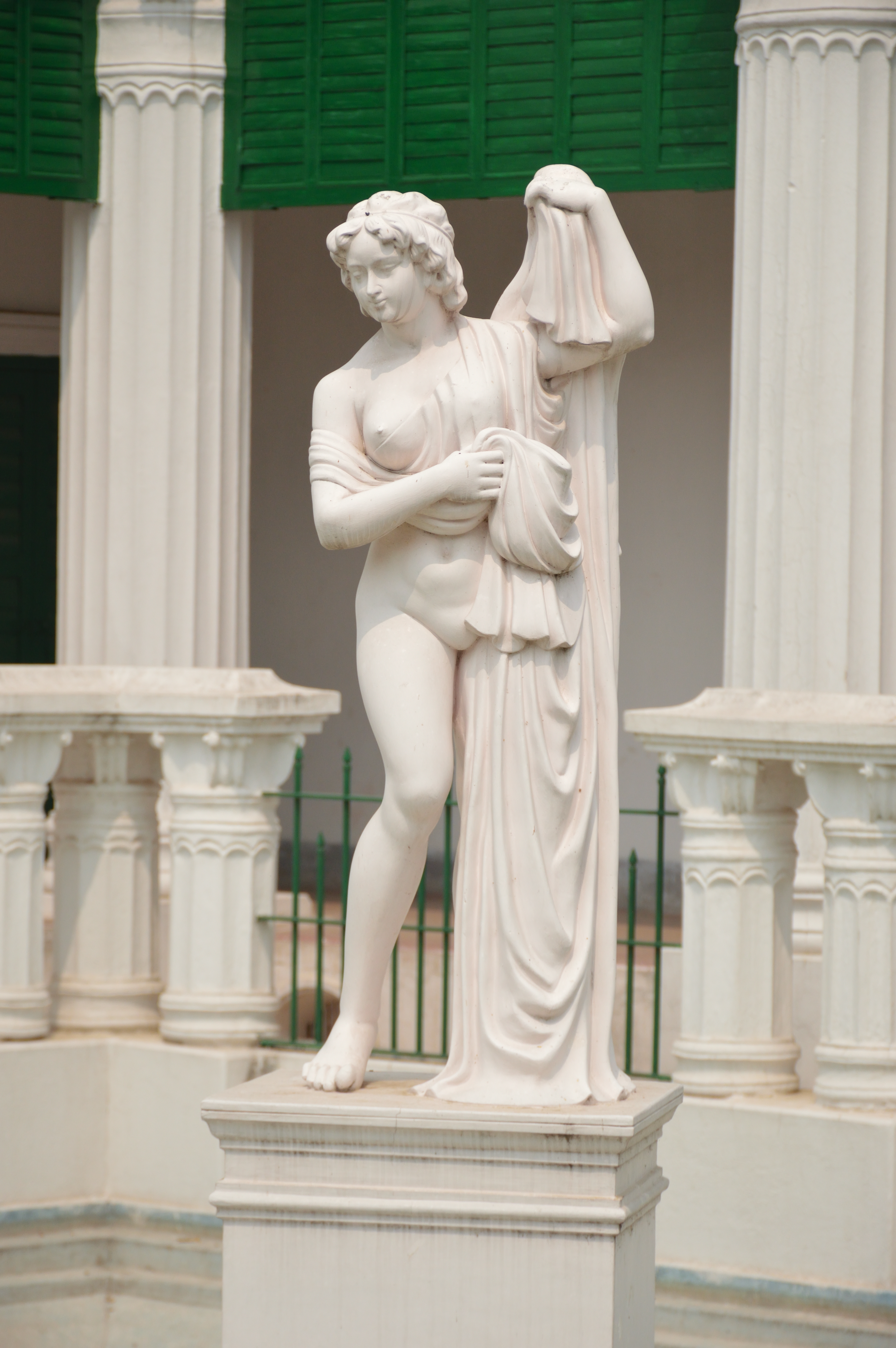
Sculpture at the Jagat Seth's house in Mahimapur, Murshidabad

The house of the Jagat Seths in Mahimapur locality of Murshidabad city of West Bengal state, complete with a secret tunnel as well as an underground chamber, where illegal trade plans were hatched was converted into a museum in 1980. It is privately managed. It contains personal possessions of the Jagat Seth family including coins, and muslin and other extravagant clothes, such as Banarasi sarees embroidered with gold and silver threads.

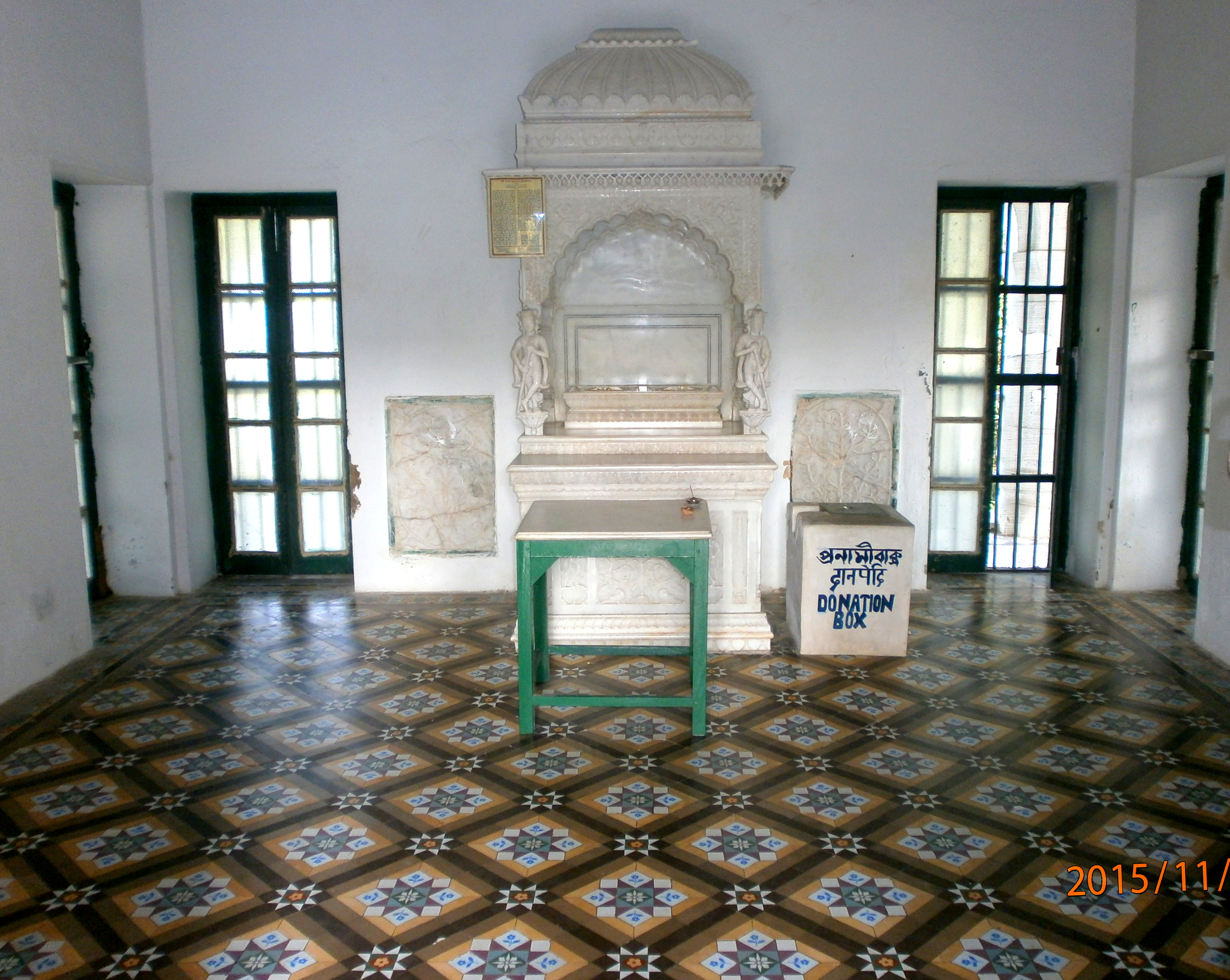
Jain foot marks inside the temple within Jagat Seth's palace

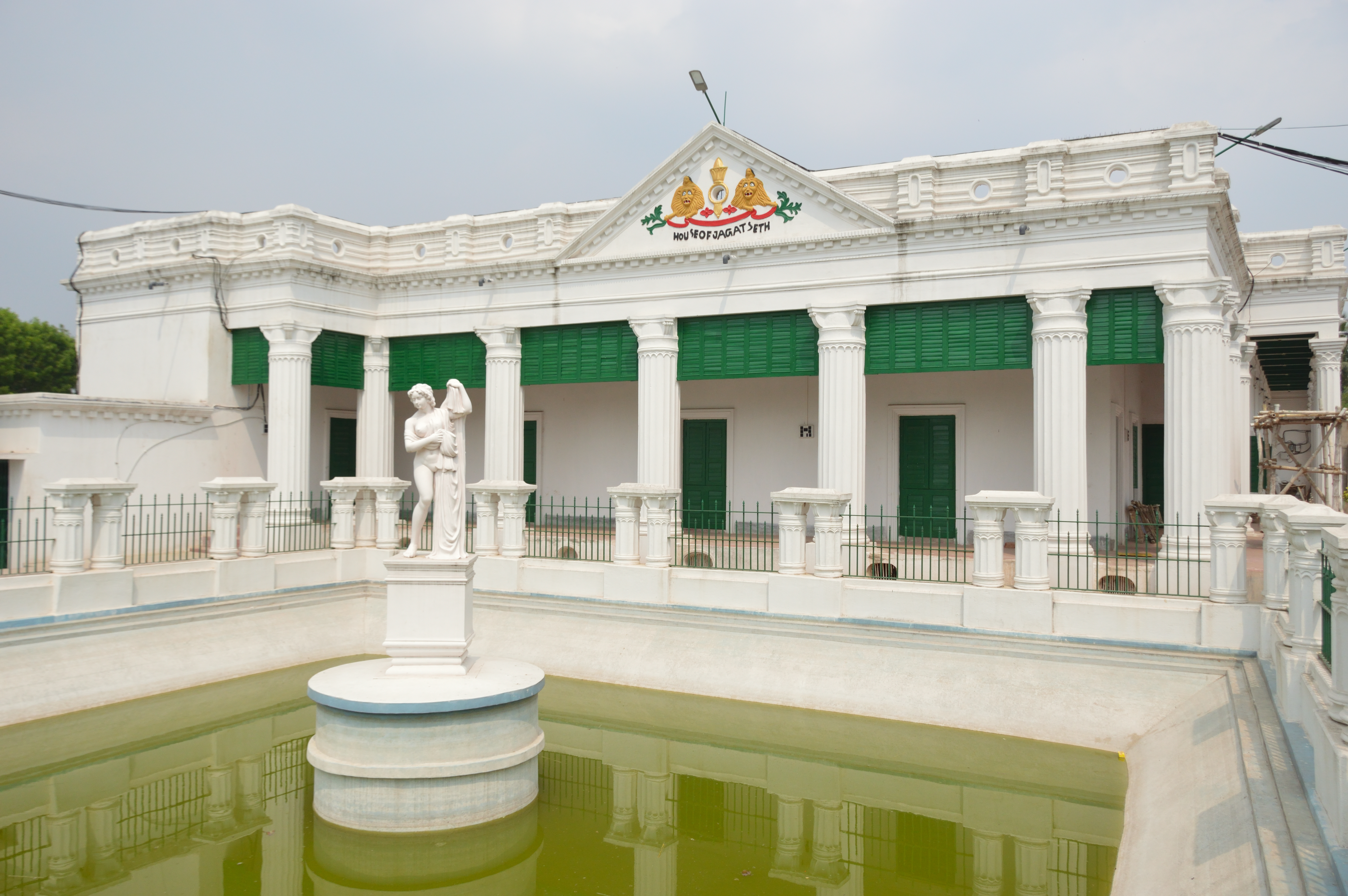
Middle building with pool

According to the Archaeological Survey of India the house, temple and ruins associated with the memory of Jagat Seth's house at Mahimapur are State Protected Monuments (Item no S-WB-94).

== See also ==
- Siraj ud-Daulah
- East India Company
- Nawabs of Bengal
