= Sinfray =

French general (fl. 1747–1757)

Monsieur Sinfray, (fl. 1747–1757) or Monsieur de St. Frais, was a French artillery officer in the Battle of Plassey (1757), who fought for Siraj Ud Daulah, Nawab of Bengal. He was also the secretary to the Council at Chandernagore. Earlier, he succeeded D.E. Choisis as Chef de Yanaon in 1747.

== See also ==
- Colonial History of Yanam
