= 9 (Plassey) Battery Royal Artillery =

British Army artillery battery

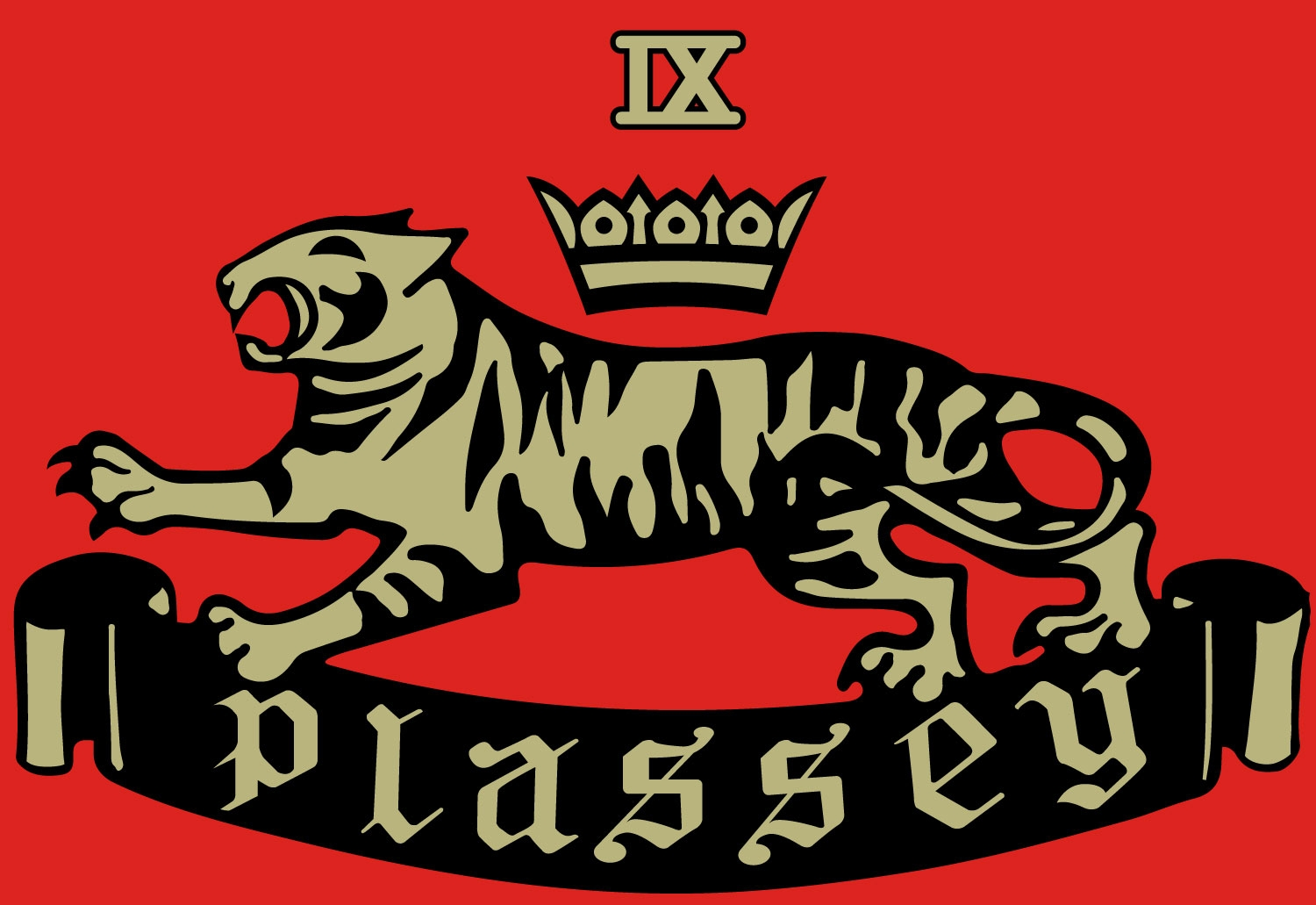
- Active: 17 June 1748 – present
- Country: United Kingdom
- Allegiance: Hon East India Coy (till 1858); United Kingdom (post 1858)
- Branch: British Indian Army; British Army
- Type: Artillery
- Role: Anti-aircraft
- Size: Battery
- Part of: 12th Regiment Royal Artillery
- Garrison/HQ: Baker Barracks, Thorney Island, West Sussex
- Anniversaries: Plassey Day 23 June
- Equipment: SP HVM (Starstreak mounted on Stormer)
- Engagements: Battle of Plassey; Third Burma War; Second Boer War; First World War; Second World War; Falklands War; Gulf War Kosovo
- Battle honours: Ubique

9 (Plassey) Battery Royal Artillery is an air defence battery of the Royal Artillery that serves with the British Army's 12th Regiment Royal Artillery. It is stationed at Baker Barracks, Thorney Island, West Sussex.

The battery was originally formed as the first unit of the Bengal Artillery, raised in 1749 as part of the Honourable East India Company's Army. Its original name was 1 Company, Bengal Artillery, and it was stationed in Fort William in Calcutta. It was still manning the fort when the Nawab of Bengal attacked it. The majority of the battery subsequently died as prisoners of the Nawab in the now infamous Black Hole of Calcutta incident. Soon after the battery saw action in the Battle of Plassey as part of the force led by Sir Clive of India on 23 June 1757. It was the battery's heroic actions at this battle which later earned it the honour title 'Plassey'.

On 19 February 1862 all the artillery of the East India Company was transferred to the Royal Artillery, and the battery became 1 Battery, 24 Brigade. In 1876 the battery moved to England and suffered an eclectic 6 years, changing its role and name many times. In 1882 it returned to what it knew and was posted to Burma, fighting in the Third Burma War.

In 1889 it finally settled as 2 Mountain Battery, a title it would retain for the next fifty years. It finally became 9 (Plassey) Battery on 19 March 1947.

== History ==
=== Early history ===
The capture of Madras by the French in 1746 brought home to the Honourable East Indian Company the error of omitting artillery from its regular forces. So on 17 June 1748, the Court of Directors of the Company authorised the formation of three artillery companies in Bengal, Bombay and Madras. These orders took some months to reach India and did not become effective until 1749.

The first Bengal Artillery unit was raised in 1749. It was originally titled 1 Company, Bengal Artillery and was quartered in Fort William, Calcutta. The early records of the Battery were destroyed in the sacking of Calcutta in 1749, so the details are limited. However, it is known that the Battery was commanded by Capt Witherington and consisted of 5 other officers, 4 sergeant-bombardiers, 4 corporals, 100 gunners and 2 drummers. The company, much as like today, was double-hatted; as well as carrying out the normal artillery duties it also performed engineering and labouring tasks.

Fort William was established to protect the Honourable East India Company's growing trade interests in Bengal. The fort provided protection from the French and was a base from which to colonise the remainder of Bengal. The Nawab of Bengal, Suraj Ud Doulah was unimpressed with the British military buildup and saw it as a direct threat to his rule in the province. He ordered an immediate halt to the fort's military enhancements; however, the Company did not heed his instruction and continued their enhancements. The stand off came to a head in June 1756 when he laid siege to the fort.

The garrison commander organised an escape from the fort leaving behind a small military force to hold back the Nawab of Bengal's army, until reinforcements could arrive. The remaining force was commanded by John Zephaniah Howell and was quickly depleted by casualties and deserters. This resulted in the defence becoming untenable. On 20 June 1756 Fort William was in the hands of the Nawab. On capturing the fort the Nawab's Army took 146 prisoners. They were all housed in a 14 by 20 ft room which was later to become known as the ‘Black Hole of Calcutta.’ During the night 123 people died, including 45 members of our original Battery.

The remnants of the Battery escaped to Fulta and joined a detachment of Madras Artillery commanded by Lieutenant William Jennings, part of the relief force of 230 Europeans led by Major Kilpatrick. Further reinforcements arrived at Fulta from Madras in December 1756 under the command of Sir Robert Clive.

The Battery was equipped with 14 guns, most of which were 6-pounders. Under the command of the recently promoted Capt Jennings, they were involved in the battles against the Nawab's Army at Budge-Budge on 29 December and the capture of the Hoogli River on 10 January 1757. The Nawab then tried to counter-attack and assaulted Calcutta in February 1757, unfortunately for him, the attempt failed. Therefore, he was forced to make peace, but on terms advantageous to the Company.

=== First World War ===
The battery fought during the first world war as 2nd Mountain Battery Royal Artillery spending most of the war fighting in the Salonika Campaign in the area of Lake Doiran.

=== Post World War Two ===
On arrival in Germany, 12th Regiment was converted to the anti-aircraft role as part of 6th Armoured Division and the battery was re-equipped with Bofors guns (initially with the L/60 variant, later L/70). It spent most of the 1950s and 1960s in Germany, though from 1963 to 1966 it was at Tampin, Malaya (at the time of the confrontation). From 25 November 1971 to 17 March 1972 it undertook the first of nine roulement tours to Northern Ireland (Operation Banner) in the infantry role, either with 12th Regiment or separately.

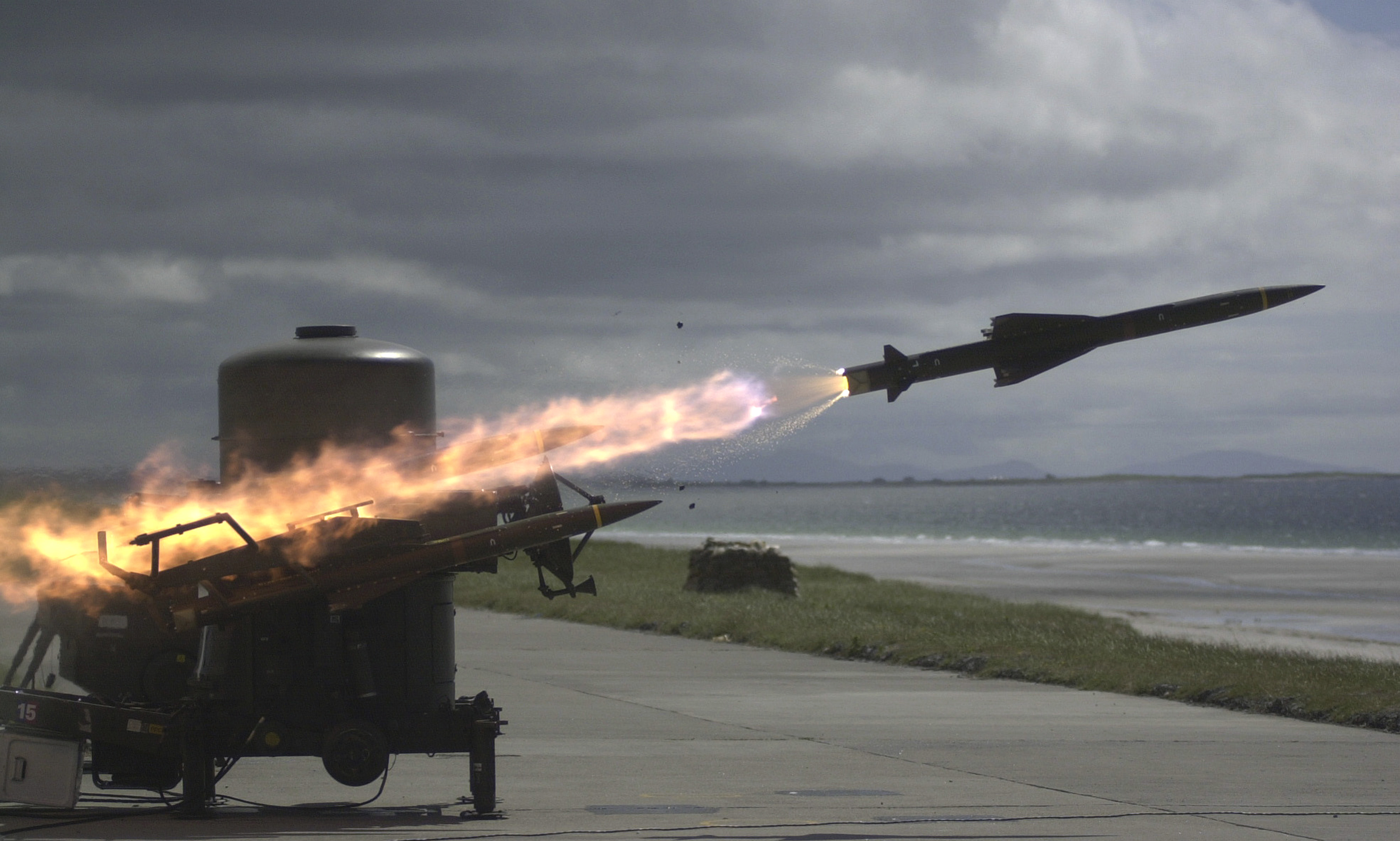
A Rapier missile speeds towards its target during a live firing exercise.

It moved to Rapier Barracks, Kirton-in-Lindsay in August 1972. From July 1973, 9 (Plassey) Battery of the regiment began trials with the Rapier anti-aircraft missile and by September 1975 the regiment was back in Germany fully equipped with the new system. It returned to Rapier Barracks in May 1981 and was there when the Falklands War broke out. 9 Battery was dispatched to the South Atlantic to take part in the conflict. It was back in Germany in January 1985, by now equipped with Tracked Rapier. From there, it deployed to the Gulf in January 1991 to take part in the Gulf War.

It returned to England in 2009 and has been based at Baker Barracks, Thorney Island, West Sussex since then.

=== Current status ===
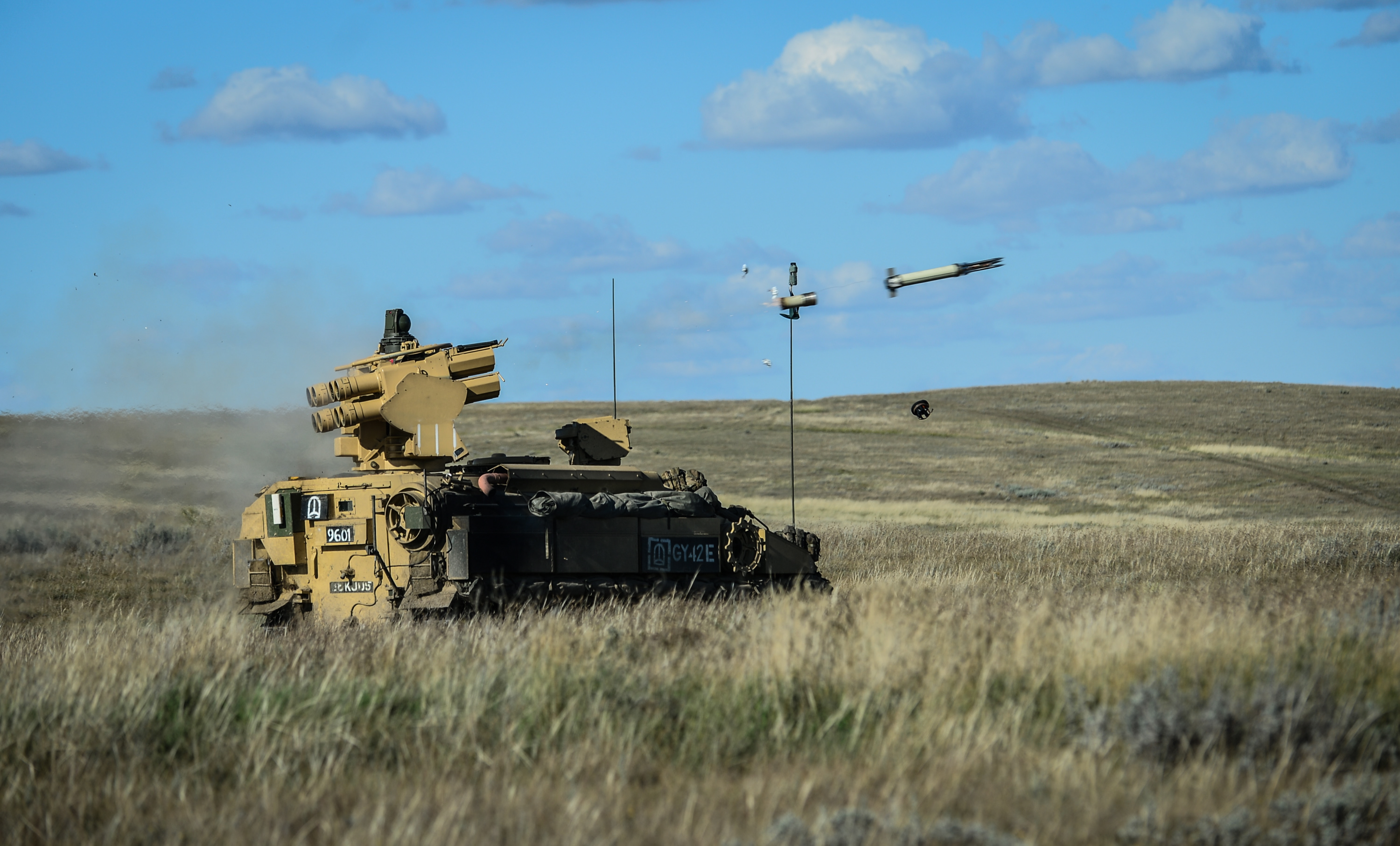
Stormer firing a Starstreak anti-aircraft missile.

Under Army 2020 plans, 12th Regiment was reorganised. It is equipped with Starstreak Surface-to-air missiles mounted on Stormer armoured vehicles.

== See also ==
- British Army
- Royal Artillery
- Royal Horse Artillery
- Bengal Army

== Bibliography ==
- Becke, Archibald F. (1935). Order of Battle of Divisions Part 1–The Regular British Divisions. London: HMSO. OCLC 4405016.
- Clarke, W.G. (1993). Horse Gunners: The Royal Horse Artillery, 200 Years of Panache and Professionalism. Woolwich: The Royal Artillery Institution. ISBN 09520762-0-9.
- Forty, George (1998). British Army Handbook 1939–1945. Stroud, Gloucestershire: Sutton Publishing Limited. ISBN 0-7509-1403-3.
- Frederick, J.B.M. (1984). Lineage Book of British Land Forces 1660–1978. Wakefield, Yorkshire: Microform Academic Publishers. ISBN 1-85117-009-X.
- Joslen, Lt-Col H.F. (1990) [1st. Pub. HMSO:1960]. Orders of Battle, Second World War, 1939–1945. London: London Stamp Exchange. ISBN 0-948130-03-2.
- Kempton, Chris (2003a). 'Loyalty & Honour', The Indian Army September 1939 – August 1947. Vol. Part I Divisions. Milton Keynes: The Military Press. ISBN 0-85420-228-5.
- Kempton, Chris (2003b). 'Loyalty & Honour', The Indian Army September 1939 – August 1947. Vol. Part II Brigades. Milton Keynes: The Military Press. ISBN 0-85420-238-2.
- Order of Battle of the British Armies in France, November 11th, 1918. France: General Staff, GHQ. 1918.
