= Omichund =

Indian merchant and diplomat (died 1767)

Omichund ਆਮਿਰ ਚੰਦ উমিচাঁদ
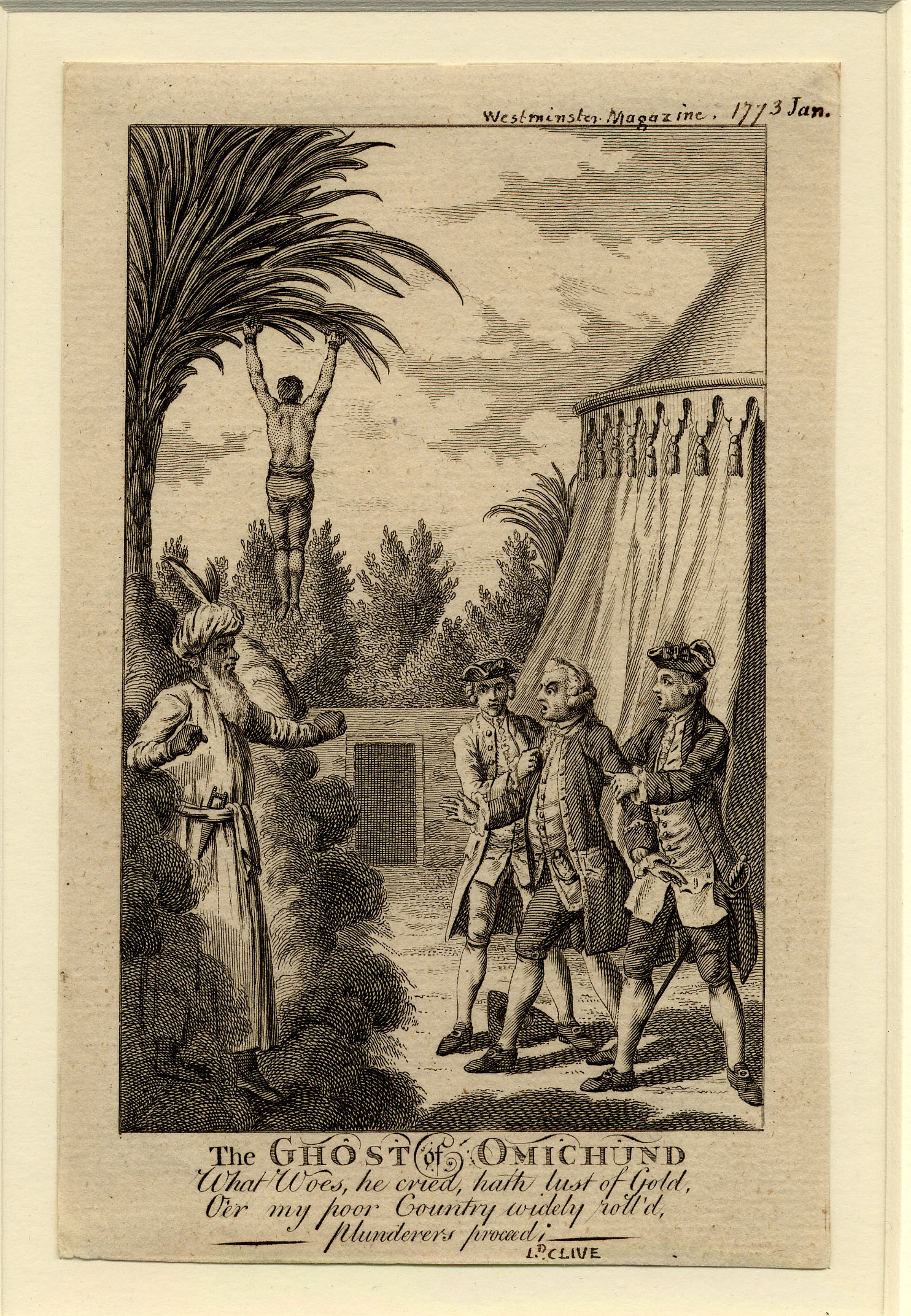
- The Ghost of Omichund, January 1773 engraving
- Born: Amir Chand; Akbarabad, Mughal Empire (now Agra, India)
- Died: 1767; Calcutta, Bengal Presidency, Company Raj (now Kolkata, West Bengal, India)

Omichund, Omichand, or Umichand (Punjabi: ਆਮਿਰ ਚੰਦ, Bengali: উমিচাঁদ; died 1767) was a merchant and broker during the Nawabi period of Bengal. He was one of the principal authors of the conspiracy against Siraj-ud-Daulah and associated with the treaty negotiated by Robert Clive before the Battle of Plassey in 1757.

== Biography ==
Omichand's actual name was Amir Chand and he was from a Punjabi Khatri Sikh background. He had long been resident at Calcutta (Kolkata), where he had acquired a large fortune by providing the investment for the British East India Company, and also by acting as intermediary between the English and the local court at Murshidabad. In a letter of William Watts of later date, he is represented as saying to the Nawab (Siraj ud-Daulah):

He had lived under the English protection these forty years; that he never knew them once to break their agreement, to the truth of which he took his oath, by touching a Brahman's foot; and that if a lie could be proved in England upon any one, they were spit upon and never trusted.

Several houses owned by him in Calcutta are mentioned in connection with the fighting that preceded the tragedy of the Black Hole in 1756, and it is on record that he suffered heavy financial losses at that time. He had been arrested by the English on suspicion of treachery, but afterwards he was forward in giving help to the fugitives and also valuable advice.

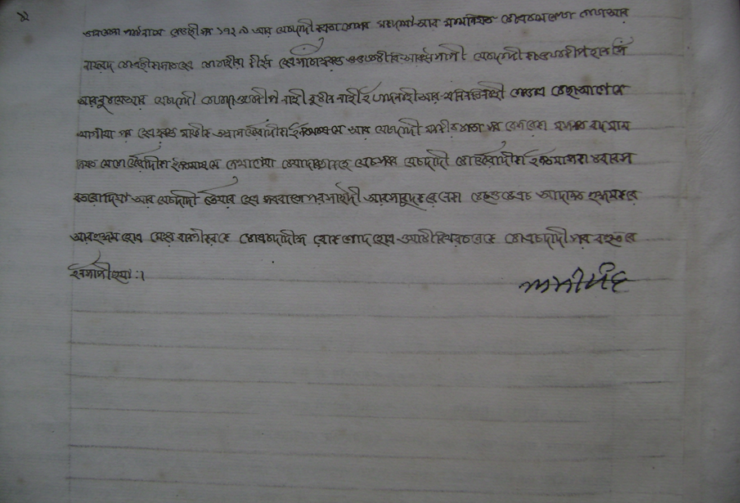
Hindi letter written in Bengali-script by Omichund, circa 18th century

On the recapture of Calcutta, he was sent by Robert Clive to accompany Watts as agent at Murshidabad. It seems to have been through his influence that the nawab gave reluctant consent to Clive's attack on Chandernagore. Later, when the treaty with Mir Jafar was being negotiated circa 1757, he put in a claim for 5% on all the treasure to be recovered, under threat of disclosing the plot. To defeat him, two copies of the treaty were drawn up: the one, the true treaty, omitting his claim; the other containing it, to be shown to him, which Admiral Charles Watson refused to sign, but Clive directed the admiral's signature to be appended. When the truth was revealed to Omichund after Plassey, Macaulay states (following Robert Orme) that he sank gradually into idiocy, languished a few months, and then purportedly died. However, as a matter of fact, he survived for ten years, until 1767; and by his will he bequeathed £2000 to the Foundling Hospital (where his name may be seen in the list of benefactors as "a black merchant of Calcutta") and also to the Magdalen Hospital in London.

Lord Clive testified and defended himself thus before the House of Commons of Parliament on 10 May 1773, during the Parliamentary inquiry into his conduct in India:

Omichund, his confidential servant, as he thought, told his master of an agreement made between the English and Monsieur Duprée [a general of the French East India Company] to attack him, and received for that advice a sum of not less than four lacks of rupees. Finding this to be the man in whom the nabob [nawab] entirely trusted, it soon became our object to consider him as a most material engine in the intended revolution. We therefore made such an agreement as was necessary for the purpose, and entered into a treaty with him to satisfy his demands. When all things were prepared, and the evening of the event was appointed, Omichund informed Mr. Watts, who was at the court of the nabob, that he insisted upon thirty lacks of rupees, and five per cent. upon all the treasure that should be found; that, unless that was immediately complied with, he would disclose the whole to the nabob; and that Mr. Watts, and the two other English gentlemen then at the court, should be cut off before the morning. Mr. Watts, immediately on this information, dispatched an express to me at the council. I did not hesitate to find out a stratagem to save the lives of these people, and secure success to the intended event. For this purpose we signed another treaty. The one was called the Red, the other the White treaty. This treaty was signed by every one, except admiral Watson; and I should have considered myself sufficiently authorised to put his name to it, by the conversation I had with him. As to the person who signed admiral Watson's name to the treaty, whether he did it in his presence or not, I cannot say; but this I know, that he thought he had sufficient authority for so doing. This treaty was immediately sent to Omichund, who did not suspect the stratagem. The event took place, and success attended it; and the House, I am fully persuaded, will agree with me, that, when the very existence of the Company was at stake, and the lives of these people so precariously situated, and so certain of being destroyed, it was a matter of true policy and of justice to deceive so great a villain." –Great Britain Parliament, 1812
