= Ami Sirajer Begum =

Indian Bengali television historical soap opera

- Genre: Period Drama; Romance
- Based on: Ami Sirajer Begam by Sree Parabat
- Directed by: Tathagata Mukherjee
- Starring: Sean Banerjee; Pallavi Dey; Badshah Moitra
- Opening theme: "Ami Sirajer Begum" by Shreya Ghoshal
- Country of origin: India
- Original language: Bengali
- No. of episodes: 125

Production
- Producers: Shrikant Mohta; Mahendra Soni
- Production locations: Kolkata; Mumbai
- Camera setup: Multi-camera
- Running time: 22 minutes
- Production companies: Dag Creative Media; Shree Venkatesh Films

Original release
- Network: Star Jalsha
- Release: 10 December 2018 – 17 May 2019

Ami Sirajer Begum is an Indian Bengali television historical soap opera that ran from December 2018 to May 2019 on Bengali General Entertainment Channel Star Jalsha. The show was produced under the banner of Dag Creative Media and SVF group. The show was based on a novel by Sree Parabat about the life of 17th century Bengali ruler Siraj ud-Daulah and his wife Lutfunnisa Begum. The roles of Siraj and Lutfa were played by Sean Banerjee and Pallavi Dey.

== Synopsis ==
The story is set against the backdrop of 18th century Bengal when Nabab Siraj ud-Daulah, the last independent ruler of the kingdom of Bengal, sat on the throne succeeding his maternal grandfather Nawab Alivardi Khan. As a ruler. he faced political tension, aggression from the English, betrayal of close relatives (like his elder maternal aunt Ghaseti Begum) and his chief military advisor Mir Jafar, and various other struggles. The show is a fictionalised account of how Siraj ud-Daulah falls in love with the maid Lutfa who became his wife, Begum Lutfunnisa, and how she stands by the Nabab as his main support.

== Cast ==
=== Main ===
- Sean Banerjee as Nawab Siraj-Ud-Daulah aka Siraj
- Pallavi Dey as Lutfunnisa Begum aka Lutfa

=== Recurring ===
Nawab Family

- Chandrayee Ghosh as Ghaseti Begum
- Sohan Bandopadhyay as Alivardi Khan
- Tulika Basu as Sharf-un-Nisa Begum
- Mallika Majumdar as Amina Begum
- Sreetoma Roy Chowdhury as Zebunnisha
- Nisha Poddar as Umdadunnissa Bahu Begum
- Ayendri Lavnia Roy as Shehzadi Afseen Begum
- Mohana Meem as Begum Gulshanara
- Ananda Chaudhury as Shaukat Jung
- Arghya Mukherjee as Zain ud-Din Ahmed Khan
- Mahua Mitra as Maimuna Begum
- Ananya Guha as Hadiyah

Employee of Nawab family

- Amitava Das as Amatya Mohanlal Kashmiri
- Mouli Dutta as Sofia
- Sayak Chakraborty as Asrafi
- Laboni Bhattacharjee as Haseena
- Sanghasri Sinha Mitra as Rabeya
- Rupa Bhattacharjee as Hamida

Conspirators of Plassey Battle

- Badshah Moitra as Mir Jafar
- Rajesh Chattopadhyay as Omichund
- Anirban Bhattacharya as Rajballav
- Sandip Dey as Ray Durlobh
- Debdut Ghosh as Jagat Sheth
- Saurav Das as Major William Watts
- Biman Chakrabarty as Muhammadi Beg

=== Others ===
- Brata Basu as Mansur Darbesh
- Atri Bhattacharya as Rupchand
- Mithai Sarkar
- Sudip Mukherjee as Bhaskar Pandit
- Pallavi Mukherjee as Faizi Bai
- Dronn Mukherjee as Roshanlal
- Samir Biswas as Romakanta
- Anindya Sarkar as Iraj Darbesh
