= Lutfunnisa Begum =

3rd wife of Siraj-Ud-Daulah

Lutfunnisa
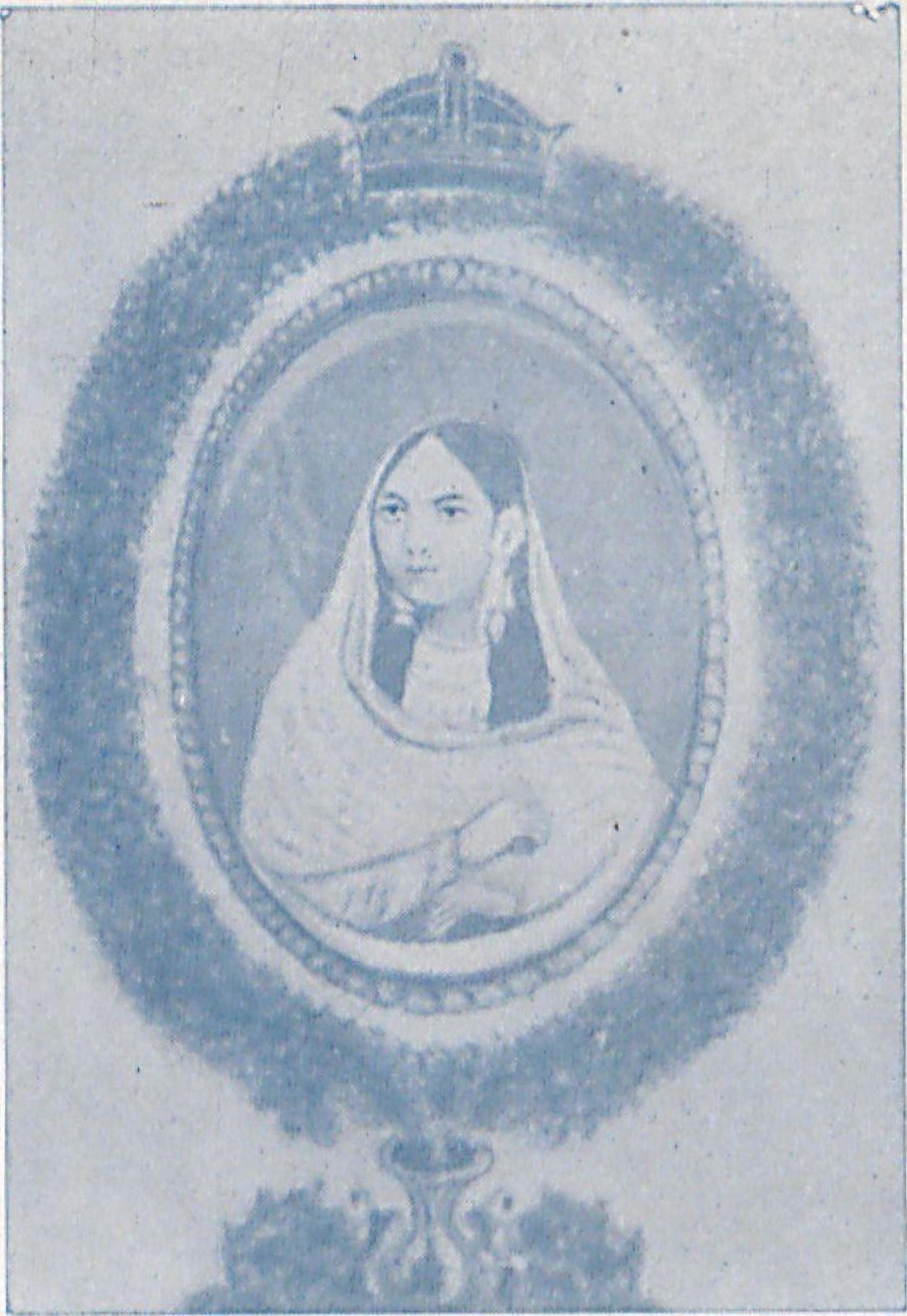
- Portrait of Lutfunissa from Banglar Begum (1912)

Primary Consort of the Nawab of Bengal, Bihar and Orissa
- Tenure: 9 April 1756 – 23 June 1757
- Born: 18 July 1740; Dacca, Bengal Subah
- Died: 10 November 1790 (aged 50); Murshidabad, Bengal Presidency, Company Raj
- Burial: 11 November 1790; Khushbagh, Bengal Presidency, Company Raj
- Spouse: Siraj ud-Daulah
- Issue: Qudsia Begum Sahiba (Umme-Zehra)
Names
- Begum Nawabjadi Lutfunnissa Khan Chowdhurani
- House: Hirajheel Palace
- Father: Iraj Khan
- Mother: Parbati Das

Lutfunnisa Begum (Persian: لطف النساء بیگم, Bengali: বেগম লুৎফুন্নেসা; (18 July 1740 – 10 November 1790) was the 3rd wife and primary consort of Siraj ud-Daulah, the last independent Nawab of Bengal (the ruler of the Bengal Subah).

== Early life ==
Lutfunnisa, who served Begum Sharifun nissa, Siraj ud-Daulah's maternal grandmother. Siraj was infatuated with the beauty of Rajkunwari and asked his grandmother to give her to him. Begum Sharifun nissa complied and he renamed her Lutfunnisa Begum. By this point, Siraj had already married two other wives: Begum Zaibunissa and Umdatunnisa Bahu Begum.

== Life after marriage ==
Lutfunnisa gave birth to a daughter, Umme Zohra Begum, who was Siraj's firstborn child. In 1748, Siraj's father, Zain ud-Din Ahmed Khan, was killed by Afghan rebels headed by Mustafar Khan. Siraj was also appointed to his father's former position of Naib Nazim of Bihar. During this time, Lufunnisa Begum became his primary consort. After the Battle of Plassey, which saw the British East India Company defeat Siraj and his French allies, Lutfunnisa escaped the palace with him and their daughter. Accompanying them was a trusted eunuch. On 24 June 1757, they made their escape. They were soon captured and brought back to Murshidabad by Mir Jafar, the new nawab allied with the British.

Siraj-ud-Daulah was executed on 2 July 1757 in Murshidabad. Mir Qasim, the son-in-law of Mir Jafar, tortured Lutfunnisa to discover the locations of the family jewels. Soon after the killing of Siraj, all of the women of the house of his maternal grandfather, Alivardi Khan, were either poisoned or rowed out into the centre of the Hooghly river and drowned by sinking of their boat. The only ones who were spared were Lutfunnisa and her daughter, who in 1758, were exiled to Dhaka and imprisoned in Jinjira Palace. She was confined there for seven years during which time Mir Jafar and his son each asked for her hand in marriage. She refused, stating, "having ridden an elephant before, I cannot now agree to ride an ass".

She was released from Jinjira Palace in 1765 and was allowed back to Murshidabad. The British East India company allowed the creation of a pension for her and her daughter. The latter, Umme Zohra Begum, was married to Mir Asad Ali Khan Murad ud-Doulah, the nephew of Siraj, son of Mirza Mehedi Ekram ud-Doulah and later nawab of Dhaka. After her marriage, Umme Zohra Begum was renamed as Qudsiyah Begum Sahiba. They would give Lufunnisa four grandchildren, whom she raised after the death of first her son-in-law and then her daughter in 1774. In March 1787, she petitioned the British East India Company to increase her pension so to meet the additional cost of four grandchildren. The company refused the increase. The Estate of the Nawab of Bengal still paid for the upkeep of Lufunnisa's father-in-law's grave, which was managed by her. Lutfunnesa would personally visit the mausoleum in the afternoon with recitations from the Quran every day and light candles there.

== Death ==
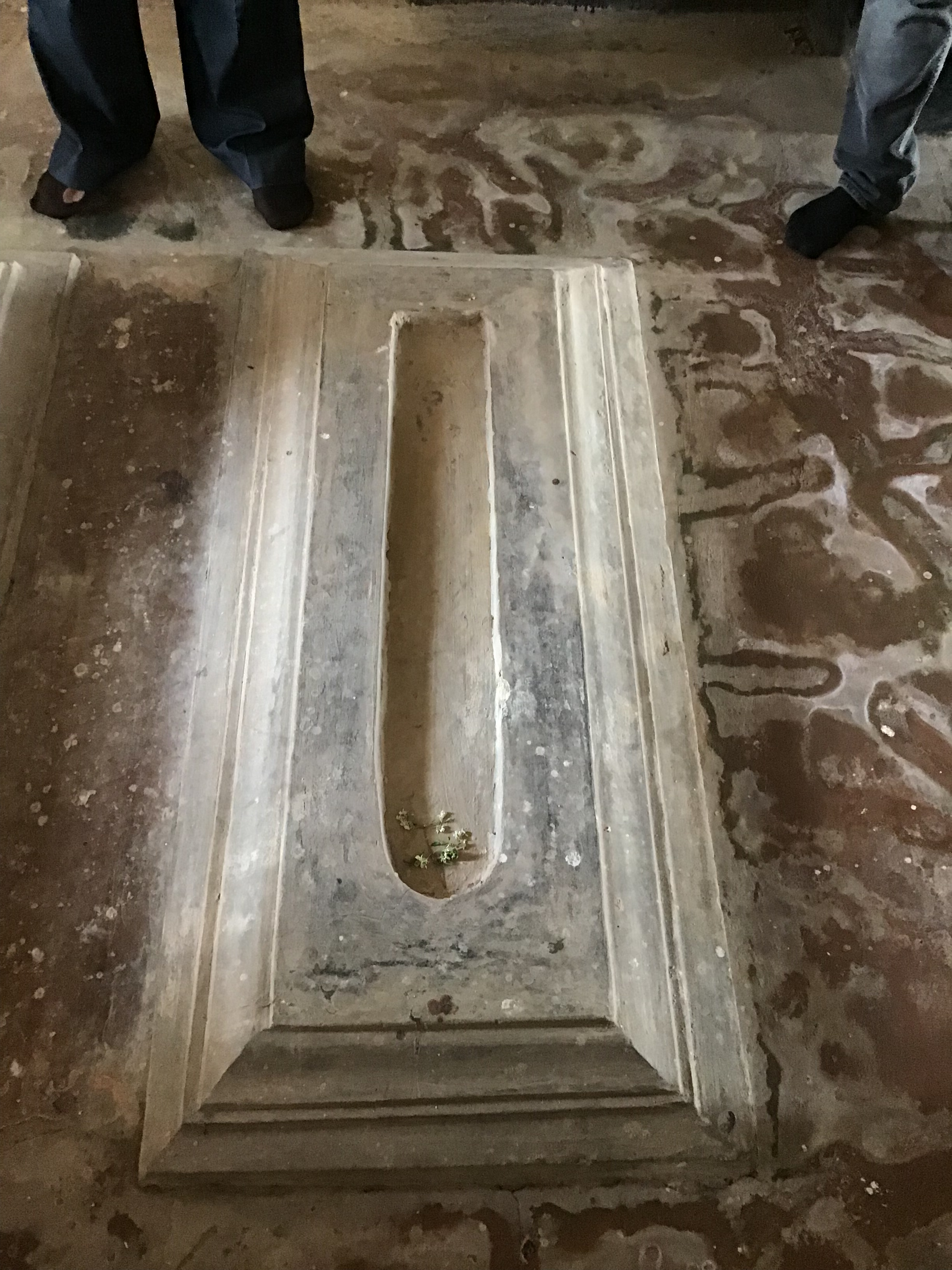
Lutfunnisa tomb in Khosbag

Lufunnisa died on 10 November 1790. She was buried in Khushbagh by the side of her husband.

== In popular culture ==
In 1960 the Indian novelist Sree Parabat published a novel, Ami Sirajer Begum, about the life of Lutfunnisa and Siraj-ud-Daulah.

In the 1973 Indian Bengali historical film Ami Sirajer Begam, directed by Sushil Mukhopadhya based on Sree Parabat's aforementioned novel, Lutfunnisa was portrayed by Bengali actress Sandhya Roy.

In 2018–19 an historical soap opera based on the novel, and also called Ami Sirajer Begum, was broadcast on Star Jalsha, in which Lutfunnisa was portrayed by Pallavi Dey.
