= Siraj ud Daula College =

College in Karachi, Pakistan

Siraj ud Daula College (Urdu: سراج الدولہ کالج) is located in FC Area (Federal B.Area) of Karachi, Sindh, Pakistan. It is affiliated with the University of Karachi. The college offers undergraduate Bachelor of Commerce, the degree is offered in Commonwealths nations. The curriculum is usually concentrated on one subject area — such as accounting, actuarial science, business management, corporate governance, human resource management, economics, statistics, finance, marketing or supply chain management — and emphasizes underlying theory.

It is named after Nawab Siraj ud-Daulah who was the last independent Nawab of Bengal.

== See also ==
- Adamjee Government Science College
