= Mohanlal (Dewan) =

Diwan of Nawab Siraj Ud Daulah

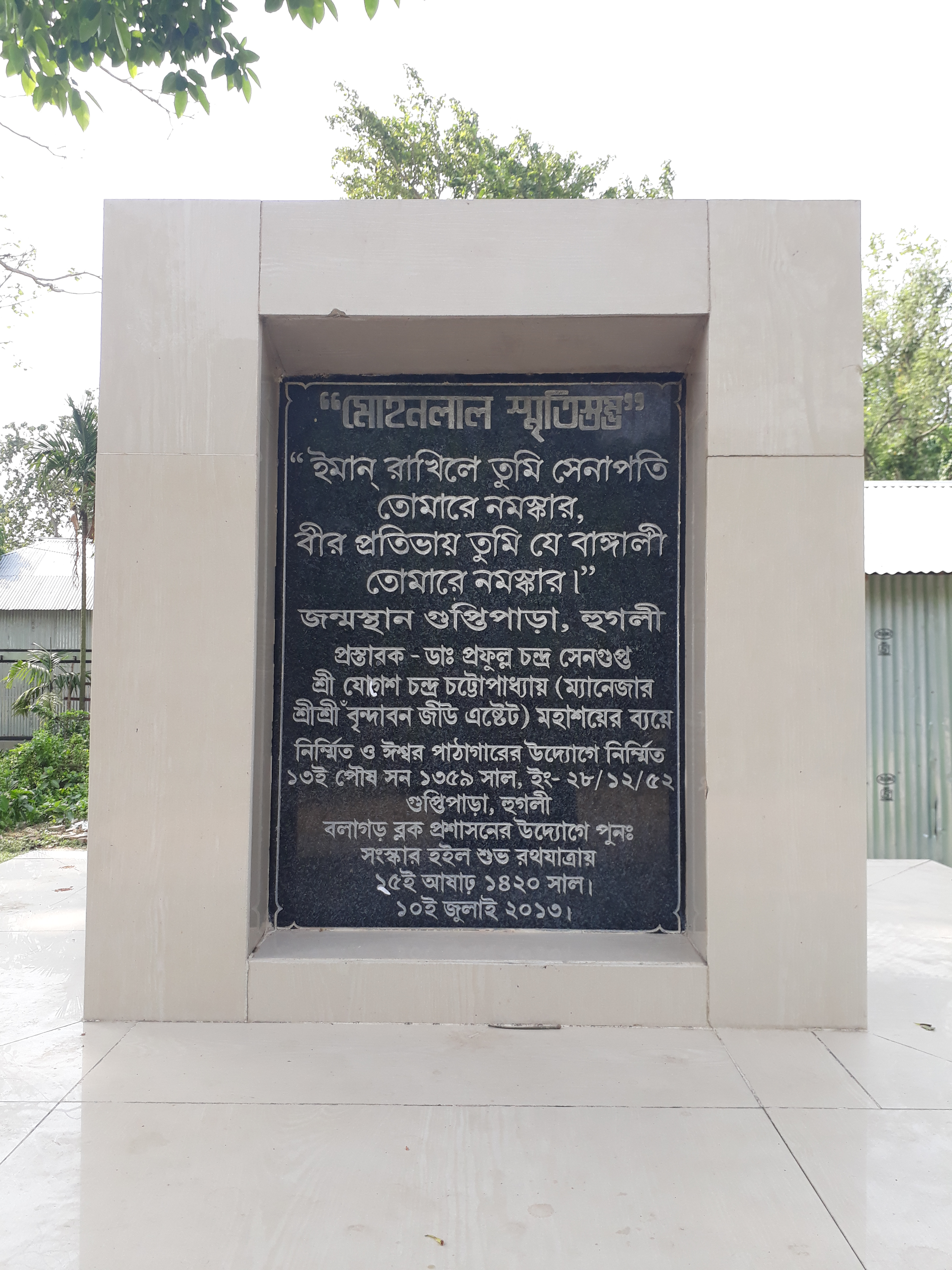
Memorial of Diwan Mohanlal, in Guptipara, Hooghly.

Dewan Mohanlal of Purnia (Bengali: মোহনলাল) was a Hindu dewan serving under Siraj ud-Daulah, the Nawab of Bengal, at Murshidabad.

== Career ==
It is claimed by few historian that he was born in Purnea. His appointment was controversial due to his religion; The Nawab's decision of elevating Mohanlal to the prominent position of his supreme Diwan caused the Muslim nobility, and in particular Mir Jafar, to take great offense. Mir Jafar was then the head of the armed forces, second only to the Nawab, and the elevation of a Hindu to a post above him was taken almost as a personal insult. He became one of the powerful vassal king of Purnea, when Ali Vardi Khan took the chair of Deputy Governor of Bihar in 1733. He was the close friend of Jainuddin Ahmed, son-in-law of Alivardi Khan. On the other hand, some historians also claimed that Mohanlal was born at Guptipara in Hooghly district.

In 1752 Alivardi Khan appointed him as one of the general and allotted a house at Kalandarbag, Murshidabad. Siraj took the chair of Nawab on 15 April 1756 and Mohan Lal was appointed Peskar. On 23 June 1757 in the Battle of Plassey, Siraj ud-Daulah faced off against the British, apparently with overwhelming force, but at the critical time Mir Jafar's men stood watching passively while the soldiers of Siraj ud-Daulah were decimated by the smaller, but much better armed British forces. In the said battle Mohan Lal and his fellow leader Mir Madan fought on the side of the Nawab's Army. After the death of Mir Madan, he wanted to attack the British army rapidly and advised Siraj ud-Daulah that the decision of retreat may be fatal for the Nawab. But the Nawab was already misguided by Mir Jafar did not consider Mohanlal's opinion.

== Family ==
Narottam Halder mentioned according to some scholars Mohanlal belonged to a Hindu Mahishya Family. Thakur Sree Sree Anukulchandra also mentioned that Mohanlal belonged to a Hindu Mahishya family. Raja Mohanlal married Nawab Siraj ud-Daulah's younger sister Shahzadi Afseen Begum; they had two sons and a daughter: Raja Sreemant Lal, Hukka Lal and Galibunnessa. Mohanlal's son-in-law Bahadur Ali Khan was killed on 23 June, 1757 in the Battle of Plassey. His elder son Raja Srimanta Lal of Purnea was killed by order of Miran, son of Nawab Mir Jafar.

== In popular culture ==
Mohanlal has been portrayed as a great patriot and the most trusted lieutenant of the nawab in the famous Bangladeshi movie Sirajud Daulah as well as in Indian movie Ami Sirajer Begam. Bengali poet Nabinchandra Sen also symbolized his heroic resistance in his poem Palashir Juddho and in the drama of Sachindranath Sengupta Sirajudullah.

== Myth ==
It was stated that after the defeat of the battle of Plassey he fled to Mymensingh to save Siraj's child from the henchmen of Mir Miran. Later he took shelter in different places of Bengal such as Juranpur Satipith at Juranpur village, a Shakta pitha of Nadia district and Brindabanchandra Mandir at Guptipara, Hooghly.

== Books ==
- "Riyazu-s-salatin", A History of Bengal, Ghulam Husain Salim (translated from the Persian): viewable online at the Packard Humanities Institute
- Mir Jafar in the Banglapedia

== Notes ==
1. "Riyazu-s-salatin", Ghulam Husain Salim - a reference to the appointment of Mohanlal can be found here
