= Siraj-ud-Daulah =

Last independent Nawab (ruler) of Bengal from 1756 to 1757

- Mansur-ul-Mulk (Victory of the Country); Siraj ud-Daulah (Light of the State); Hybut Jang (Horror in War); Nawab of Bengal
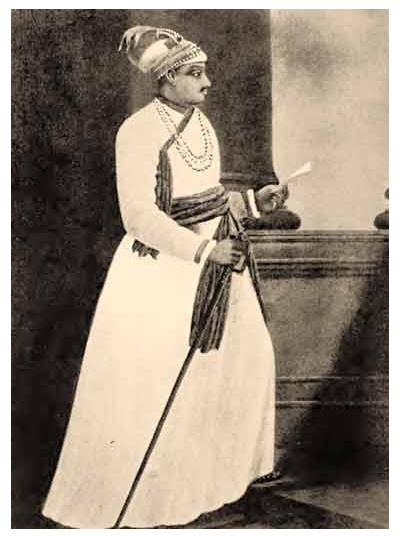

Nawab Nazim of Bengal and Bihar
- Reign: 9 April 1756 – 23 June 1757
- Predecessor: Alivardi Khan
- Successor: Mir Jafar
- Born: Mirza Muhammad Siraj-ud-Daulah; 1733; Murshidabad, Bengal
- Died: 2 July 1757 (aged 23–24); Murshidabad, Bengal
- Burial: Khushbagh, West Bengal
- Spouse: Lutfunnisa Begum; Zaibunnisa Begum; Umdadunnisa Begum; Aleya Begum (probably)
- Issue: Umme Zohra (Qudsia Begum)
- Tribe: Afsharid
- Father: Zain ud-Din Ahmed Khan
- Mother: Amina Begum
- Religion: Shia Islam
- Military career
- Allegiance: Bengal Subah
- Rank: Nawab Bahadur; Badshah
- Conflicts: Maratha invasions of Bengal; Battle of Plassey; Siege of Calcutta; Capture of Fort William

Mirza Muhammad Siraj-ud-Daulah (Note: Persian: میر سید جعفر علی خان میرزا محمد سراج الدوله; Bengali: মীর সৈয়দ জাফর আলী খান মির্জা মুহম্মদ সিরাজ উদ্দৌলা) (1733 – 2 July 1757), commonly known as Siraj-ud-Daulah (Note: Persian: سراج الدوله; Bengali: সিরাজ-উদ-দৌলা) (Note: Other spellings exist including the corruption "Sir Roger Dowler" which is also used in phrases such as "Sir Roger Dowler method" referring to early non-systematic and distorting Romanisation schemes for Devanagari script.) or Siraj ud-Daula, was the last independent Nawab of the Bengal Subah. The end of his reign marked the start of the rule of the East India Company over Bengal and later almost all of the Indian subcontinent.

Siraj succeeded his maternal grandfather, Alivardi Khan as the Nawab of Bengal in April 1756 at the age of 23. Betrayed by Jogot Shet, Raybollob, Umichad, Lokkonshen Mir Jafar, the commander of Nawab's army, Siraj lost the Battle of Plassey on 23 June 1757. The forces of the East India Company under Robert Clive invaded and the administration of Bengal fell into the hands of the company.

== Early life and background ==
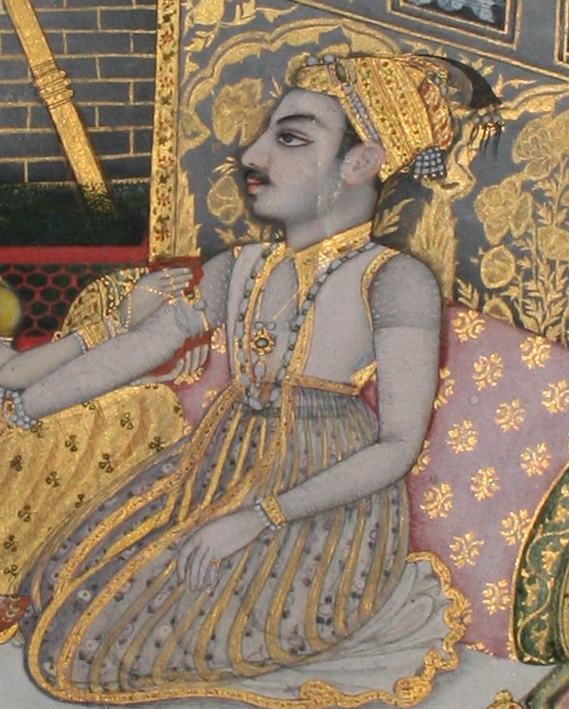
Painting of Siraj ud Daula

Siraj was born to the family of Mirza Muhammad Hashim and Amina Begum in 1733. Amina Begum was the youngest daughter of Alivardi Khan and Princess Sharfunnisa, the paternal aunt of Mir Jafar. His father, Mirza Muhammad Hashim was the youngest son of Haji Ahmad, the elder brother of Alivardi Khan. Siraj's great-grandfather was Mirza Muhammad Madani, who was of either of Arab or Turkic ancestry, the son of a foster-brother of the Mughal emperor Aurangzeb; Madani himself began his career as a cup-bearer under the latter's son Azam Shah. His great-grandmother belonged to the Turkic Afshar tribe of Khorasan. Through her, he was a grandnephew of Shuja-ud-Din Muhammad Khan, the two having shared a common ancestor in Nawab Aqil Khan.

He was raised at the Nawab's palace with all necessary education and training suitable for a future Nawab. Young Siraj also accompanied Alivardi on his military ventures against the Marathas in 1746. In 1750, Siraj revolted against his grandfather and seized Patna, but quickly surrendered and was forgiven.

== Reign as Nawab ==
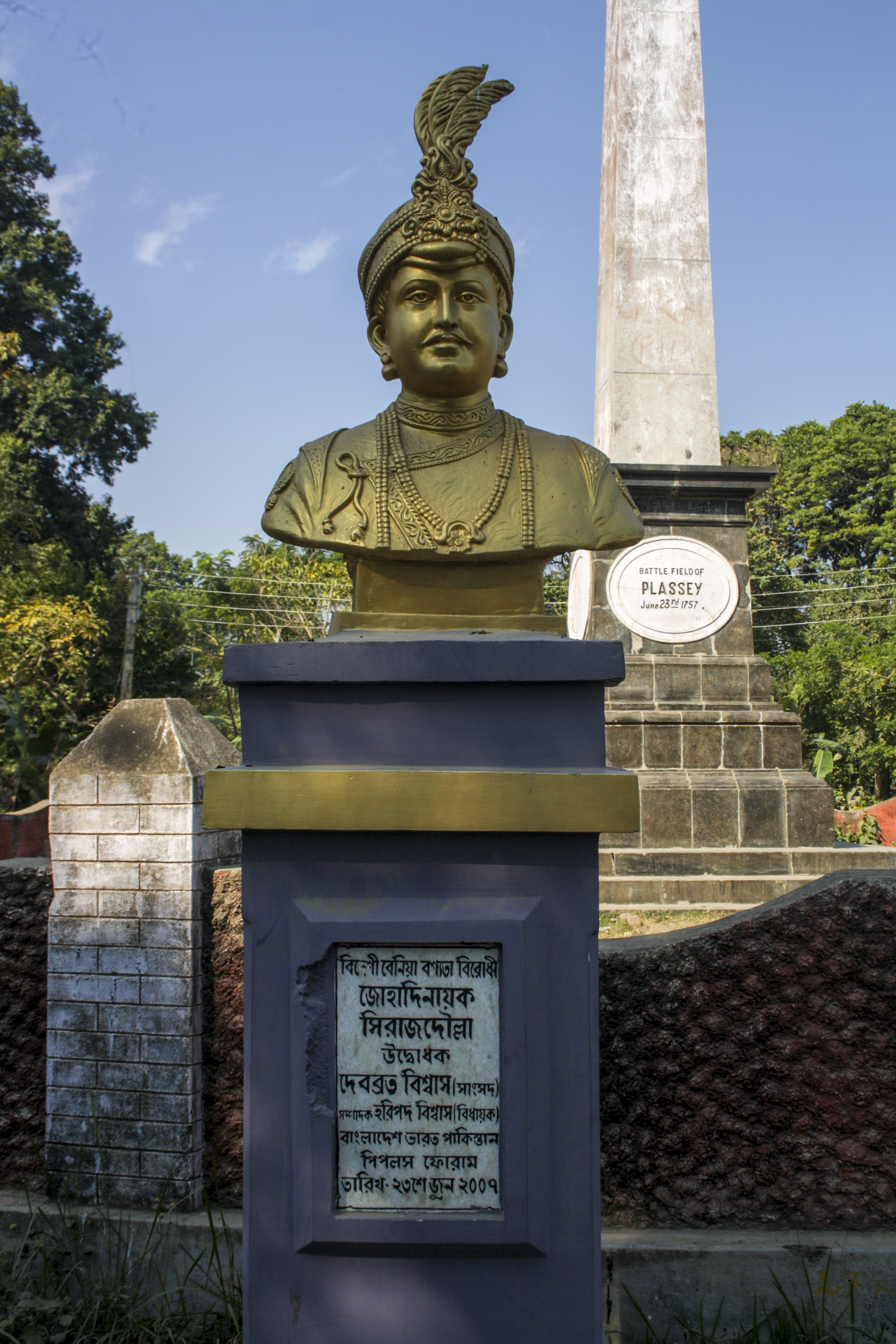
Bust of Siraj ud-Daulah by the Palashi Monument situated in Nadia, West Bengal.

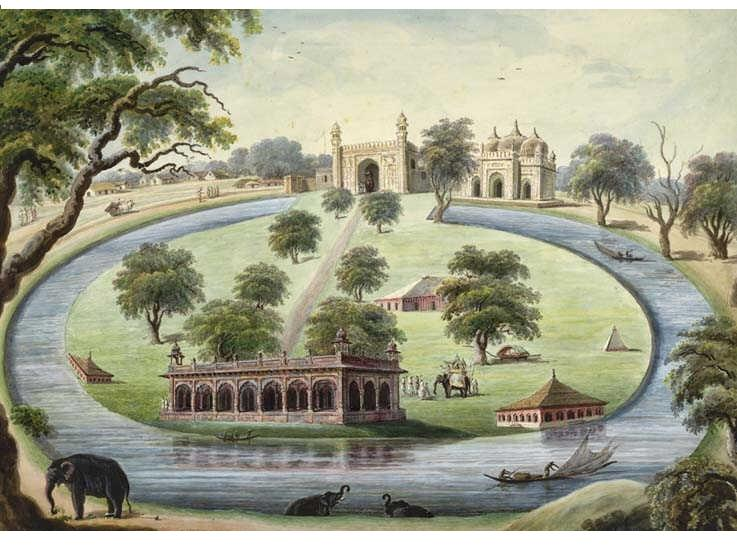
A painting showing the Sang-i-dalan, Kala Masjid, the tombs all surrounded by the Motijhil Lake

Siraj ud-Daulah's nomination to the Nawabship aroused the jealousy and enmity of his maternal aunt, Ghaseti Begum (Mehar un-Nisa Begum), Mir Jafar, Jagat Seth (Mehtab Chand) and Shaukat Jang (Siraj's cousin). Ghaseti Begum possessed huge wealth, which was the source of her influence and strength. Apprehending serious opposition from her, Siraj ud-Daulah seized her wealth from Motijheel Palace and placed her under confinement. The Nawab also made changes in high government positions by giving them to his own favourites. Mir Madan was appointed Bakshi (paymaster of the army) in place of Mir Jafar. Mohanlal was elevated to the rank of peshkar (courtclerk) of his Dewan-khane and he exercised great influence in the administration. Eventually, Siraj suppressed Shaukat Jang, governor of Purnia, who was killed in a clash.

=== Black Hole of Calcutta ===
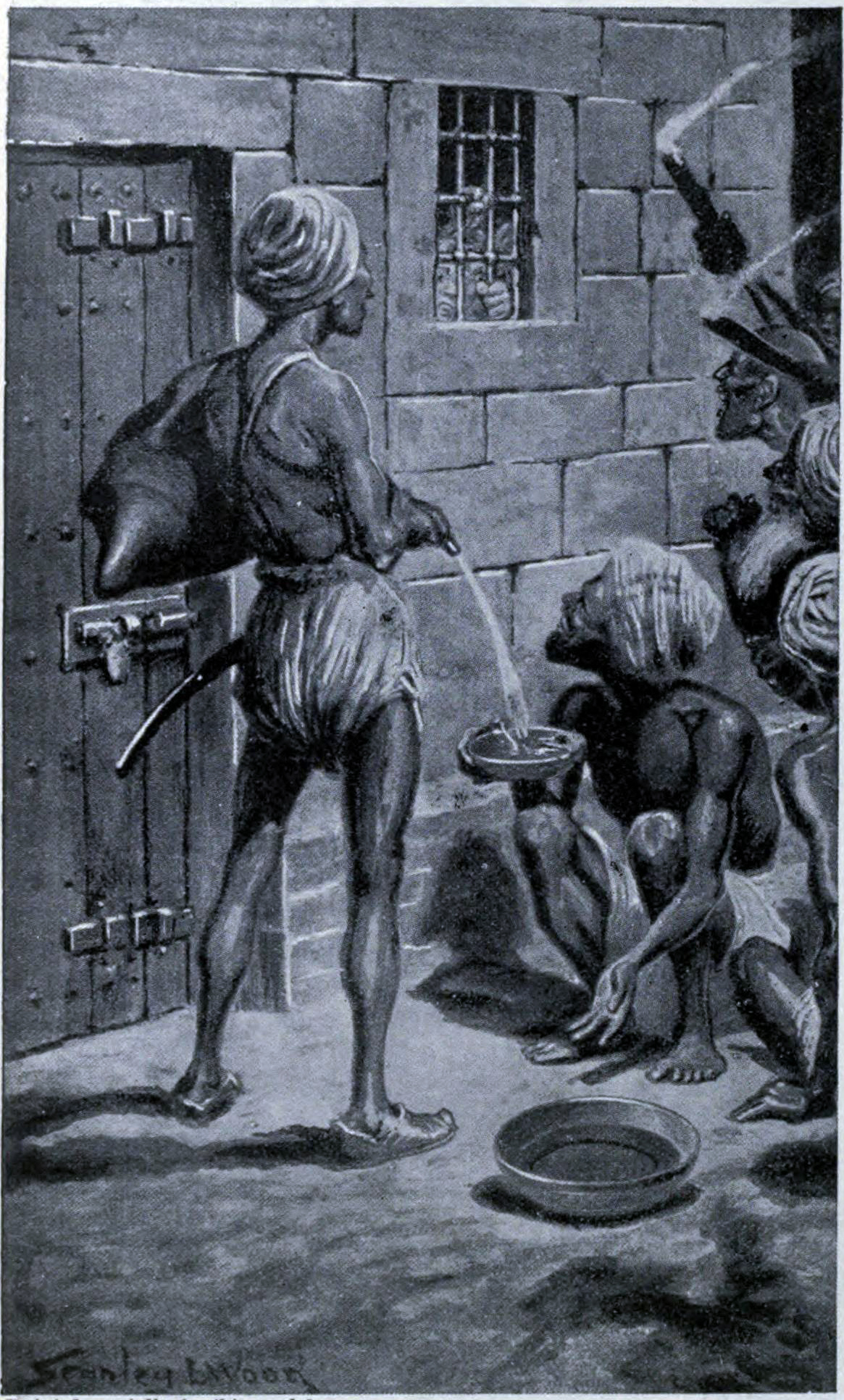
Illustration of pindaris who were loyal to Siraj ud-Daulah carry out the Black Hole of Calcutta atrocity, 20 June 1756.

During this period, the British East India Company was increasing their influence in the Indian subcontinent, particularly in Bengal; Siraj soon grew to resent the politico-military presence of the East India Company in Bengal. In particular, he was angered at the Company's alleged involvement with and instigation of some members of his own court to a conspiracy to oust him. His charges against the company were broadly threefold. Firstly, that they strengthened the fortification around the Fort William without any intimation or approval; secondly, that they grossly abused trade privileges granted them by the Mughal rulers – which caused heavy loss of customs duties for the government; and thirdly, that they gave shelter to some of his officers, for example, Krishnadas, son of Rajballav, who fled Dhaka after misappropriating government funds. Hence, when the East India Company began further enhancement of military strength at Fort William in Calcutta, Siraj ud-Daulah ordered them to stop. The Company did not heed his directives; consequently, Siraj retaliated and captured Calcutta (for a short while renamed Alinagar) from the British in June 1756. The Nawab gathered his forces together and took Fort William. The British captives were placed in the prison cell as a temporary holding by a local commander, but there was confusion in the Indian chain of command, and the captives were left there overnight, and many of them died.

Sir William Meredith, during the Parliamentary inquiry into Robert Clive's actions in India, vindicated Siraj ud-Daulah of any charge surrounding the Black Hole incident: "A peace was however agreed upon with Surajah Dowlah; and the persons who went as ambassadors to confirm that peace formed the conspiracy, by which he was deprived of his kingdom and his life."

=== Nizamat Imambara ===
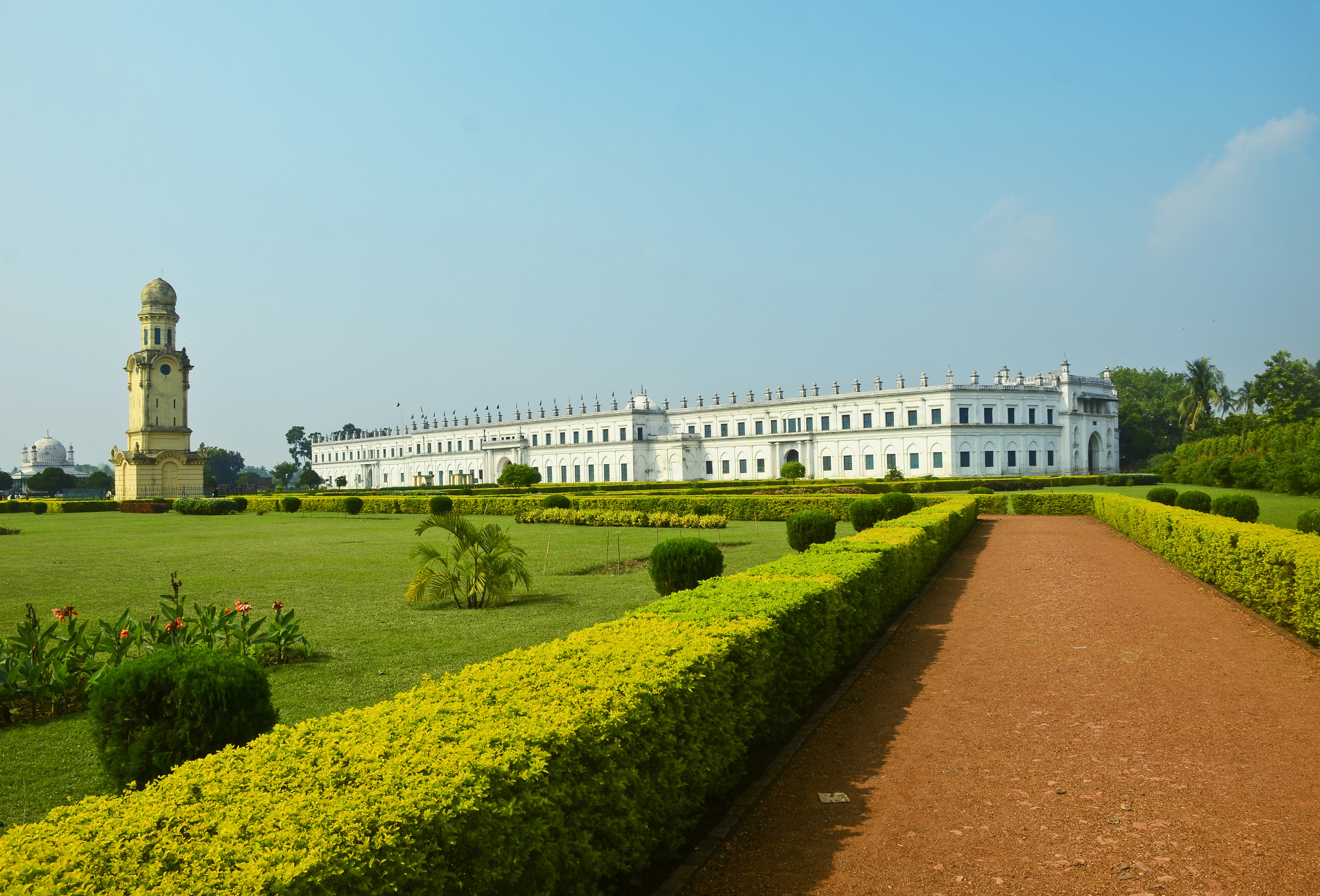
Nizammat Imambara of Murshidabad was built by Siraj ud-Daula. It is the biggest imambargah in the Subcontinent.

Shia Islam was introduced to Bengal during the governorship of Shah Shuja (1641–1661 AD), son of Shah Jahan. From 1707 AD to 1880 AD, the Nawabs of Bengal were Shias. They built huge imambaras (Shia houses of worship), including the biggest of the Subcontinent built by Nawab Siraj-ud Daula, the Nizammat Imambara in the political capital Murshidabad. It and other imambaras built in towns such as the trading hub Hoogly attracted Shia scholars from within and outside India.

=== British Conspiracy ===
The Nawab was infuriated on learning of the attack on Chandernagar. His former hatred of the British returned, but he now felt the need to strengthen himself by alliances against the British. The Nawab was plagued by fear of attack from the north by the Afghans under Ahmad Shah Durrani and from the west by the Marathas. Therefore, he could not deploy his entire force against the British for fear of being attacked from the flanks. A deep distrust set in between the British and the Nawab. As a result, Siraj started secret negotiations with Jean Law, chief of the French factory at Cossimbazar, and de Bussy. The Nawab also moved a large division of his army under Rai Durlabh to Plassey, on the island of Cossimbazar 30 miles (48 km) south of Murshidabad.

Popular discontent against the Nawab flourished in his own court. The Seths, the traders of Bengal, were in perpetual fear for their wealth under the reign of Siraj, contrary to the situation under Alivardi's reign. They had engaged Yar Lutuf Khan to defend them in case they were threatened in any way. William Watts, the Company representative at the court of Siraj, informed Clive about a conspiracy at the court to overthrow the ruler. The conspirators included Mir Jafar, the paymaster of the army, Rai Durlabh, Yar Lutuf Khan and Omichund (Amir Chand), a Sikh merchant, Jagat Seth, Krishna Chandra, and several officers in the army. When communicated in this regard by Mir Jafar, Clive referred it to the select committee in Calcutta on 1 May. The committee passed a resolution in support of the alliance. A treaty was drawn up between the British and Mir Jafar to raise him to the throne of the Nawab in return for support to the British in the field of battle and the bestowal of large sums of money upon them as compensation for the attack on Calcutta. On 2 May, Clive broke up his camp and sent half the troops to Calcutta and the other half to Chandernagar.

Mir Jafar and the Seths desired that the confederacy between the British and himself be kept secret from Omichund, but when he found out about it, he threatened to betray the conspiracy if his share was not increased to three million rupees (£300,000). Hearing of this, Clive suggested an expedient to the committee. He suggested that two treaties be drawn – the real one on white paper, containing no reference to Omichund and the other on red paper, containing Omichund's desired stipulation, to deceive him. The Members of the Committee signed on both treaties, but Admiral Watson signed only the real one and his signature had to be counterfeited on the fictitious one. Both treaties and separate articles for donations to the army, navy squadron and committee were signed by Mir Jafar on 4 June.

Lord Clive testified and defended himself thus before the House of Commons of Parliament on 10 May 1773, during the Parliamentary inquiry into his conduct in India:

"Omichund, his confidential servant, as he thought, told his master of an agreement made between the English and Monsieur Duprée [may be a mistranscription of Dupleix] to attack him, and received for that advice a sum of not less than four lacks of rupees. Finding this to be the man in whom the nawab entirely trusted, it soon became our object to consider him as a most material engine in the intended revolution. We, therefore, made such an agreement as was necessary for the purpose, and entered into a treaty with him to satisfy his demands. When all things were prepared, and the evening of the event was appointed, Omichund informed Mr Watts, who was at the court of the nawab, that he insisted upon thirty lacks of rupees, and five per cent. upon all the treasure that should be found; that, unless that was immediately complied with, he would disclose the whole to the nawab; and that Mr. Watts, and the two other English gentlemen then at the court, should be cut off before the morning. Mr Watts, immediately on this information, dispatched an express to me at the council. I did not hesitate to find out a stratagem to save the lives of these people, and secure success to the intended event. For this purpose, we signed another treaty. The one was called the Red, the other the White treaty. This treaty was signed by everyone, except admiral Watson; and I should have considered myself sufficiently authorised to put his name to it, by the conversation I had with him. As to the person who signed Admiral Watson's name to the treaty, whether he did it in his presence or not, I cannot say; but this I know, that he thought he had sufficient authority for so doing. This treaty was immediately sent to Omichund, who did not suspect the stratagem. The event took place, and success attended it; and the House, I am fully persuaded, will agree with me, that, when the very existence of the company was at stake, and the lives of these people so precariously situated, and so certain of being destroyed, it was a matter of true policy and of justice to deceive so great a villain."

=== Battle of Plassey ===
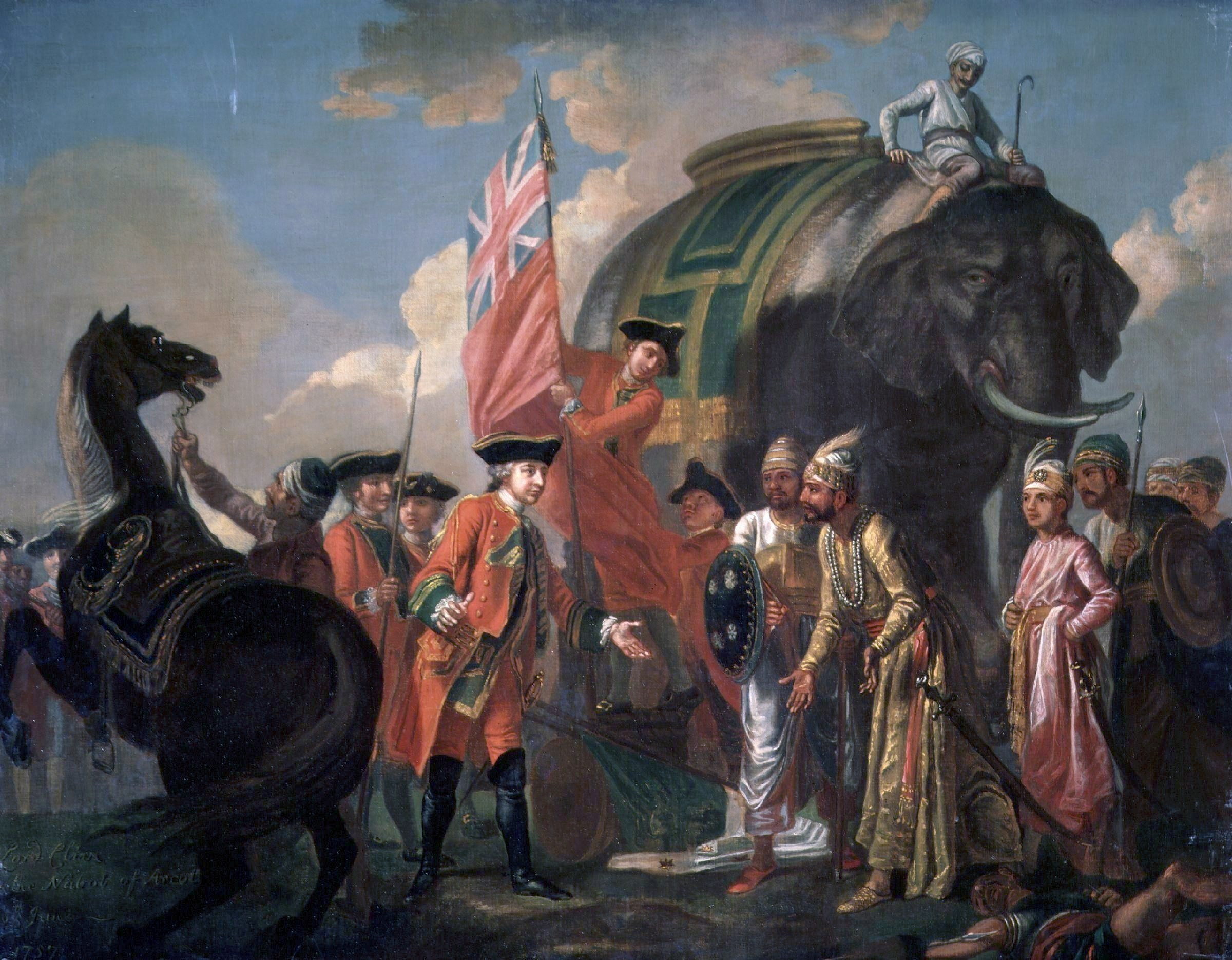
Robert Clive meeting with Mir Jafar after the Battle of Plassey, dramatized painting by Francis Hayman, 18th century

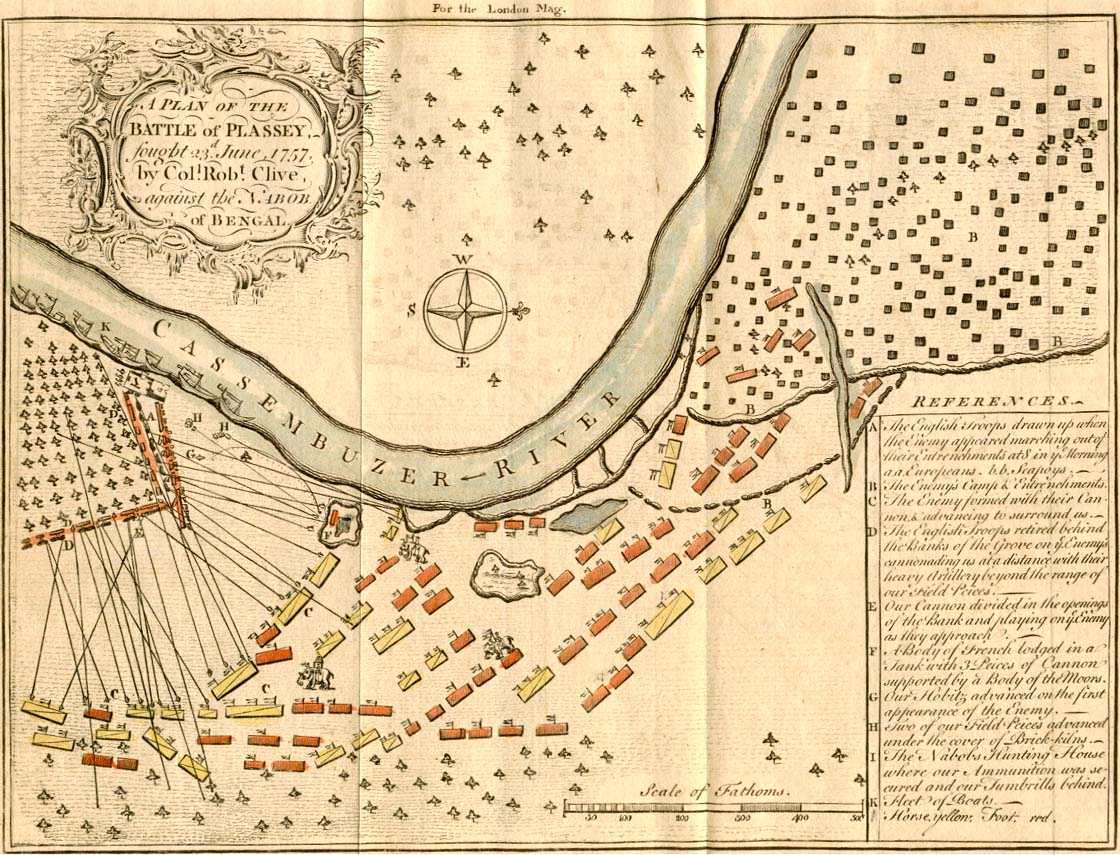
A plan of the Battle of Plassey, fought on 23 June 1757 by Robert Clive against the Nawab Siraj ud-Daulah of Bengal

The Battle of Plassey (or Palashi) is widely considered the turning point in the history of the subcontinent, marking the start of British rule in India. After Siraj-ud-Daulah's conquest of Calcutta, Clive took fresh troops from Madras to recapture the fort and avenge the attack. A retreating Siraj-ud-Daulah met the British at Plassey. He had to make camp 27 miles away from Murshidabad. On 23 June 1757 Siraj-ud-Daulah called on Mir Jafar because he was saddened by the sudden fall of Mir Mardan who was a very dear companion of Siraj in battles. The Nawab asked for help from Mir Jafar. Mir Jafar advised Siraj to retreat for that day. The Nawab made the blunder in giving the order to stop the fight. Following his command, the soldiers of the Nawab were returning to their camps. At that time, Robert Clive attacked the soldiers with his army. At such a sudden attack, the army of Siraj became undisciplined and could think of no way to fight. Much of the army retreated. Betrayed by the conspiracy plotted by Mir Jafar, Siraj lost the battle and had to escape. He rode away and went first to Murshidabad, specifically to Heerajheel or Motijheel, his palace at Mansurganj. He ordered his principal commanders to engage their troops for his safety, but as he was bereft of power due to the loss at Plassey, they were reluctant to offer unquestioning support. Some advised him to deliver himself up to the English, but Siraj equated this with treachery. Others proposed he should encourage the army with greater rewards, and this he seemed to approve of. Yet the numbers in his retinue were considerably diminished. Soon he dispatched most of the women of his harem to Purneah, under the protection of Mohanlal, with gold and elephants. Then, with his principal consort Lutf-un-Nisa and very few attendants, Siraj began his escape towards Patna by boat, but was eventually captured and confiscated by Mir Jafar. Mir Jafar held Siraj around the waist and dragged him to the palace. Mir jafar locked up Siraj afterwards.

== Death ==
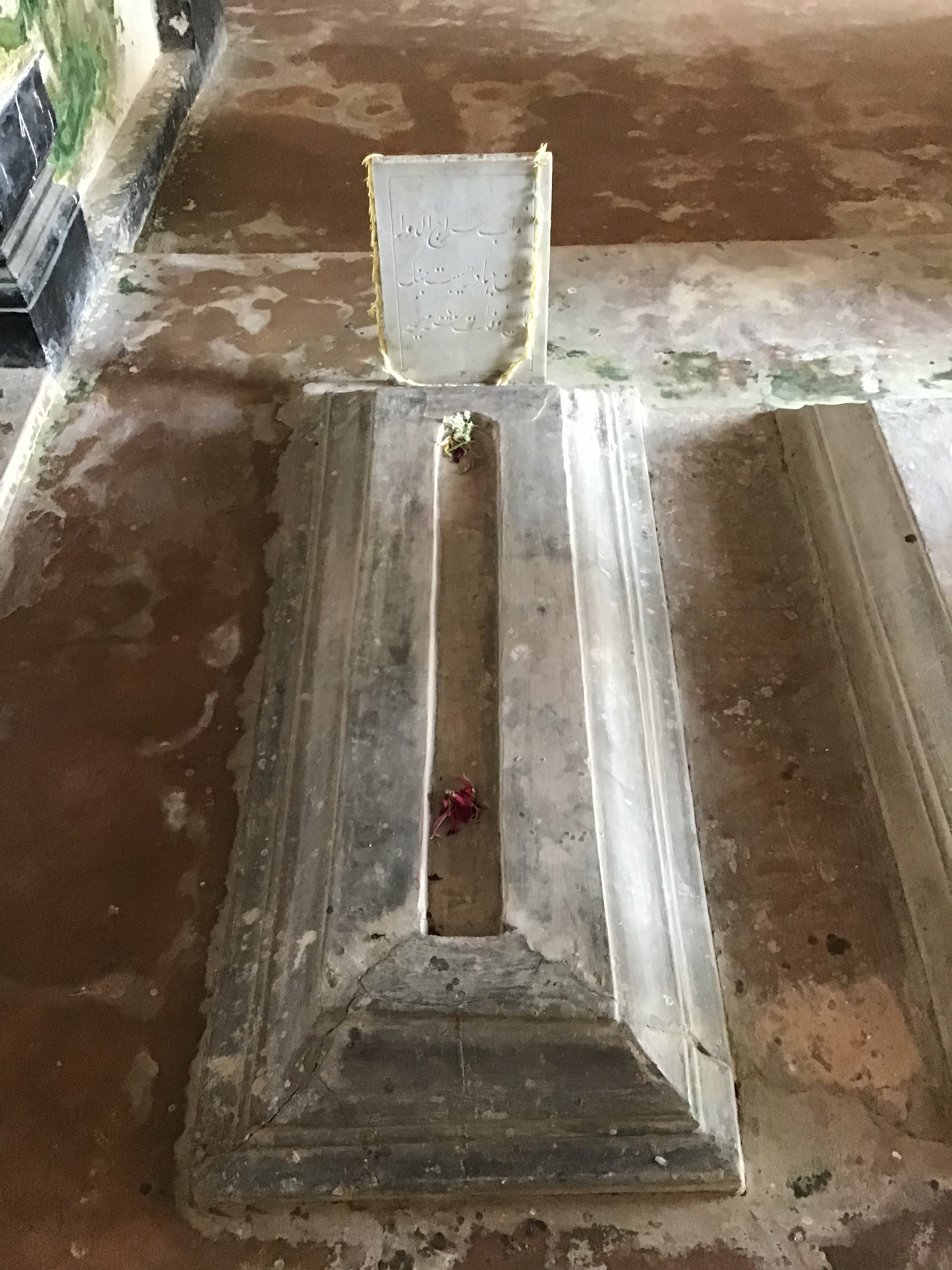
Tomb of Siraj ud-Daulah

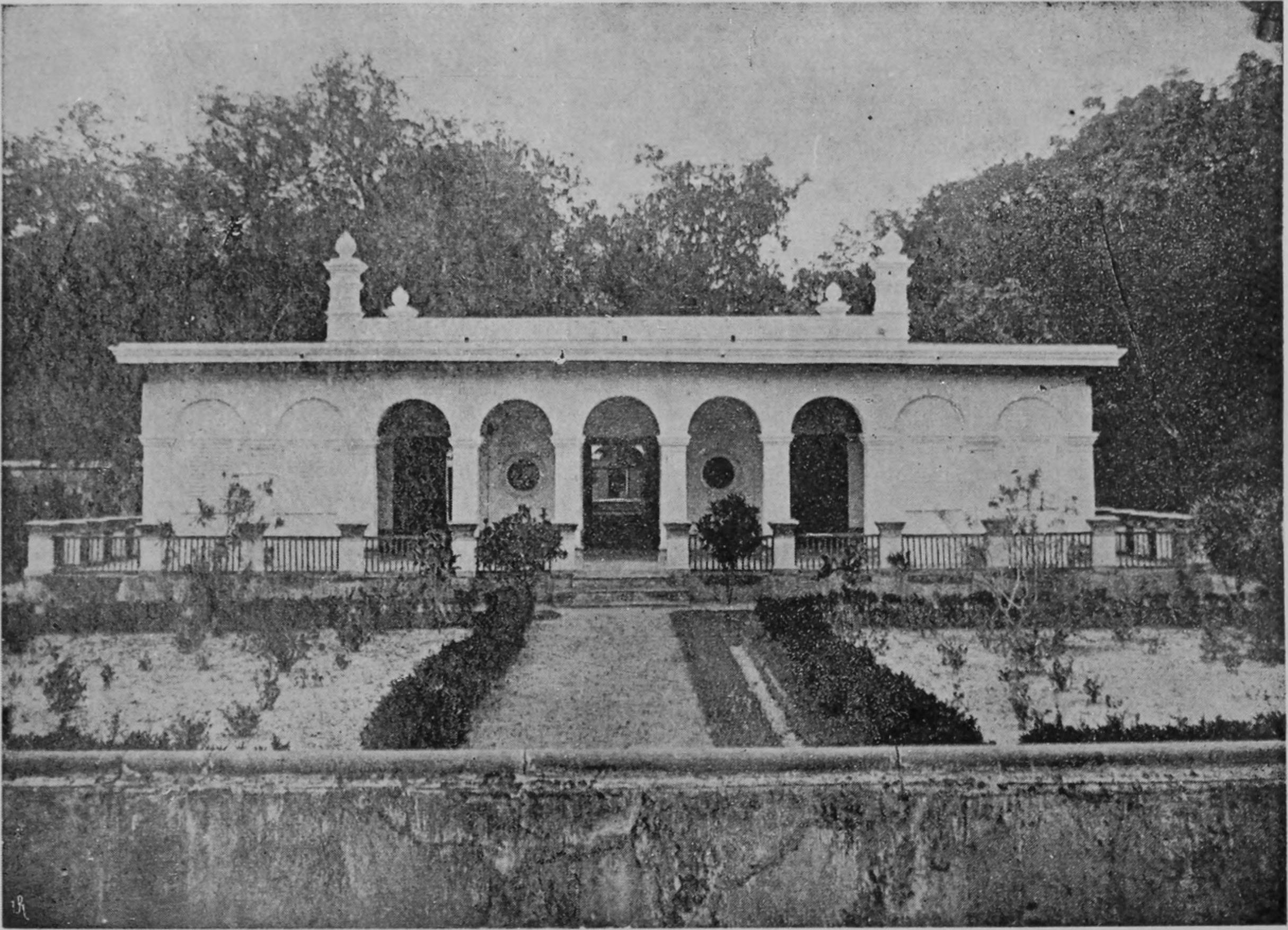
Masouleum of Siraj-ud-Daulah at Khushbagh, Murshidabad

Siraj-ud-Daulah was executed on 2 July 1757 by Mohammad Ali Beg under orders from Mir Miran, son of Mir Jafar in Namak Haram Deorhi as part of the agreement between Mir Jafar and the British East India Company.

Siraj-ud-Daulah's tomb is located at Khushbagh, Murshidabad, surrounded by gardens.

== Legacy ==
Siraj ud-Daulah has gained a positive reputation in India, Bangladesh, and Pakistan for his opposition to the beginning of British rule over India. In 1985, Sarkar wrote:

After the death of Alivardii Khan, his immature grandson became the nawab of Bengal, taking the name Mirza Mohammad Siraj-Ud-Daola. In addition to his young age, he had many kinds of defects in his character and conduct.

Historian Sushil Chaudhary argued that Siraj ud-Daula's villainous character is a misrepresentation.

The end of Siraj ud-Daulah's reign also ended Bengali autonomy and marked the beginning of British power in India. In the Bengali version of the end of his rule, Mir Jafar and Robert Clive are the villains and Siraj is the victim. Even though he is rarely if ever depicted as an attractive person, he is regarded as having been sinned against, rather than as a sinner. As the movement for Indian independence gathered strength, Siraj along with Tipu Sultan and the heroes of the First War of Indian Independence including the last Mughal Emperor, Bahadur Shah II, gained iconic status as people who resisted the imperial aggression.

Chayamanab (2022) by Soumen Jana is a Bengali novel based on Siraj ud-Daulah's life.

=== Namesakes ===
- Siraj ud Daula College, Karachi, Pakistan
- Nawab Siraj-ud-Daulah Government College, Natore, Bangladesh
- Masjid-e-Siraj ud-Daulah, Bangladesh
- Siraj-ud-Daula Road, Karachi
- Nabab Siraj ud-Daulah Road, Chittagong, Bangladesh
- Nawab Siraj-Ud-Daulah Sarani, Kolkata, India
- Siraj ud-Daulah Park, Old Dhaka, Bangladesh
- Siraj-ud-Doula Hall, Sher-e-Bangla Agricultural University, Bangladesh
- Nawab Siraj Ud-Daulah College, Kushtia, Bangladesh
- Nawab Sirajuddaula Road, Kushtia, Bangladesh
- Nawab Siraj ud-Daulah Hospital, Bangladesh
- Nawab Siraj ud Daulah Road, Narayanganj, Bangladesh

== In popular culture ==
- Shiraz-Ud-Dowla (1927), Indian silent film directed by Dhanjibhai K. Desai.
- Sirajuddaula (1938), musical opera by Nimalendu Lahiri.
- Siraj-Ud-Dowla (1952), Indian Bengali-language film directed by Amar Dutta.
- Ami Sirajer Begam (1960), historical novel set in Bengal by Sri Parabat.
- Sirajuddaula (1965), play by Sikandar Abu Zafar.
- Nawab Sirajuddaula (1967), an Indian Bengali-language film directed by Ramchandra Thakur, starring Bharat Bhushan.
- Nawab Sirajuddaula (1967), a Bangladeshi film directed by Khan Ataur Rahman featuring Anwar Hossain.
- Ami Sirajer Begam (1973), an Indian Bengali-language film directed by Sushil Mukhopadhyay, starring Ajitesh Bandopadhyay. Based on the 1960 novel by Sri Parabat.
- Nawab Sirajuddaula (1989), remake of the 1967 film by Khan Ataur Rahman.
- Ami Sirajer Begum (2018), Indian Bengali-language historical television soap opera.
- Zindabahar (2022), Bangladeshi drama series directed by Bangladesh Television

== See also ==
- Nawabs of Bengal
- List of rulers of Bengal
- History of Bengal
- History of Bangladesh
- History of India
- Shia Islam in India
- Battle of Chandannagar
- Siraj ud Daula College

== Notes ==
- Ġulām Ḥusain chaklim (1902). The Riyazu-s-salatin, A History of Bengal. Translated by Salam, Maulavi Abdus. Calcutta: The Asiatic Society. p. 363-370.
- Seid-Gholam-Hossein-Khan (1926). The Sëir Mutaqherin or Review of Modern Times. Vol. II. Calcutta: R. Cambray & Co. link to searchable text at the Packard Humanities Institute

Siraj-ud-Daulah Born: 1733 Died: 2 July 1757
Preceded by Alivardi Khan	Nawab of Bengal; 9 April 1756 – 2 June 1757	Succeeded by Mir Jafar
