= Chandanpura Mosque =

Mosque in Chittagong, Bangladesh

Chandanpura Masjid
- চন্দনপুরা মসজিদ
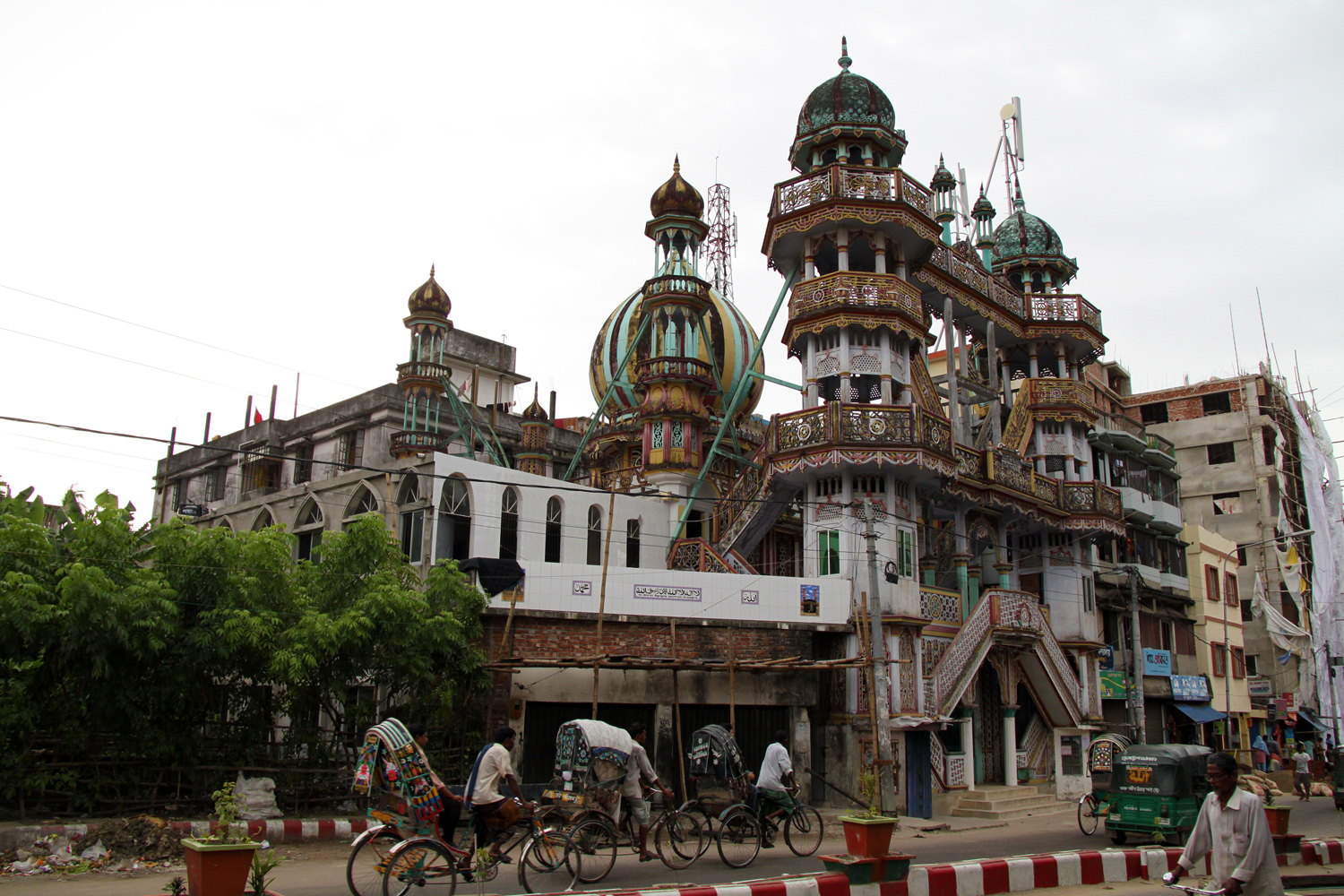

- Location of the mosque in Bangladesh

Religion
- Affiliation: Islam
- Ecclesiastical or organisational status: Mosque
- Status: Active

Location
- Location: Nabab Siraj ud-Daulah road, Chawkbazar Thana, Chittagong
- Country: Bangladesh
- Coordinates: 22°20′59″N 91°50′18″E

Architecture
- Type: Mosque architecture
- General contractor: Master Abdul Hamid
- Completed: 1870; 1952 (renovations)

Specifications
- Dome: Many
- Minaret: Two (maybe more)

The Chandanpura Mosque, also known as Masjid-e-Siraj ud-Daulah, is a mosque situated on Nabab Siraj ud-Daulah Road in Chittagong, Bangladesh. It is a landmark well known for its impressive architecture consisting of multiple domes and minarets painted in bright colors. Although it was renovated in 1952, the mosque has deteriorated over the years due to environmental factors, such as air pollution.

== Location ==
The mosque is in Chawkbazar Ward, Chittagong, on the west side of Nawab Siraj ud-Daulah Road. It is opposite the colonial-era two-storied red-brick Fire Brigade Station Chandanpura.

== History ==
The mosque was built in 1870 by architects and builders from Lucknow and Bombay working under contractor Master Abdul Hamid. Initially it was called Hamidia-Taj-Masjid. In 1947, renovations were begun by Abu Syed Dobhash, a descendant of Hamid. They were completed in 1952.

The International Dictionary of Historic Places says "Chandanpura Mosque, although of negligible historical interest, is a particularly beautiful structure".

== Gallery ==
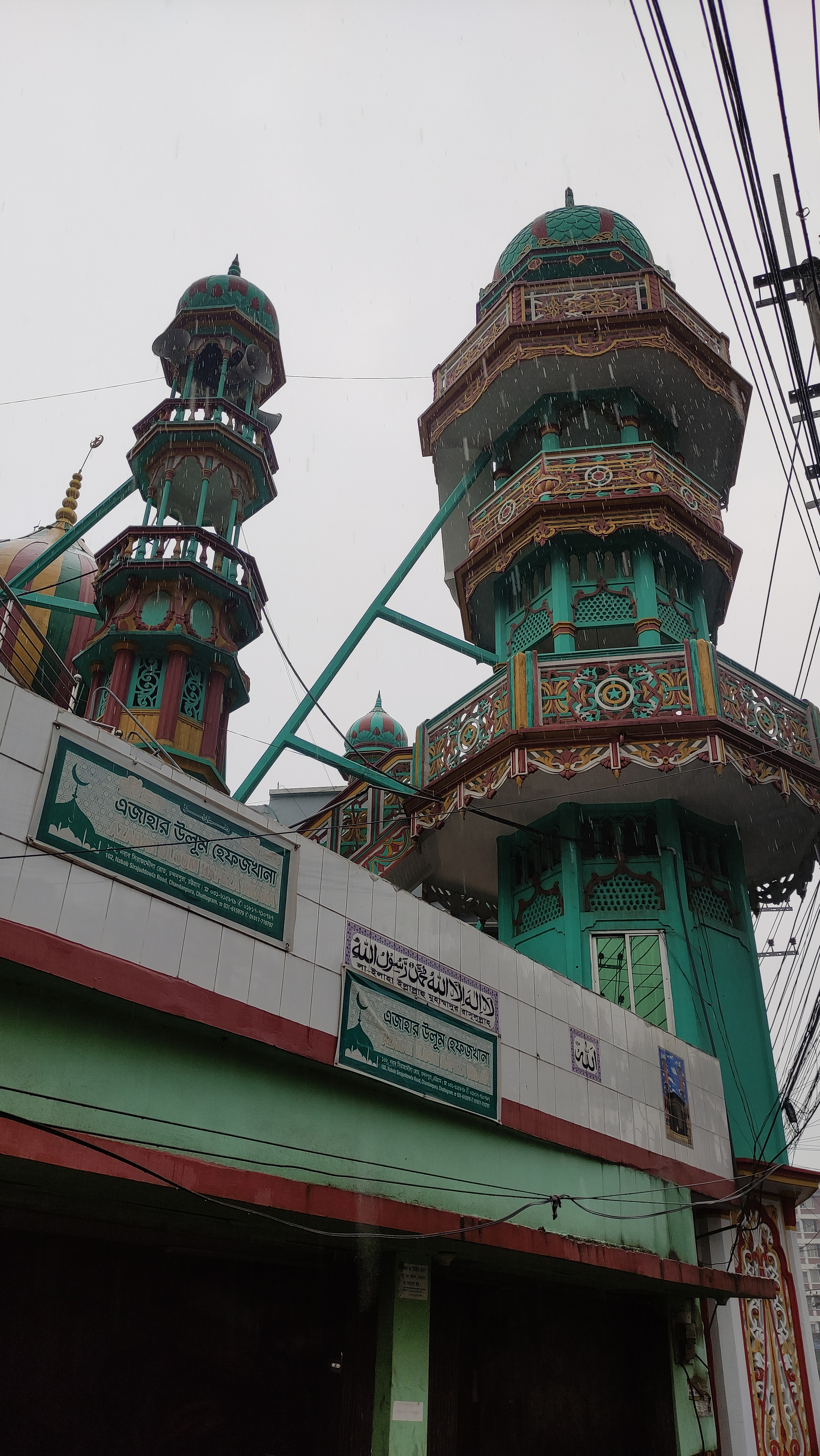
Minar

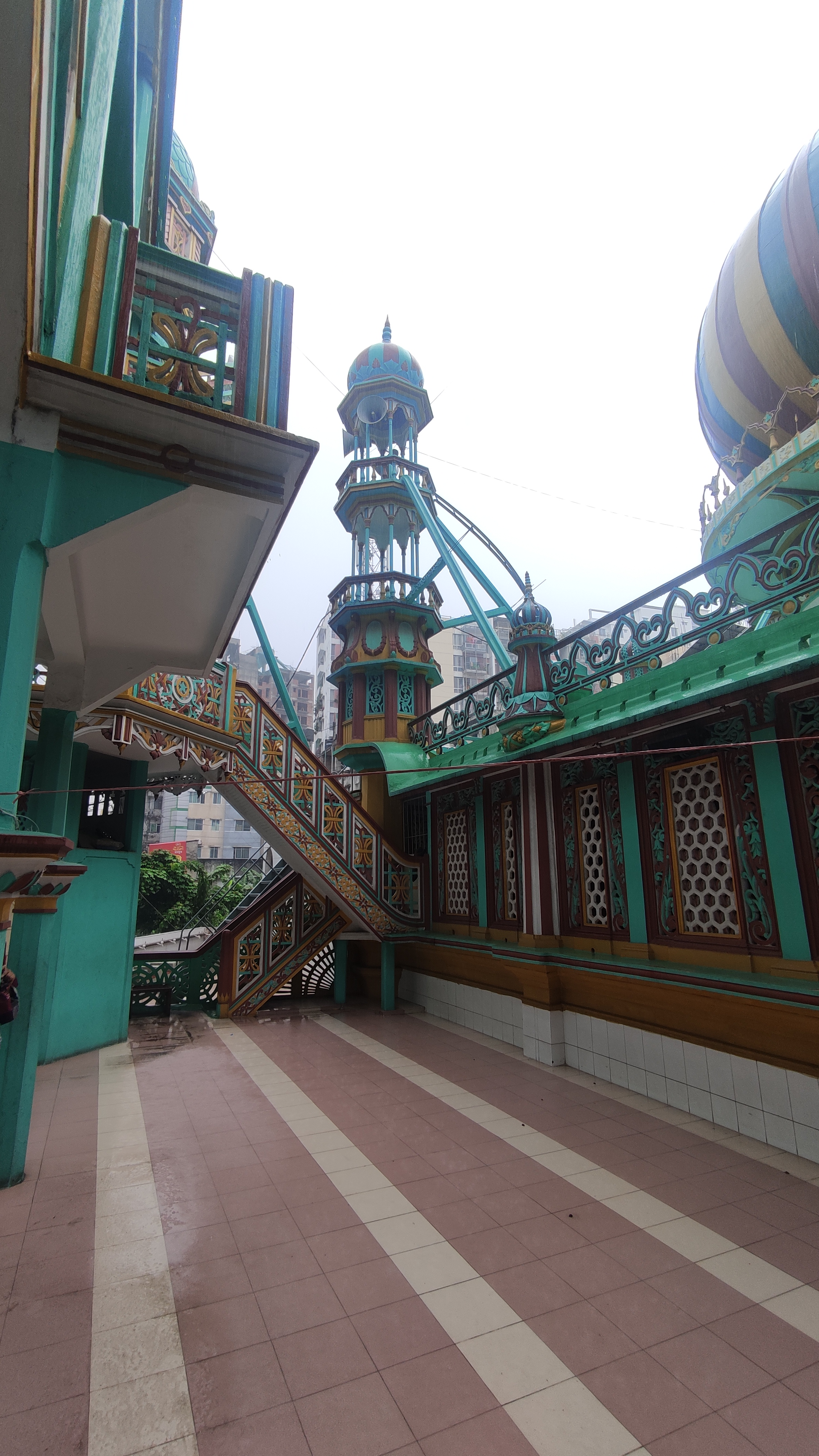
Upper roof

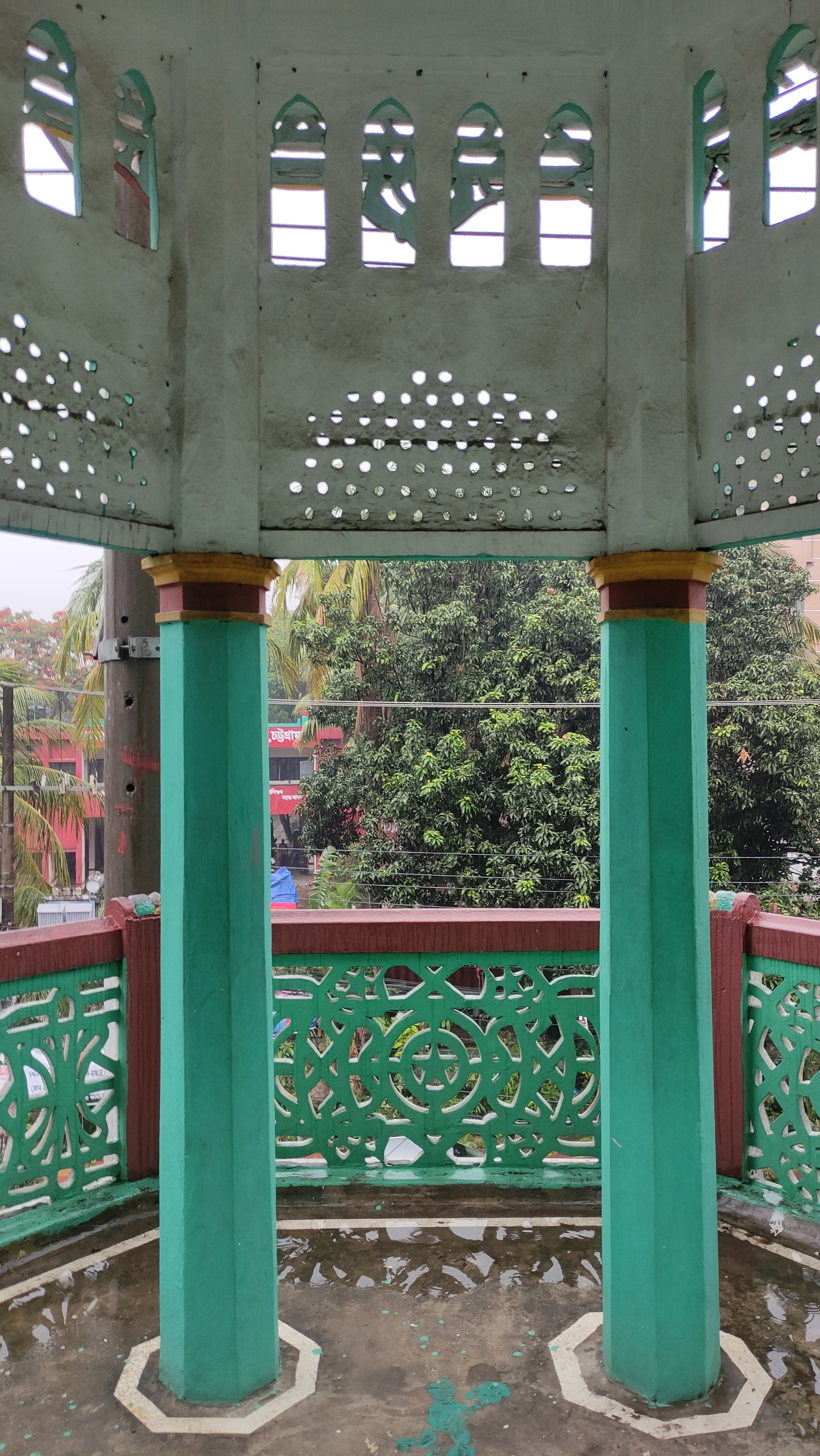
Details of minar

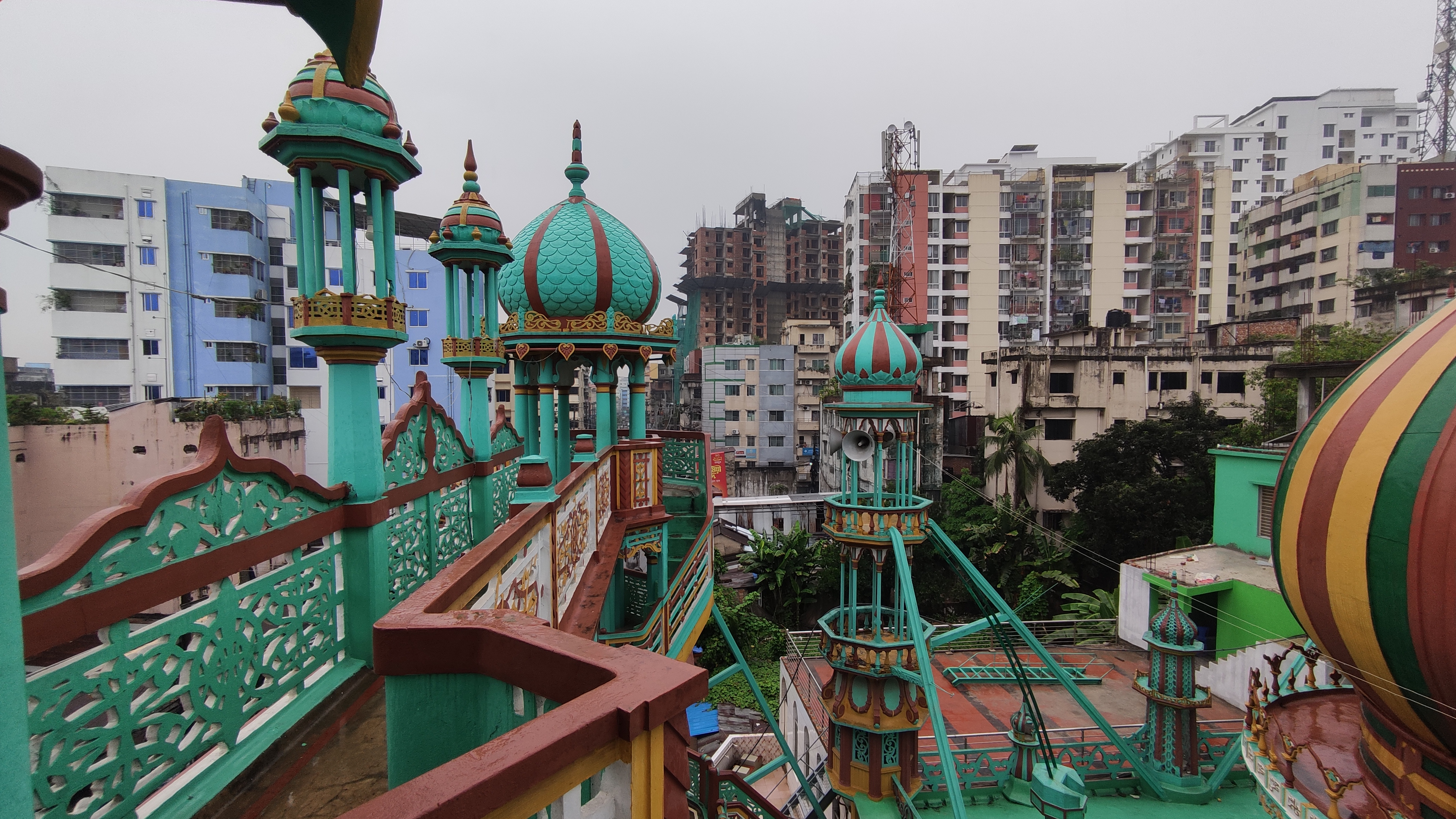
Aerial view

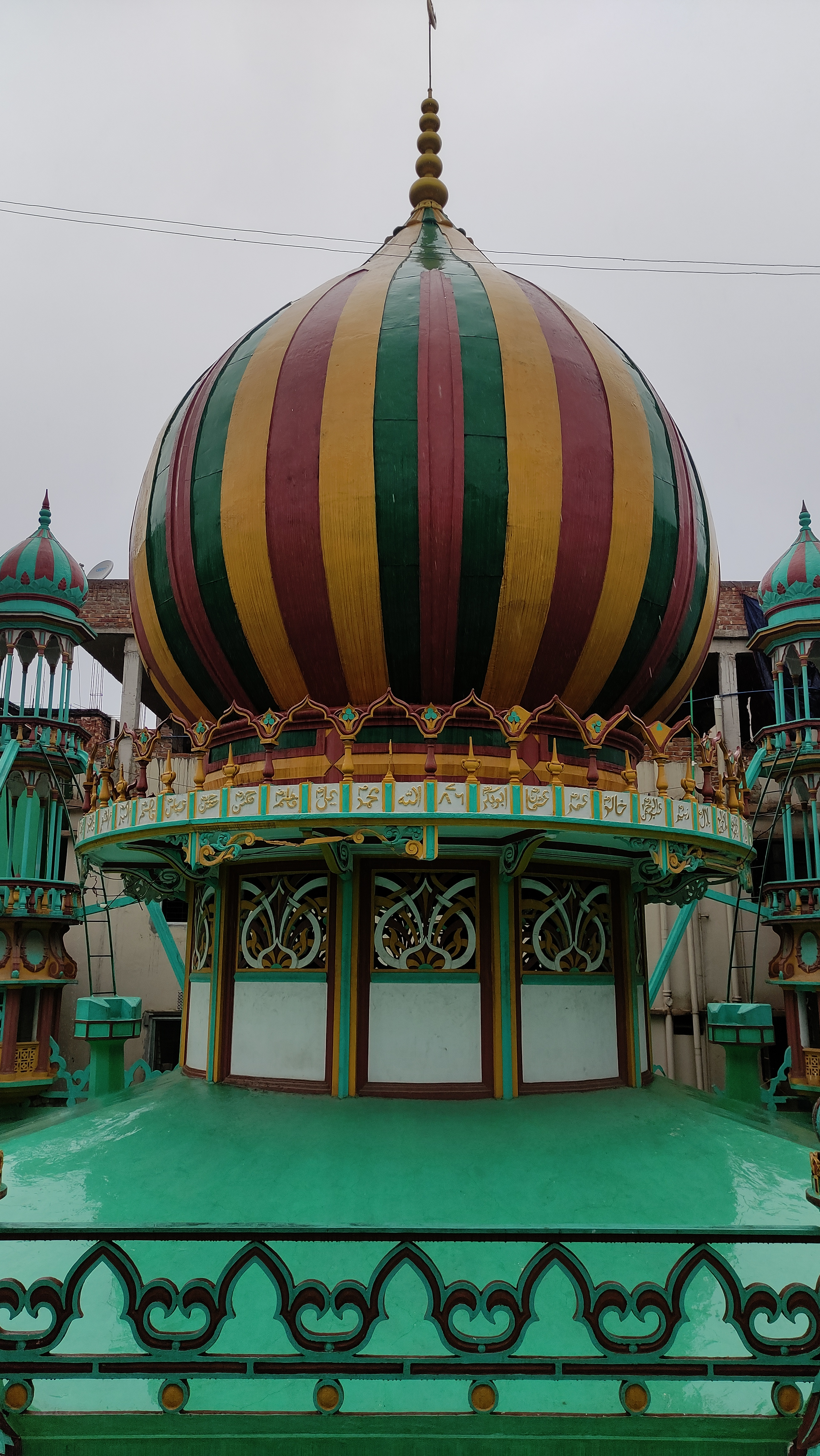
Dome

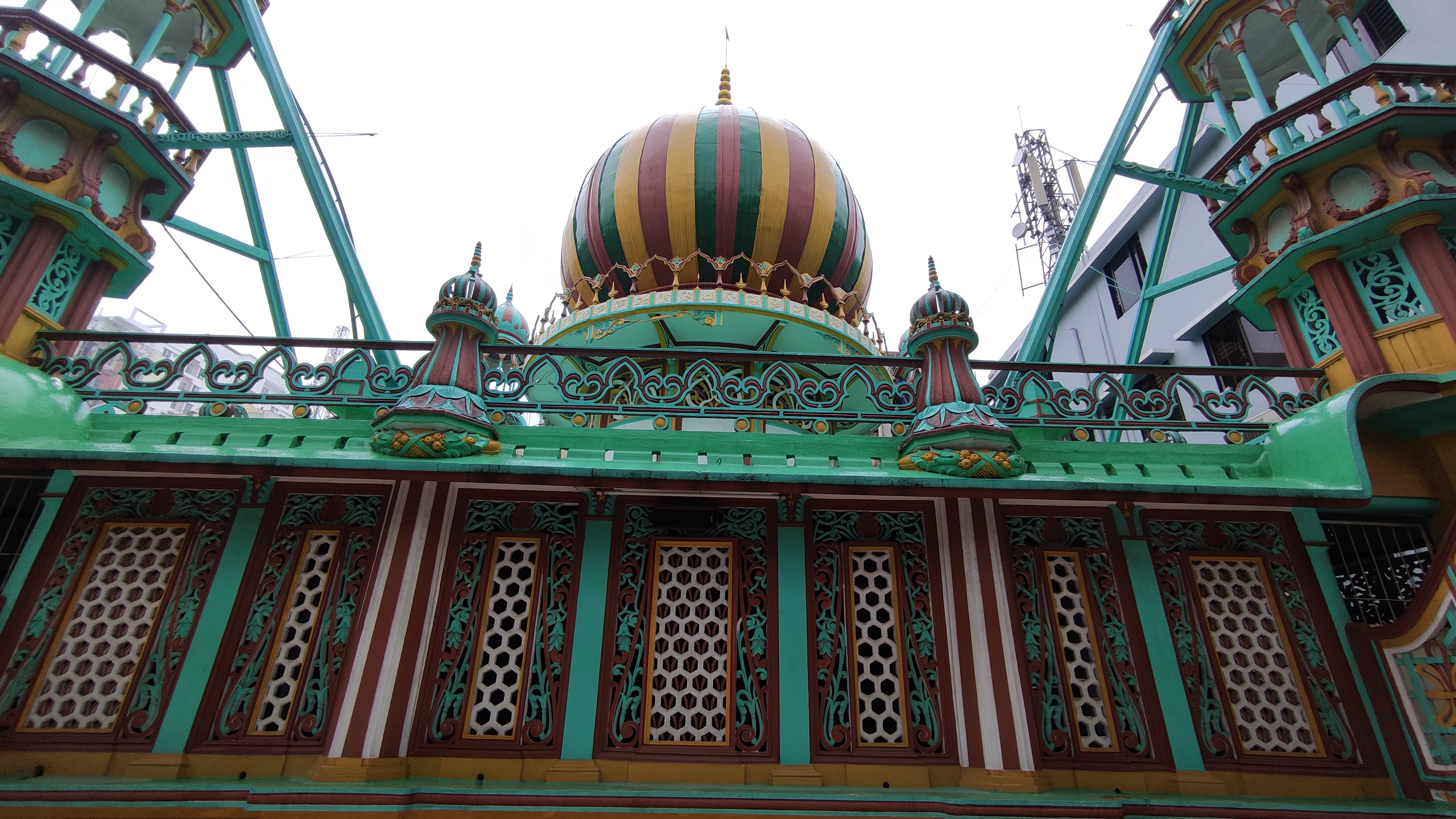
Roof

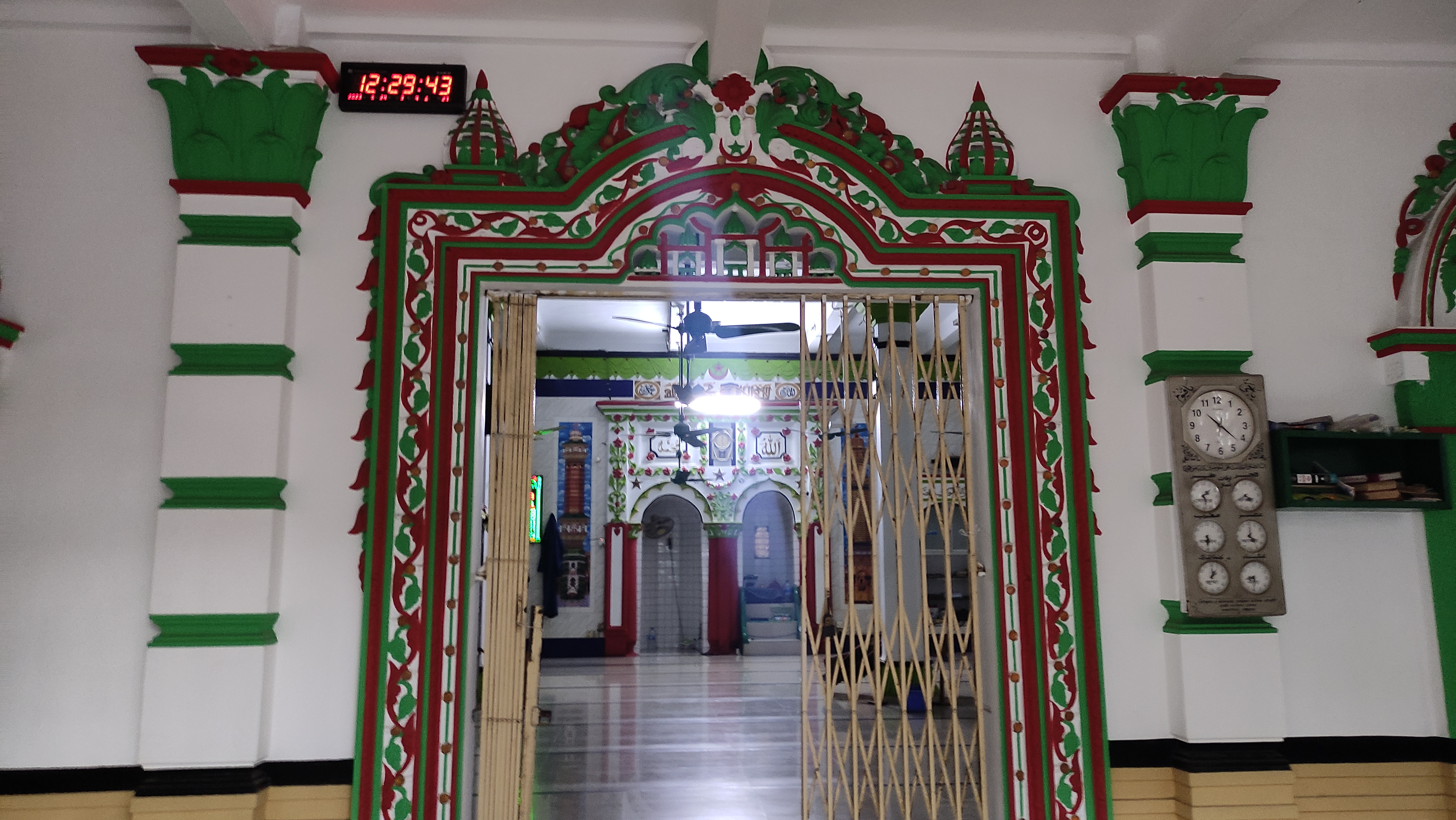
Entry

== See also ==
- Islam in Bangladesh
- List of mosques in Bangladesh
