= Khushbagh =

Cemetery in Murshidabad, West Bengal, India

Khoshbagh
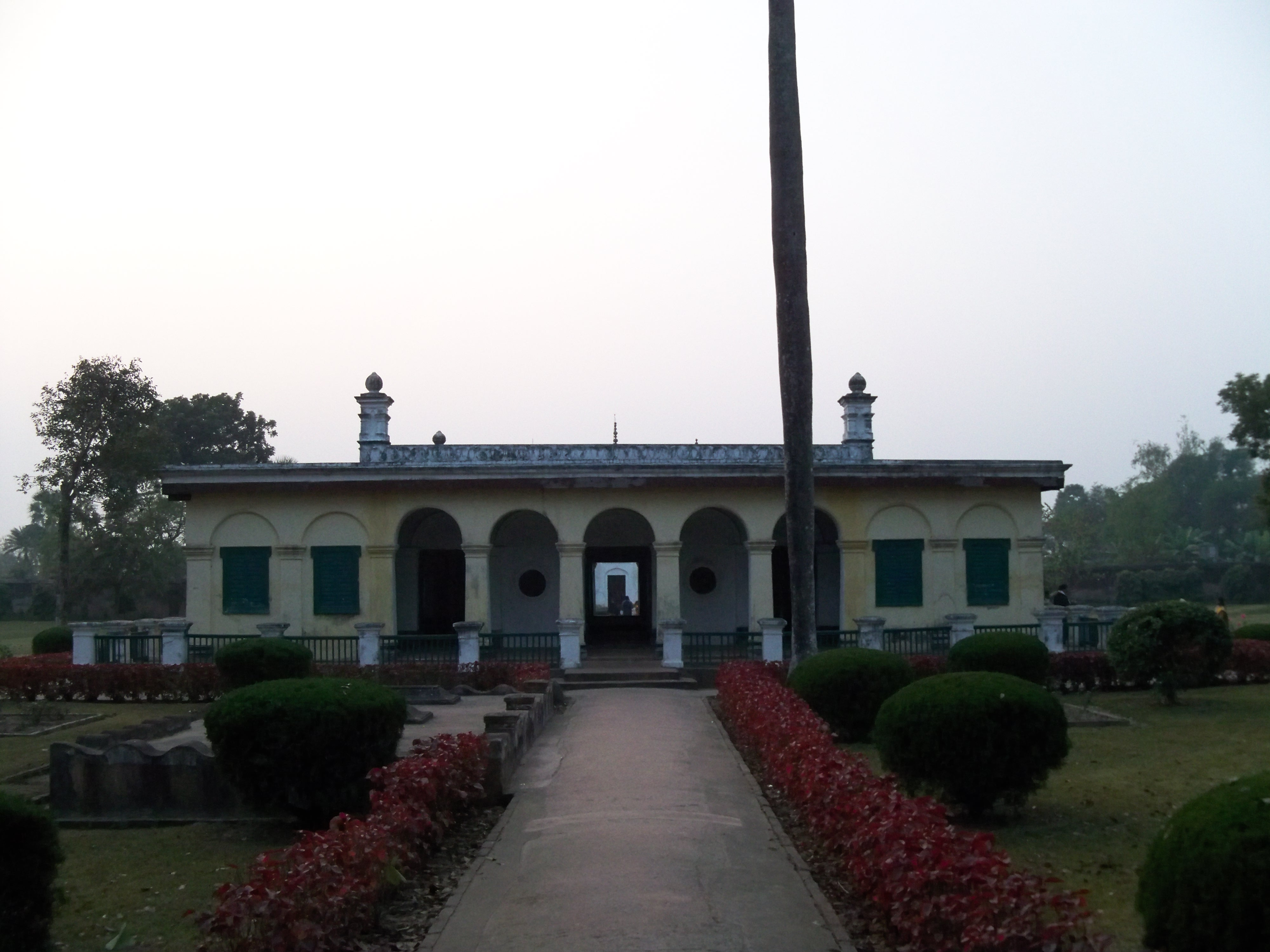
- Entrance of Khushbagh
- Interactive map of Khoshbagh

Details
- Location: Murshidabad, West Bengal, India
- Country: India
- Coordinates: 24.162610°N 88.258911°E
- Style: Islamic architecture
- Size: 7.65 acres (3.10 ha)
- No. of graves: Graves of Nawab Siraj ud-Daulah, Lutfunnisa Begum, Nawab Alivardi Khan, Alivardi Khan's mother and other members of the family of the Nawabs of Bengal
- Website: "Khoshbagh". Archived from the original on 8 January 2019.

Khushbagh (also spelled as Khoshbagh; literally "Garden of Happiness") is the garden-cemetery of the Nawabs of Bengal, situated on the west bank of the Hooghly river, about a mile from its east bank, in the Murshidabad-Jiaganj CD block in Lalbag subdivision of Murshidabad district, West Bengal, India. Khushbagh hosts the graves of the Nawabs of Bengal of the Afshar dynasty and their family members; while Jafarganj Cemetery hosts the graves of the later Nawabs and their families, starting from Mir Jafar, who belonged to the Najafi dynasty. Khushbagh is the resting place of Nawab Siraj ud-Daulah, his wife Lutf-un-nisa, Nawab Alivardi Khan, and his mother, amongst others.

== Geography ==
Cities, towns and locations in the Lalbag and Domkal subdivisions, Murshidabad district
M: municipal town, CT: census town, R: rural/ urban centre, H: historical place
Owing to space constraints in the small map, the actual locations in a larger map may vary slightly

=== Location ===
Khushbagh is located at 24.162610°N 88.258911°E.

Note: The map alongside presents some of the notable locations in the subdivisions. All places marked in the map are linked in the larger full screen map.

== History ==
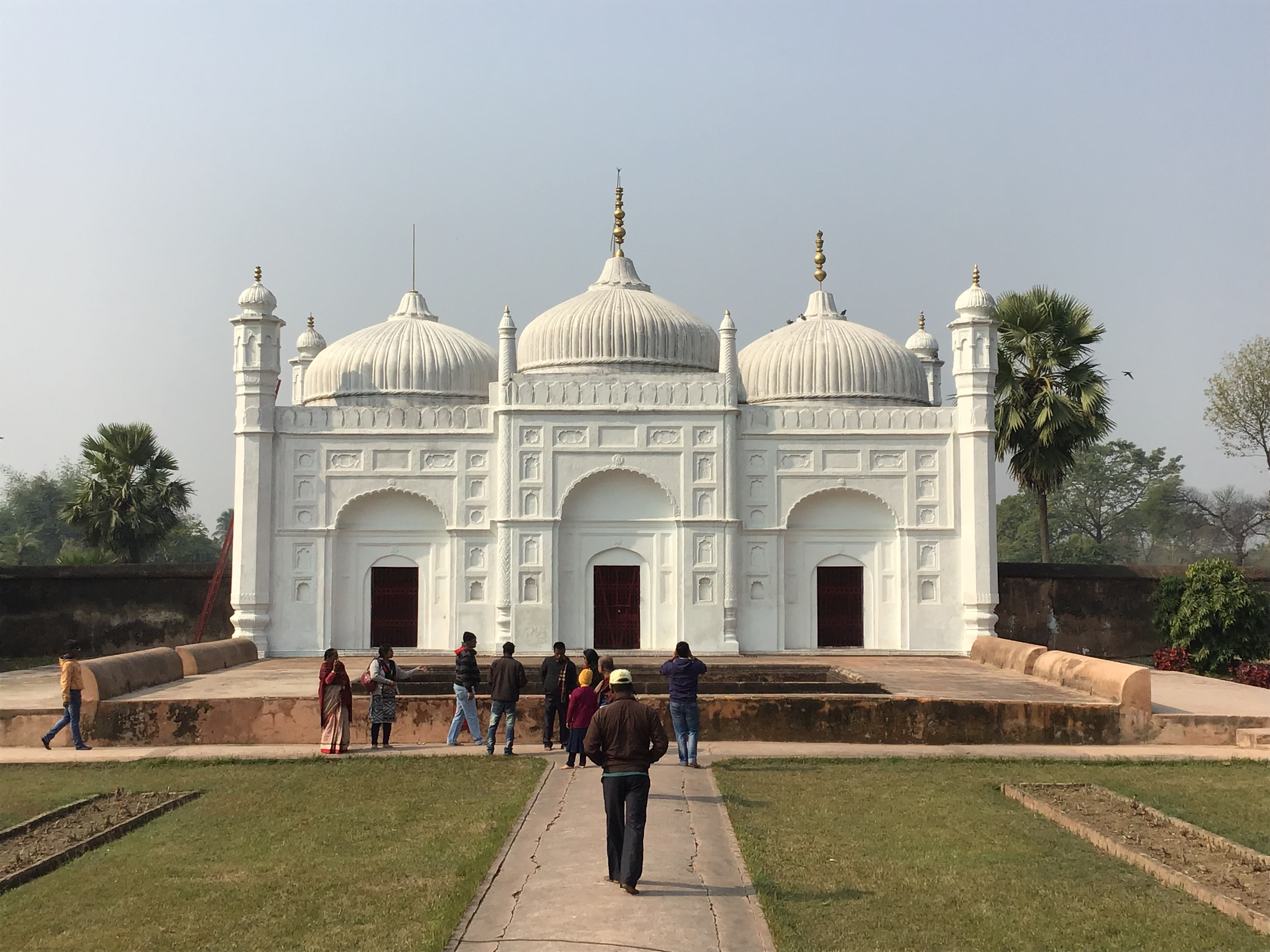
The mosque at Khushbag

The garden-cemetery was built by the first Nawab of Bengal, Nawab Alivardi Khan. It consists of walled enclosures. The outer walls had looped holes for musketry and used to be flanked by octagonal bastions. The garden hosts the graves of Siraj ud-Daulah and Alivardi Khan, inside a square, flat-roofed mausoleum surrounded by an arcade verandah. It also hosts a mosque, built by Nawab Alivardi Khan, on the lines of the Jama Masjid of Delhi, built on a plinth of 2,675 square feet (248.5 m^{2}) area.

After the death of Nawab Siraj ud-Daulah, in the Battle of Plassey in 1757, his wife Lutfunnisa Begum refused to join Mir Jafar's harem and fled to Dacca (present day Dhaka, in Bangladesh). She later returned to Murshidabad, and it is said that she lived in Khushbagh tending to his grave and the 108 varieties of roses which once bloomed in the gardens, for several years. She also allegedly spent ₹1,000 for the maintenance of Khushbagh and after her death, in 1790, she was buried near the grave of her husband Nawab Siraj ud-Daulah.

The garden-cemetery is built on a 7.65 acres (3.10 ha) land and is surrounded by a 2,741 feet (835 m) long wall.

== Gallery ==
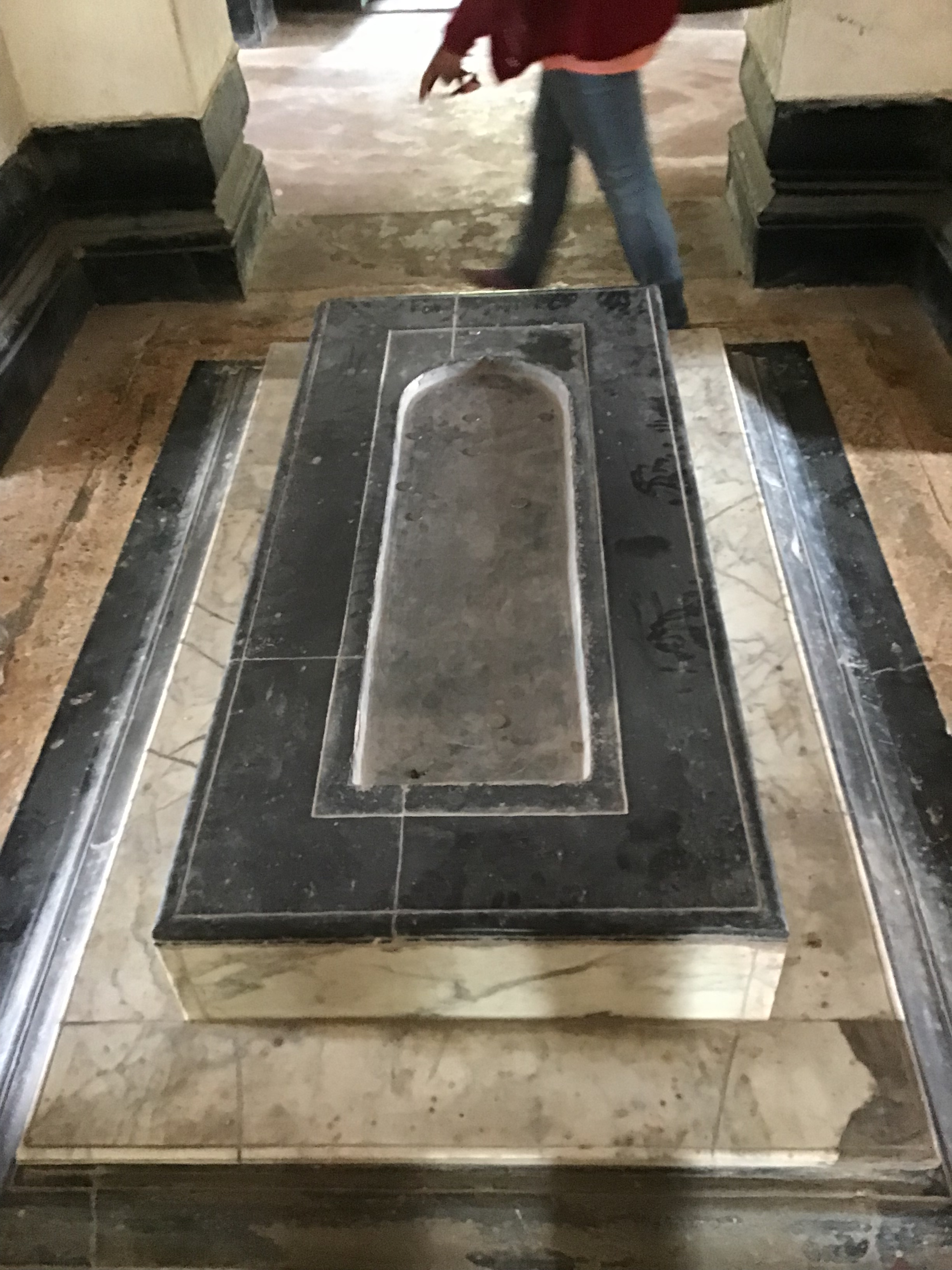
Tomb of Nawab Alivardi Khan

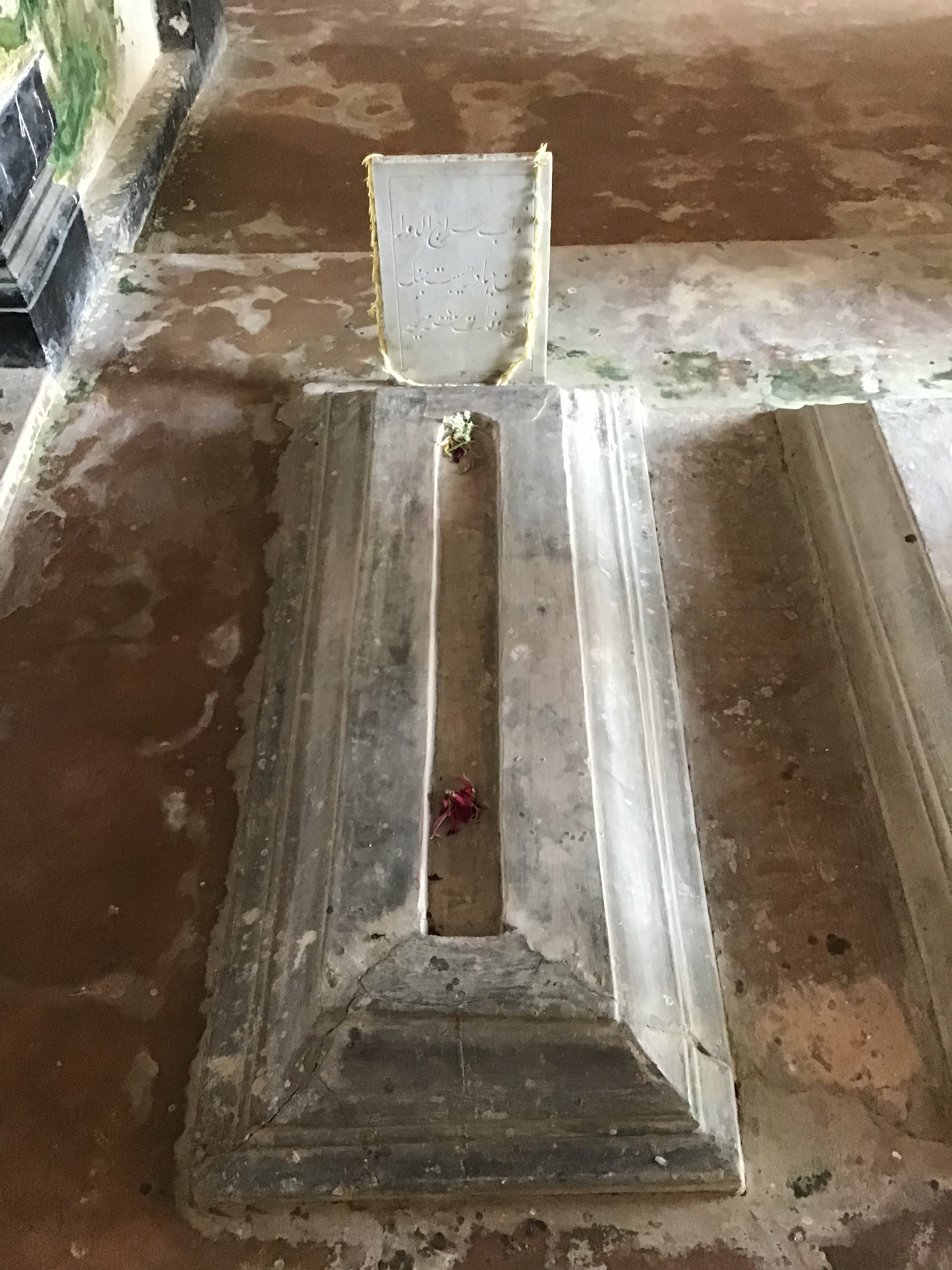
Tomb of Nawab Siraj ud-Daulah

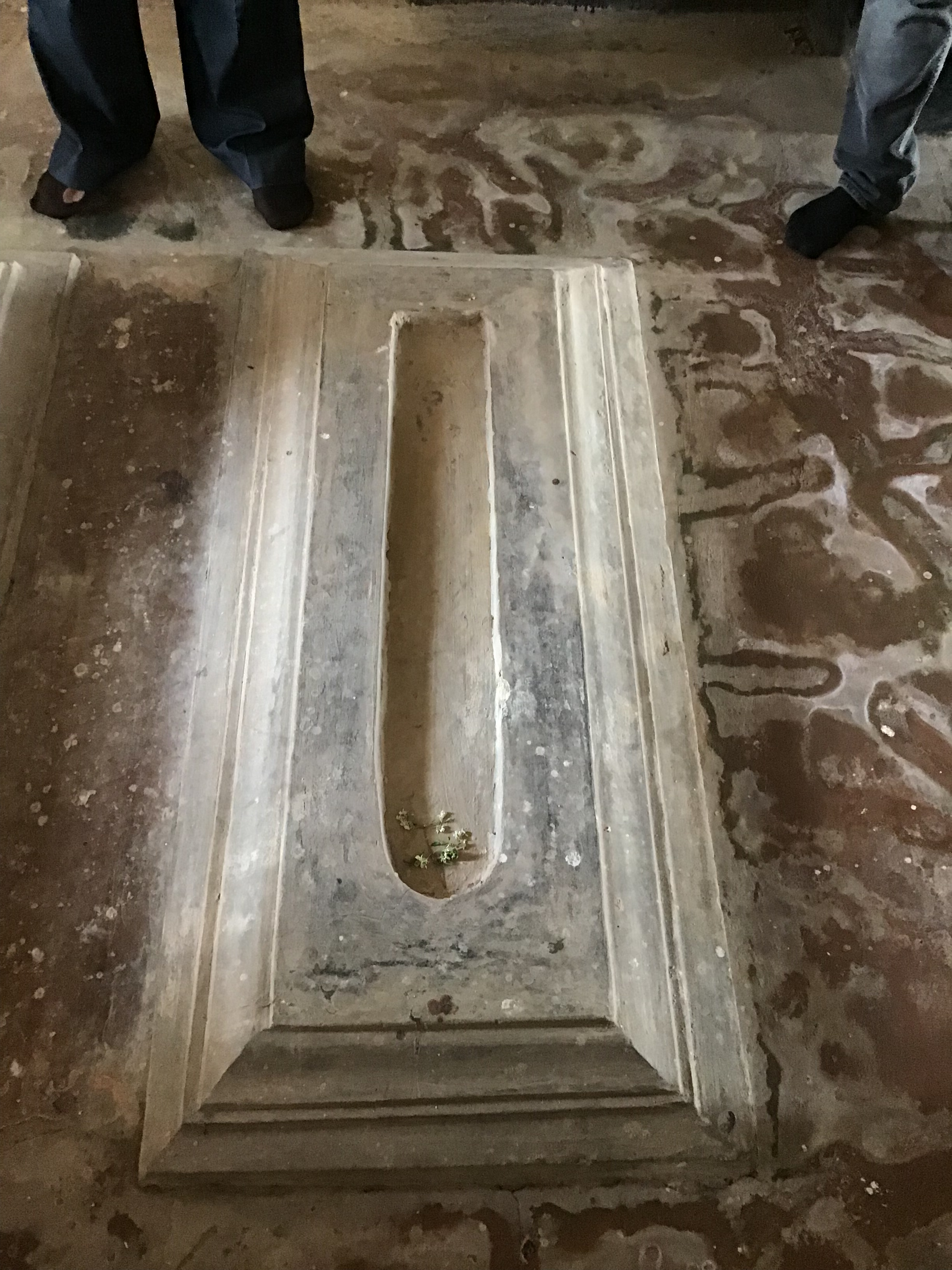
Tomb of Lutfunnisa Begum

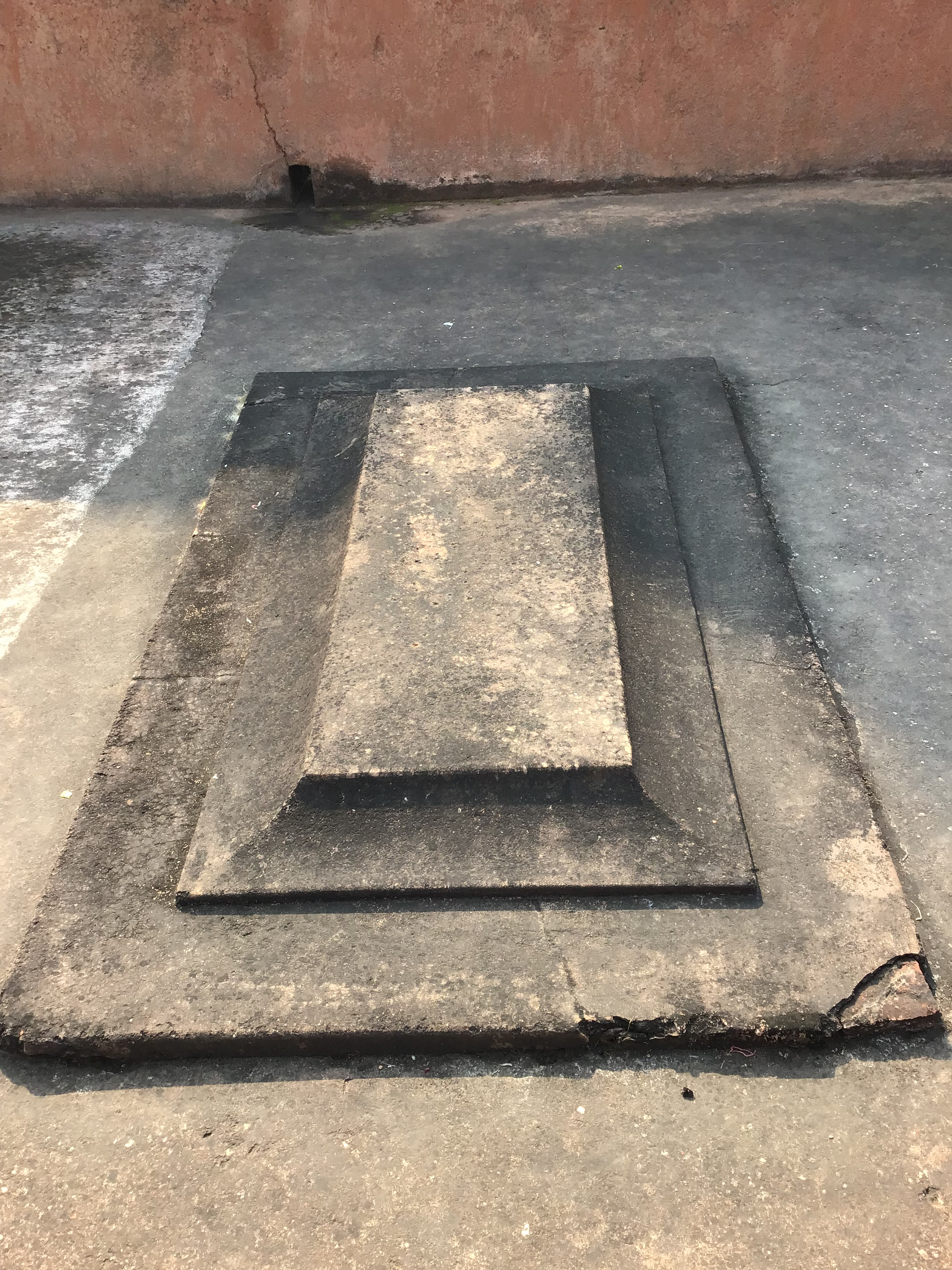
Tomb of Amina Begum, mother of Siraj ud-Daulah

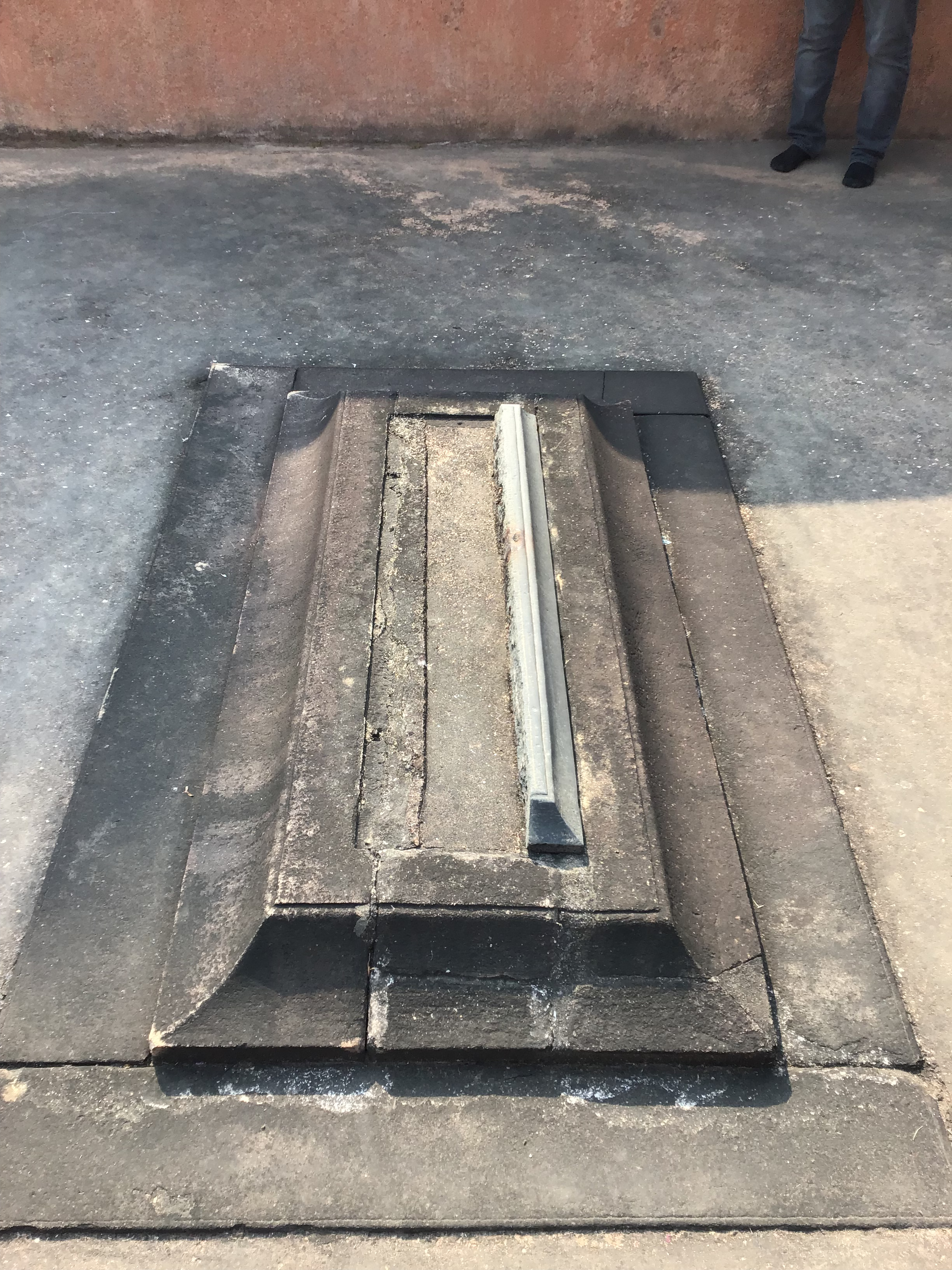
Tomb of Ghaseti Begum, the eldest daughter of Alivardi Khan
