= Sree Parabat =

Bengali writer and journalist (1927–2010)

Prabir Kumar Goswami
- শ্রীপারাবত (প্রবীর কুমার গোস্বামী)
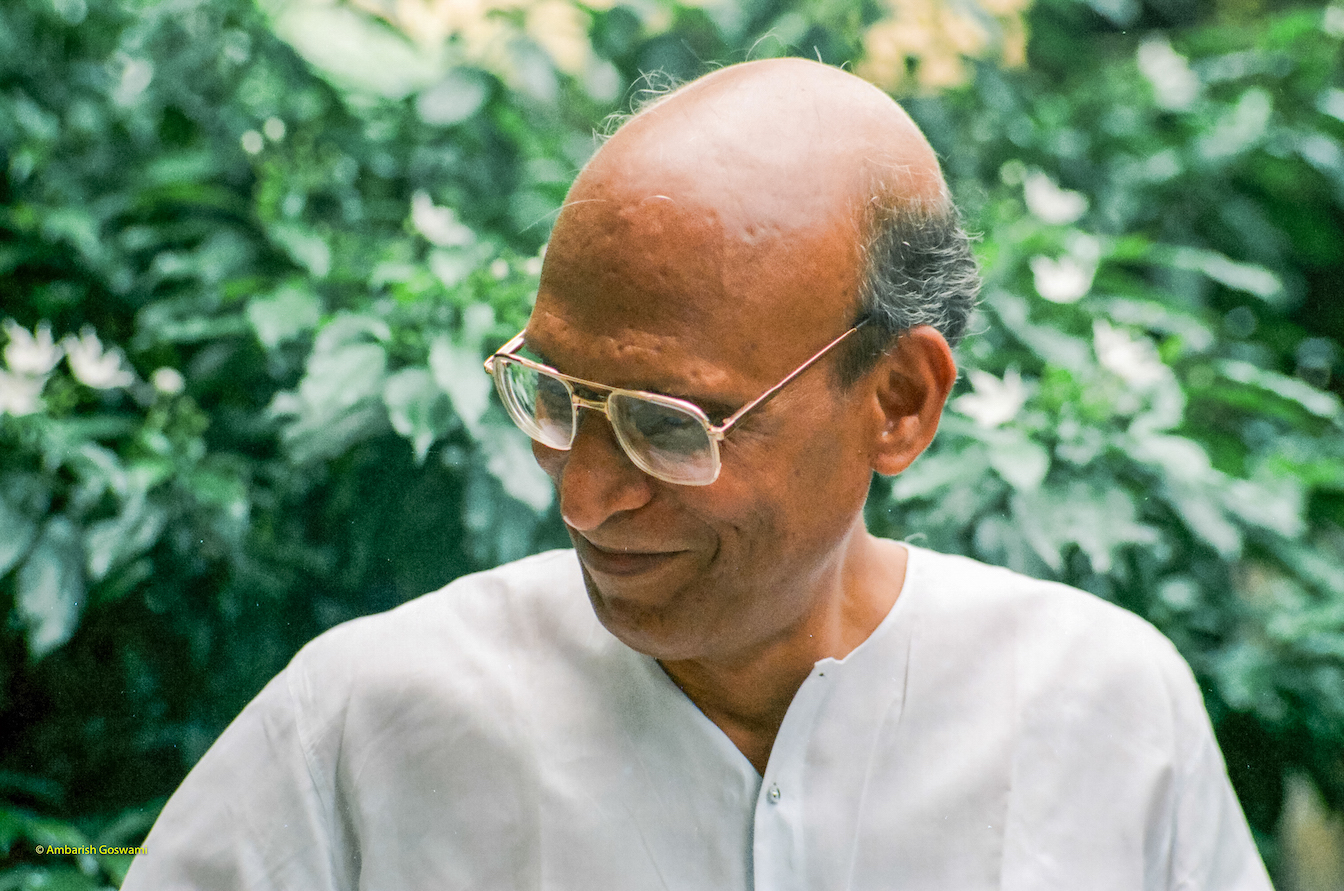
- Portrait of Sree Parabat taken at his residence in Kolkata in 1992
- Born: 1 January 1927; Amla Sadarpur, Kusthia, Undivided Bengal (now in Bangladesh)
- Died: 2 November 2010 (aged 83); Kolkata, India
- Education: Scottish Church College
- Occupations: Writer, Assistant Commissioner of Police, Kolkata Police
- Relatives: Rebanta Goswami (Brother), Amiya Bhushan Majumdar (cousin),Advaita Acharya, Bijoy Krishna Goswami, Dwijendralal Ray
- Writing career
- Pen name: Sree Parabat, Sri Parabat

Sree Parabat or Sri Parabat (1 January 1927 – 2 November 2010) was a Bengali-language writer from Kolkata, India, known mainly for his historical novels.

His novels include Ami Sirajer Begum, Mamtaz Duhita Jahanara, and Aravalli Thekey Agra.

Sree Parabat is a pen name; The writer's actual name was Prabir Kumar Goswami.

== Early life and family background ==
He was born to Sudhir Kumar Goswami and Preetibindu Devi at his maternal grandparents' home in Cooch Behar on 1 January 1927.

The Goswami family's ancestral home was in Amla Sadarpur, Nadia district in undivided Bengal, (presently Kusthia district in Bangladesh).

Both his parents belonged to very educated and literary Hindu families. On his father's side, he belonged to the Hindu Baishnava family "Advaita Parivāra", which was the 13th generation of direct descendant of Sree Sree Advaita Acharya, who was the childhood teacher and later a close associate and follower of Chaitanya. Hindu social reformer Bijoy Krishna Goswami also belongs to the same holy family and was the 7th-generation direct descendant of Sree Sree Advaita Acharya.

Novelist and science-fiction writer Rebanta Goswami was his own younger brother and novelist Amiya Bhushan Majumdar was a first cousin of Sree Parabat on the maternal side.

== Adaptation ==
The novel Ami Sirajer Begum was made into a multi-episode television show starting from 10 December 2018.

== Death ==
He died on 2 November 2010 at his Kolkata house.

During the last fifteen years of his life, he lived in the Santoshpur, Kolkata. Before that, he lived in Beliaghata, Park Circus and, even before, North Kolkata.

== List of major works ==
1. 1960 Ami Sirajer Begum
2. 1965 Aravalli Theke Agra
3. 1967 Mohaprem
4. 1971 Bahadur Shah
5. 1972 Mamtaz Duhita Jahanara (ISBN 81-7079-276-2)
6. 1976 Ranadil
7. 1977 Chitor Garh
8. 1977 Tokhon Warren Hastings
9. 1981 Ranasthal Marwar
10. 1984 Mewar Bonhi Padmini
11. 1990 Murshidkuli Khan
12. 1990 Magadh Jugey Jugey: Rajagriha Parba
13. 1991 Ajodhyar Shesh Nabab
14. 1992 Tutankhamener Raani
15. 1995 Magadh Jugey Jugey: Pataliputra Parba
16. 1995 Mishor Samrajni Hatshepshut (ISBN 81-7079-729-2)
17. 1998 Nadir Shah (ISBN 81-7612-176-2)
18. 1998 Mahammad Bin Tughlaq (ISBN 81-86036-34-2)
19. 1999 Karnasubarna Thekey Kanyakubja (ISBN 81-7612-393-5)
20. 2000 Patabhumi Pataliputra (ISBN 81-86036-57-1)
21. 2001 Sher Shah (ISBN 81-7612-744-2)
22. 2002 Alauddin Khilji (ISBN 81-86036-71-7)
23. 2002 Chandraketugarh (ISBN 81-7612-966-6)
24. 2004 Begumer Nam Debal Ranee (ISBN 81-295-0189-9)
25. 2007 Bijoynagar (ISBN 81-295-0766-8)

=== Social novels ===
1. 1957 Jhor Thambey
2. 1960 Jey Jiban Deen
3. 1960 Swarnalee Sondhya
4. 1961 Ahir Bhoiron
5. 1962 Kitagarh
6. 1963 Em El Pampa (M. L. Pampa)
7. 1966 Nirjonota Nei
8. 1968 Jonomey Jonomey
9. 1969 Ami Aj Nayika
10. 1970 Lovers' Lane (ISBN 81-87493-16-X)
11. 1972 Durjoy Durgo
12. 1973 Singha Dwar
13. 1973 Shyamal Deshey Surjo Othey
14. 1974 Binodinee
15. 1977 Safe Landing
16. 1988 Akhono Shiuli Jhorey
17. 1989 Aakasher Nichey Manush
18. 1994 Rajrajeswari
19. 1996 Moynamoti (ISBN 81-86036-16-4)
20. 1997 Raja Badshah (ISBN 81-86036-27-X)
21. 2001 Khuner Araley (ISBN 81-86036-66-0)

=== Children's novels ===
1. 1967 Hariye Jabar Nei Mana
2. 1975 Era Tinjon
3. 1993 Raat Mohanar Rohoshyo (ISBN 81-86036-00-8)
4. 1994 Girikondorey Rohoshyo (ISBN 81-86036-08-3)

=== Collections of novels ===
1. 1994 Panchalika (Contains Aami Sirajer Begum, Binodinee, Swarnalee Sandhya, Jonomey Jonomey, Shotorupey Shotobar)
2. 2010 Panchti Oitihashik Kahinee (Collection of five historical novels: Tutankhamener Rani, Tokhon Oaren Hastings, Rajput Nandini, Aami Sirajer Begum and Mamtaz Duhita Jahanara)

=== In Odissi ===
1. Mumtaz Duhita Jahanara
2. Ranadil

== Screen adaptations ==
- Many of Sree Parabat's works have been made into films. The film Ami Sirajer Begam was released in 1973.
