= Ami Sirajer Begam =

1973 film directed by Sushil Mukhopadhyay

- Movie poster
- আমি সিরাজের বেগম
- Directed by: Sushil Mukhopadhyay
- Written by: Sree Parabat
- Produced by: Manik Roy Production
- Music by: Anil Bagchi
- Release date: 1973
- Country: India
- Language: Bengali

Ami Sirajer Begam is a 1973 Indian Bengali historical film directed by Sushil Mukhopadhyay based on a same name novel of Sree Parabat.

== Plot ==
Based on a historical plot, the film is about the life of Nabab Siraj-ud-daulah and his wife Lutfa.

== Cast ==
- Biswajit Chatterjee as Siraj-Ud-Daulah
- Sandhya Roy as Lutfunnisa Begum
- Shekhar Chatterjee
- Ajitesh Bandopadhyay
- Dilip Roy
- Pahari Sanyal
- Bikash Roy
- Amarnath Mukhopadhyay
- Biren Chatterjee
