= Amina Begum =

- Nawabzadi of Bengal
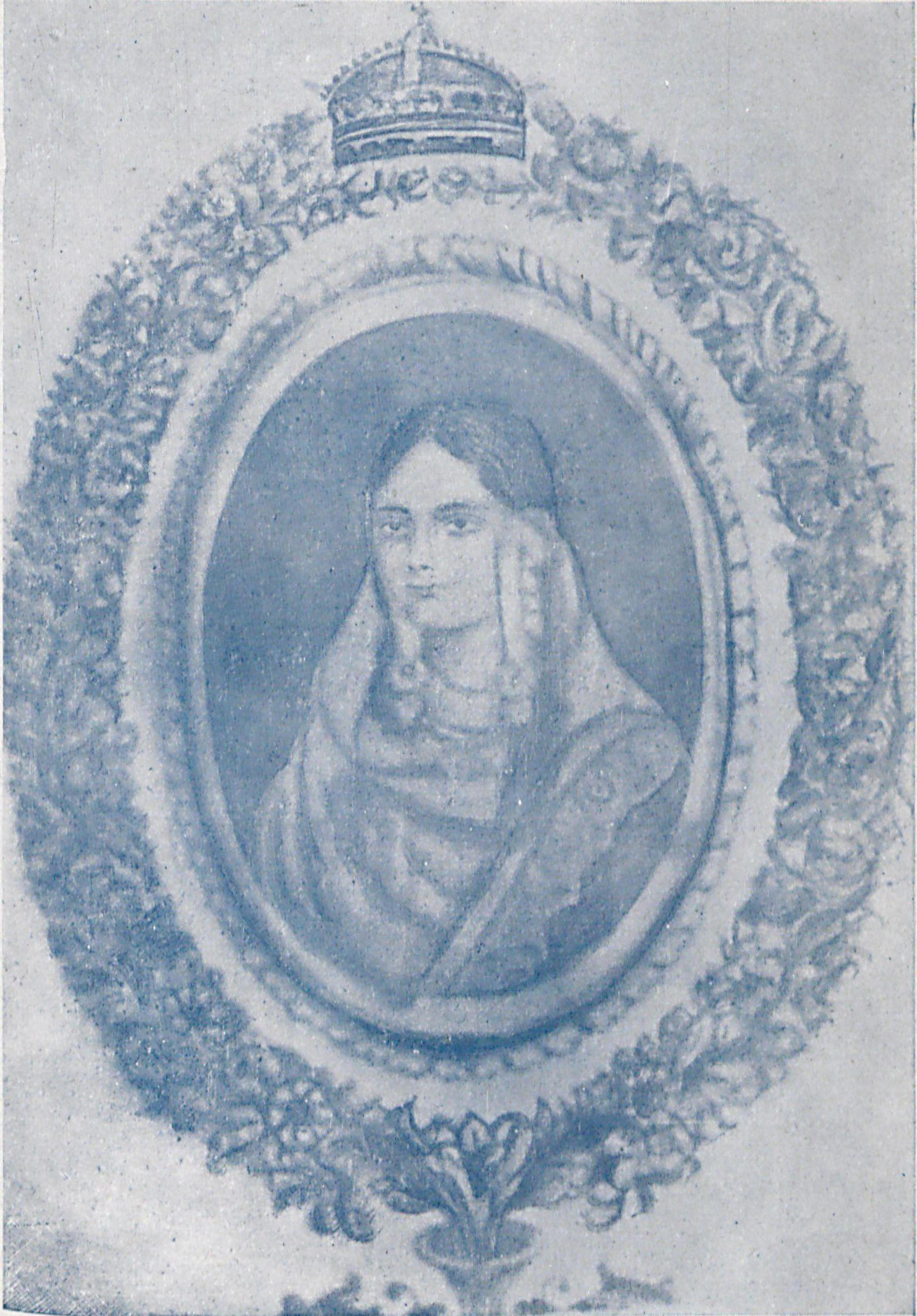
- Portrait of Amina Begum from Banglar Begum (1912)
- Died: November 1760; Jahangirnagar, Bengal Subah
- Burial: c. 1760; Khushbagh, Murshidabad, Bengal Subah
- Spouse: Zain ud-Din Ahmed Khan
- Issue: Ikram ud-Daulah; Siraj ud-Daulah
- House: Afshar (by birth)
- Father: Nawab Alivardi Khan
- Mother: Sharf-un-Nisa (sister of Sayyid Ahmed Najafi and daughter of Sayyid Hussain Najafi)
- Religion: Shia Islam

Amina Begum (Bengali: আমিনা বেগম, Persian: امینه بیگم) was a Bengali aristocrat from the Nawab family of Bengal and mother of Siraj ud-Daulah, the last independent Nawab of Bengal.

== Early life and background ==
Amina Begum was the youngest daughter of Nawab Alivardi Khan, the Nawab of Bengal, and Princess Sharfunnisa, the paternal aunt of Mir Jafar. Her paternal grandfather was Mirza Muhammad Madani, who was of either Arab or Turkic descent, the son of a foster brother of the Mughal emperor Aurangzeb. Her paternal grandmother belonged to the Turkic Afshar tribe of Khorasan. Through her, she was a relative of Shuja-ud-Din Muhammad Khan, the two having shared a common ancestor in Nawab Aqil Khan.

She married Zain ud-Din Ahmed Khan, who was appointed as the Naib Nazim (governor) of Patna by her father, Nawab Alivardi Khan. They had two sons, Ikram ud-Daulah and Siraj ud-Daulah.

== Later life ==
In contrast to her elder sister Ghaseti Begum, Amina Begum was not very much involved in politics. In 1748, Amina was captured along with her two sons by the Afghan rebels of Mustafa Khan after they had killed her husband, Zain ud-Din Ahmed Khan, in an attempt to take control of Bihar. They were rescued by her father, Nawab Alivardi Khan, in 1751, who also drove out the Afghan rebels.

After the death of her father in 1756, her son Siraj succeeded to the throne as the next Nawab of Bengal. Siraj was defeated by the British East India Company in the Battle of Plassey in 1757 partly due to the treachery of Amina's maternal cousin Mir Jafar. Amina Begum was subsequently imprisoned along with her other family members, including her mother, sister, and daughter-in-law. They were exiled from Murshidabad on a boat travelling to Jahangirnagar (Dhaka) in 1758, and were kept confined in the Jinjira Palace.

== Death ==
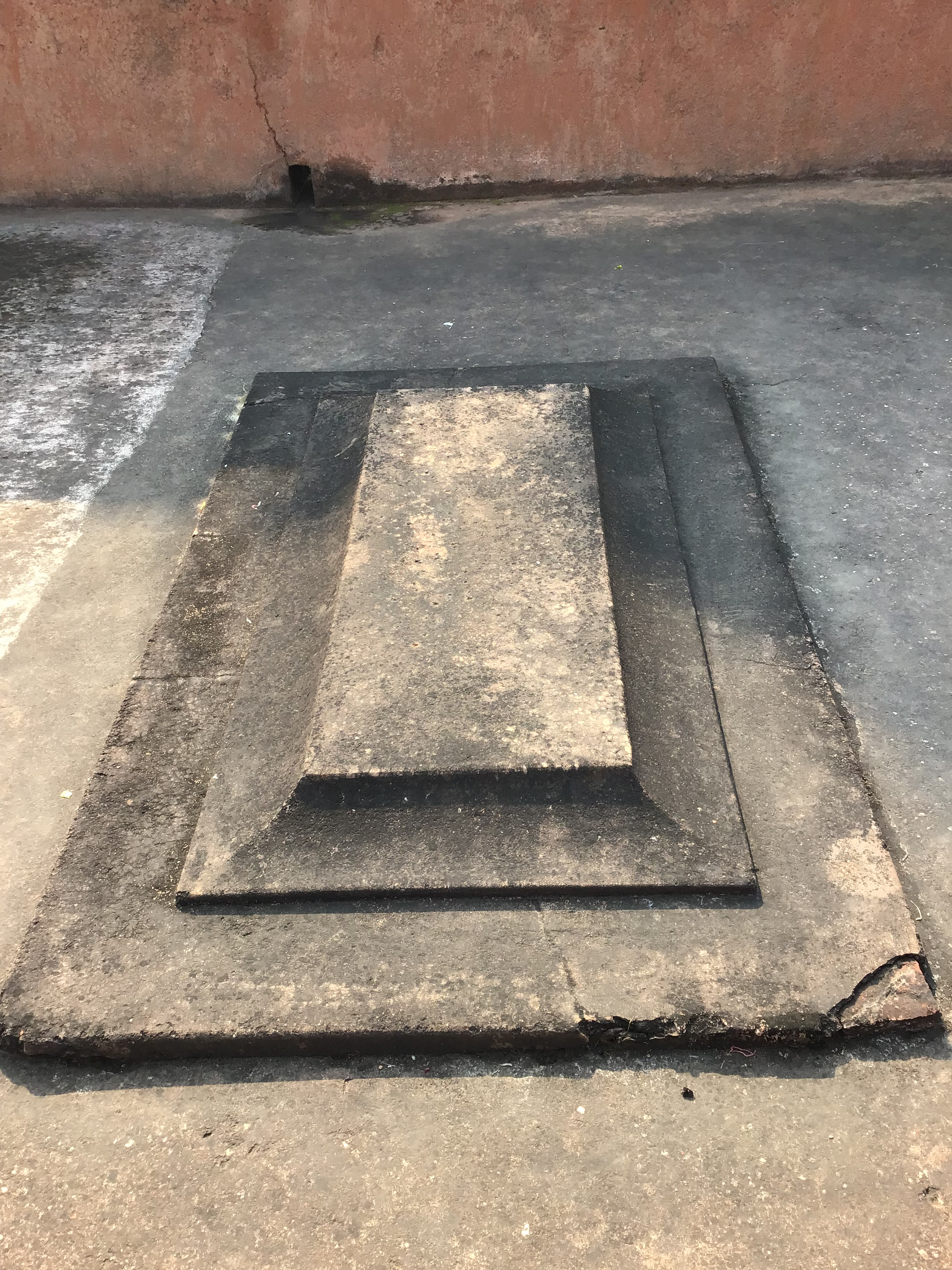
Amina Begum's tomb at Khushbagh

Mir Miran, the son of Mir Jafar, later ordered for some of them to be released and recalled to Murshidabad in 1760. On their way from Dhaka by boat, Amina Begum died when her boat was sunk on the orders of Miran. She was buried beside her family in Khushbagh, Murshidabad.
